= History of Christian universalism =

Doctrine that all sinful and alienated human souls will ultimately be reconciled to God

Christian universalism is the position in Christian theology that all human beings will ultimately be saved and restored to a right relationship with God. Universalists espouse various theological beliefs concerning the process or state of salvation, but all adhere to the view that salvation history concludes with the reconciliation of the entire human race to God. It has been argued that the Bible has a variety of verses that seem to support a plurality of eschatological views, though most mainstream Christian denominations do not explicitly teach it.

It is known that some figures in early Christianity such Gregory of Nyssa taught universal salvation, although its popular adherence by clergy and laypeople is controversial among historians and theologians. Throughout the middle ages and early modern period it was a minority position relative to belief in eternal damnation, but universalism has seen a resurgence in the 21st century due to the influence of theologians such as David Bentley Hart, Robin Parry and others.

It is not to be confused with Unitarian Universalism, which emerged in part from the Universalist Church but, being a non-credal faith, holds no official doctrinal positions. Universal reconciliation, however, remains a popular viewpoint among many of its congregations and individual believers, including many who have not associated with the Universalist Church.

== Biblical background ==
As David Fisher, a bishop and professor of philosophy has put it, "In the final analysis, the question of salvation is always an inquiry into the balancing of human free will with God's mercy and forgiveness." The Bible itself has, as referred to before, a variety of verses on the subject that appear to be contradictory if not given additional reader interpretation. Influential theologians Emil Brunner and J.A.T. Robinson argue that these verses can be put into two distinct categories: damnation for some or eventual reconciliation for all.

According to biblical scholar David Sim, The Apostle Paul does not seem to believe in an eternal hell but rather annihilationism, while Matthew does.

On the other hand, Robin Parry makes a case that Paul believes in the Ultimate Reconciliation of all people. It is Parry's contention that the overarching story of the Biblical narrative makes a strong case in support of what he calls "Evangelical Universalism."

As well, the Epistle to the Colossians receives attention, with Colossians 1:17–20 reading:

"He is before all things, and in Him all things hold together. And He is the head of the body, the church; He is the beginning and the firstborn from among the dead, so that in everything He might have the supremacy. For God was pleased to have all His fullness dwell in Him, and through Him to reconcile to Himself all things, whether things on earth or things in heaven, by making peace through His blood, shed on the cross."

Other Bible verses commonly quoted in support of Christian Universalism include:

Romans 5:18:

"Consequently, just as one trespass resulted in condemnation for all people, so also one righteous act resulted in justification and life for all people."

Lamentations 3:31-33:

"For no one is cast off by the Lord forever.

Though he brings grief, he will show compassion, so great is his unfailing love.

For he does not willingly bring affliction or grief to anyone."

1 Timothy 4:10:

"That is why we labor and strive, because we have put our hope in the living God, who is the Savior of all people, and especially of those who believe."

1 Corinthians 15:28

"When he has done this, then the Son himself will be made subject to him who put everything under him, so that God may be all in all."

== Development of universalist arguments ==
Broadly speaking, most historical advocates of Christian universalism throughout the years (and many now still) did so from the perspective of accepting the traditional Biblical canon as divinely inspired and without transcription error but rejecting strict Biblical literalism, practicing detailed exegesis of the texts. The advocates have argued that the apparent contradiction between Bible verses that describe God eventually reconciling humanity to goodness (such as in the Epistle to the Ephesians) with those that describe damnation to most of humanity (such as in the Book of Revelation) is that threats of long-term punishment function just as threats, not necessarily as predictions of future events, that will not be actually carried out. Advocates have also argued that suffering of sinners in hell or hell-like states will be long but still limited, not eternal (Apocatastasis).

However, liberal and progressive Christians have often argued that the teachings of the historical Jesus did not mention exclusive salvation for a select few and have altogether rejected many sections of the Bible written by figures decades after the life of Jesus as man-made inventions that are to be taken with a grain of salt.

While not being a universalist per se, influential Christian philosopher Karl Barth, often regarded as the greatest Protestant theologian of the twentieth century, spoke for a great deal of broadly traditional Christians when he wrote that salvation is centrally Christological. He asserted that in Jesus Christ, the reconciliation of all of mankind to God has essentially already taken place and that through Christ man is already elect and justified. Therefore, eternal salvation for everyone, even those that reject God, is a possibility that is more than an open question but should be hoped for by Christians as a matter of grace.

=== Responses ===
One recurrent objection to universalism made by many has been that having a deep-rooted belief in eternal torment as a possibility is a necessary deterrent from living an immoral life.

Universalists have often responded that punishments for sin can function well without being eternal, especially in the afterlife when one can face severe treatment first before one eventually gets to heaven.

== History ==
=== Early Christianity ===
According to Edward Beecher and George T. Knight, in the first 600 years of Christian history there were six main theological schools: four of them were universalist, one taught annihilationism and the last taught endless torment. Marcion, a second-century heretic, formulated universalistic theories about God. But many early Church Fathers have been quoted as either embracing or hoping for the ultimate reconciliation of all creatures with God as well. The concept of a final restoration of all souls had large appeal particularly in the East during the fourth and fifth centuries. Even in the West at that time, according to St. Augustine of Hippo, "very many" refused to believe in the eternal punishment and softened the harder statements of Holy Scripture by interpreting them as non-literal threats and invoking passages speaking of mercy, and St. Jerome wrote that "many" believed that even the devil "will repent and be restored to his former place."

==== Alexandria ====
The most important school of Universalist thought was the Didascalium in Alexandria, Egypt, which was founded by Saint Pantaenus in about 190. Alexandria was the centre of learning and intellectual discourse in the ancient Mediterranean world, and it was the theological centre of gravity of Christianity prior to the rise of the Roman Church.

==== Clement of Alexandria (c. 150 – c. 215) ====
The Universalists Hosea Ballou (1829), Thomas Whittemore (1830), John Wesley Hanson (1899) and George T. Knight (1911) claimed that Clement of Alexandria expressed universalist positions in early Christianity. Such claims have always been controversial. Some scholars believe that Clement used the term apokatastasis to refer primarily to the restoration of a select few, but with universal implications. Brian E. Daley writes that Clement viewed "punishment after death as a medicinal and therefore temporary measure" and that he suggested "with great caution the related prospect of universal salvation for all intelligent creatures", for example in his Stromateis, Book VII, Chapter 2.

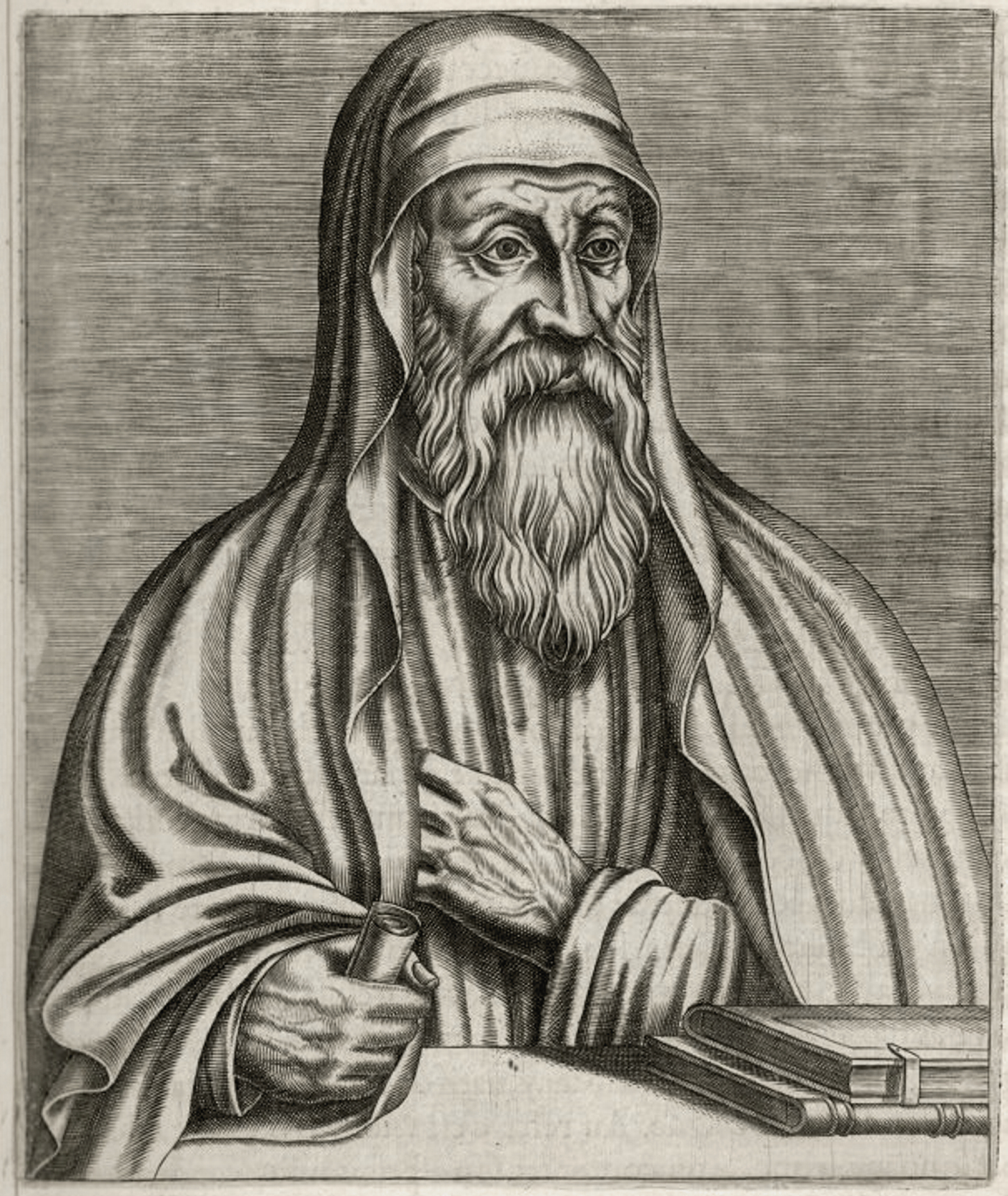
Origen, traditionally considered a 3rd-century proponent of Universal Reconciliation

==== Origen (c. 185 – 254) ====
According to Daley, Origen was firmly convinced that "all human souls will ultimately be saved" and "united to God forever in loving contemplation" and that this is "an indispensable part of the 'end' promised by Paul in I Cor 15.24–28." Daley also notes that Origen sometimes called this final state of universal salvation ἀποκατάστασις and suggested it was already a familiar concept to his readers.

Frederick W. Norris maintained, however, that Origen may not have strongly believed in universal reconciliation at all. In an article on apokatastasis in The Westminster Handbook to Origen (2004) he wrote, "As far as we can tell, therefore, Origen never decided to stress exclusive salvation or universal salvation, to the strict exclusion of either case." However, Origen explicitly stated that universal salvation should not be taught to the masses even if it is true, because only the very wise can abstain from sin without the threat of eternal consequences, so his ambiguity may have been deliberate and does not necessarily entail a lack of conviction that a universal restoration will take place.

==== Gregory of Nyssa (c. 335 – 390s) ====
Gregory of Nyssa, who was declared "the father of fathers" by the Seventh Ecumenical Council, is interpreted by many scholars as a proponent of universal salvation

Gregory stated, "when death approaches to life, and darkness to light, and the corruptible to the incorruptible, the inferior is done away with and reduced to non-existence, and the thing purged is benefited, just as the dross is purged from gold by fire. In the same way in the long circuits of time, when the evil of nature which is now mingled and implanted in them has been taken away, whensoever the restoration to their old condition of the things that now lie in wickedness takes place, there will be a unanimous thanksgiving from the whole creation, both of those who have been punished in the purification and of those who have not at all needed purification."

=== 6th century – Ecumenical condemnation of universalism? ===
Apokatastasis was interpreted by 19th-century Universalists such as Hosea Ballou (1842) to be the same as the beliefs of the Universalist Church of America. However, until the middle of the 6th century, the word had a broader meaning. While it applied to a number of doctrines regarding salvation, it also referred to a return to both a location and an original condition. Thus, the Greek word's application was originally broad and metaphorical. Many heteroclite views became associated with Origen, and the 15 anathemas against him attributed to the Second Council of Constantinople condemned a form of apokatastasis, along with the pre-existence of the soul, animism, a heterodox Christology, and a denial of real and lasting resurrection of the body. Some authorities believe that the anathemas belong to an earlier local synod.

The New Advent Catholic Encyclopedia claims that the Fifth Ecumenical Council was contested as being an official and authorized Ecumenical Council since it was established not by the Pope but the Emperor since the Pope resisted it. The Fifth Ecumenical Council addressed what was called "The Three Chapters" and was against a form of Origenism that had nothing to do with Origen and Origenist views. Popes Vigilius, Pelagius I (556–61), Pelagius II (579–90), and Gregory the Great (590–604) were aware only that the Fifth Council specifically dealt with the Three Chapters, and they neither mentioned Origenism or Universalism and nor spoke as if they knew of its condemnation even though Gregory the Great was opposed to the belief of universalism. Scholar Richard Bauckham stated that while universalism appeared "discredited" because of scholarly resistance to Origen's view, it "seems in doubt" if the Fifth Ecumenical Council specifically endorsed any negative view of it.

=== 7th century – Isaac of Nineveh ===
The universal reconciliation was strongly advocated in the writings of St. Isaac the Syrian, a monastic theologian and bishop of Nineveh.

=== Middle Ages ===
The Universalist John Wesley Hanson stated that even after eternal hell became the normative position of the Church, there were still some Christian thinkers during the Middle Ages who embraced Universalist ideas. In his Schaff article George T. Knight stated that "maybe" Johannes Scotus Eriugena, Johannes Tauler, Blessed John of Ruysbroeck and Blessed Julian of Norwich had Universalist leanings.

Solomon of Akhlat, a thirteenth-century bishop of the Church of the East, defended universalism in his Book of the Bee, mostly basing himself on citations of Isaac of Nineveh, Theodore of Mopsuestia, and Diodorus of Tarsus. David Bentley Hart confirms this and adds that Timotheus II, a fourteenth-century patriarch of the said church, "thought it uncontroversial to assert that the aiōnios pains of hell will come to an end when the souls cleansed by them, through the prayers of the saints, enter paradise."

=== 16th century – Reformation era ===
The period between the Reformation and the Age of Enlightenment featured extended debates about salvation and hell, but although figures such as Erasmus rekindled interests in the Greek Church Fathers, and early advocates of universal salvation, such as Origen, became more broadly known as new editions of their writings were published, the universal restoration was not a doctrine that mainstream Reformers wished to restore. Nonetheless, even as the Augsburg Confession promulgates endless torment, it condemns "Anabaptists, who think that there will be an end to the punishments of condemned men and devils."

Joachim Vadian and Johann Kessler accused the German Anabaptist Hans Denck of teaching universal salvation, and modern universalists have embraced him, but some research suggests that he in fact did not teach it though he hoped for it. However, that research overlooks Denck's profession of universalism in Sigelsbach's sympathetic account of his conversation with him. Furthermore, despite initially denying his universalism before Urbanus Rhegius, teary-eyed Denck then allegedly confessed his belief "that no man or devil was eternally damned", and appealed to biblical sayings about God's mercy (though he did believe in a painful hell). Moreover, after Denck's death, universalism was reportedly professed by an Anabaptist imprisoned for heresy in 1528, and Denck's student Clement Ziegler published two treatises defending it in 1532, but would keep quiet about it the last 20 years of his life. Other Anabaptists like Balthasar Hubmaier or Melchior Hoffman did not teach universalism but a doctrine similar to Arminianism.

=== 17th century ===
The 17th century saw a resurgence of Christian universalism:

- Gerrard Winstanley, The Mysterie of God Concerning the Whole Creation, Mankinde (London, 1648).
- Richard Coppin, A hint of the glorious mysterie of the divine teachings (1649), defended at Worcester Assizes, 1652.
- Jane Leade, A Revelation of the Everlasting Gospel Message (1697).
- Jeremiah White, chaplain to Oliver Cromwell, wrote a book, The Restoration of all things, which was published posthumously in 1712 after his death in 1707.

Prominent universalists of this time also include the Cambridge Platonists in 17th-century England such as Peter Sterry.

The rise of ideological Calvinism, which taught that God neither sought out nor wanted salvation for all mankind and strictly held that divine omnipotence meant that God created those that he foresaw damnation for without mercy, fueled an intellectual counterreaction in which universalist-like doctrines that God intended all of humanity to be saved and will extend grace to most of humanity gained appeal. Arminianism and Quaker doctrine received much attention, but Christian universalism was still a fringe phenomenon in terms of scholarly thinking at the time.

=== 18th century in Great Britain ===
Biblical scholar Richard Bauckham offered an academic survey of the history of the re-arising of the belief in Universal Salvation:

The history of the doctrine of universal salvation (or apokatastasis) is a remarkable one. Until the nineteenth century almost all Christian theologians taught the reality of eternal torment in hell. Here and there, outside the theological mainstream, were some who believed that the wicked would be finally annihilated (in its commonest form, this is the doctrine of 'conditional immortality'). Even fewer were the advocates of universal salvation, though these few included some major theologians of the early church. Eternal punishment was firmly asserted in official creeds and confessions of the churches. It must have seemed as indispensable a part of universal Christian belief as the doctrines of the Trinity and the incarnation. Since 1800 this situation has entirely changed, and no traditional Christian doctrine has been so widely abandoned as that of eternal punishment. Its advocates among theologians today must be fewer than ever before. The alternative interpretation of hell as annihilation seems to have prevailed even among many of the more conservative theologians. Among the less conservative, universal salvation, either as hope or as dogma, is now so widely accepted that many theologians assume it virtually without argument.

George Whitfield, in a letter to John Wesley, wrote that Peter Bohler, a bishop in the Moravian Church, had privately confessed in a letter that "all the damned souls would hereafter be brought out of hell". William Law in An Humble, Earnest, and Affectionate Address to the Clergy (1761), an Anglican, and James Relly, a Welsh Methodist, were other significant 18th-century Protestant leaders who believed in Universalism.

In 1843, the Universalist Rev J. M. Day published an article "Was John Wesley a Restorationist?" in the Universalist Union magazine, suggesting that John Wesley (d. 1791) had made a private conversion to Universalism in his last years but had kept it secret. Biographers of Wesley reject that claim.

=== 18th century in North America ===
The 18th century saw the establishment of the Universalist Church in America, in part by the efforts of Hosea Ballou.

Universalism was brought to the North American colonies in the early 18th century by the English-born physician George de Benneville, who was attracted by Pennsylvania's Quaker tolerance. North American universalism was active and organized. That was seen as a threat by the orthodox, Calvinist Congregationalists of New England such as Jonathan Edwards, who wrote prolifically against universalist teachings and preachers. John Murray (1741–1815) and Elhanan Winchester (1751–1797) are usually credited as founders of the modern Universalist movement and founding teachers of universal salvation. Early American Universalists such as Elhanan Winchester continued to preach the punishment of souls prior to eventual salvation.

The early 18th century in North America was also marked by the Restorationist Controversy. These decades were marked by debates between two camps of Christian universalism belief, ultra-univeralism, the belief that no punishment exists in the afterlife, and universal restorationism, the belief that punishment exists in the afterlife. Out of this came the founding of the Massachusetts Association of Universal Restorationists in 1831, running until 1841. Afterwards in 1843 co-founder Adin Ballou and other Christian universal restorationist preachers from the group went on to form Hopedale Community as a blending of Christian socialism and Christian universalism.

=== 19th century ===
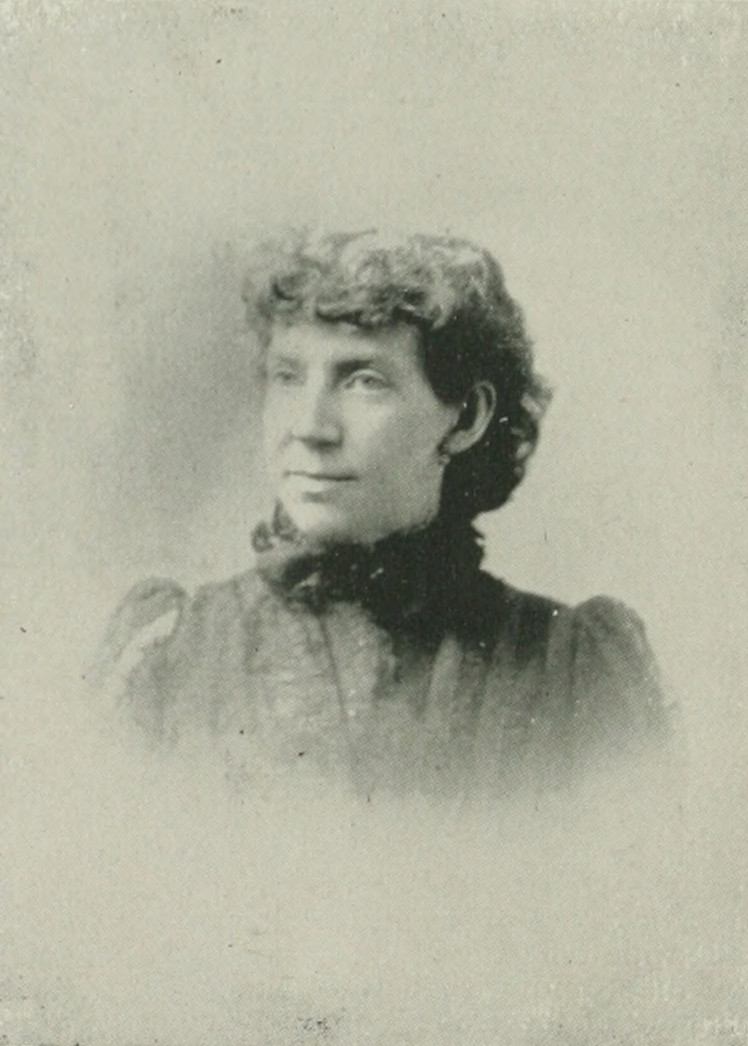
In 1890, Ella May Bennett, a Universalist minister, was the first woman to be ordained to the ministry on Long Island.

The 19th century was the heyday of Christian universalism and the Universalist Church of America.

The famous German philosopher Friedrich Schleiermacher became one of the most well-known religious thinkers to teach universalism. Though he somewhat shared John Calvin's view of predestination, he interpreted the concept of an all-determining will of God to mean that through God's might, power, and foresight, humanity as a whole is fundamentally united in God's view and that every single person will eventually be drawn into His irresistible influence.

Other examples include English theologian Henry Bristow Wilson, who took somewhat of a universalist viewpoint in his part of the famous 1860 work Essays and Reviews and became condemned in the Court of Arches (an ecclesiastical court of the Church of England), only to soon receive vindication when the Lord Chancellor overturned that condemnation. Frederic Farrar's famous series of sermons in Westminster Abbey in 1877, published in print as Eternal Hope a year later, disputed the traditional views of damnation and punishment.

=== 20th century ===
While highly influential Protestant theologians Karl Barth and Emil Brunner did not strictly identify as universalists, both wrote in detail about how they viewed complete salvation extended to every single member of mankind as being not just a distinct possibility but as something that should be hoped for by all Christians.

The Universalist Church of America merged with the American Unitarian Association in 1961 to form the Unitarian Universalists.

Hans Urs von Balthasar wrote a small book addressing the virtuous hope for universalism, as well as its origin in Origen, Dare We Hope "That All Men Be Saved"?. He also addressed the relationship between love and universalism in Love Alone is Credible.

Adolph E. Knoch and William Barclay were universalists. In 1919, the Swiss F. L. Alexandre Freytag led a breakaway group of the Bible Student movement.

Children's author Madeleine L'Engle (A Wrinkle in Time) was an advocate of universalism, which led several Christian retail outlets to refuse to stock her books.

In the late 1990s, theologian Max King introduced a doctrine called "Transmillennialism", which was an extension of the preterist system of eschatology, that held the two covenants overlapped during the times of the New Testament, and the final end of the old age, and judgment portrayed in Revelation and elsewhere, was fulfilled by the destruction of Jerusalem and the Temple in AD70. With God's wrath "completed" in that, a "comprehensive grace" then spread unconditionally to all.

=== 21st century ===
Christian Universalism continues as an influence within not only Unitarian Universalism but also Trinitarian Universalism.

In 2004, the Pentecostal bishop Carlton Pearson received notoriety when he was officially declared a heretic by the Joint College of African-American Pentecostal Bishops. Bishop Pearson, who had attended Oral Roberts University, a Charismatic Christian college, formally declared his belief in the doctrine of universal salvation. His church, called the New Dimensions Church, adopted that doctrine (that is, those who remained, since a significant majority of the church's original membership left), and in 2008, the congregation was merged into All Souls Unitarian Church in Tulsa, Oklahoma, one of the largest Unitarian Universalist congregations in the world.

The Evangelical Universalist: The Biblical Hope That God's Love Will Save us All, by "Gregory MacDonald", was published in 2006. "Gregory MacDonald" is a pen name, and the book's author was later revealed to be Robin Parry. The same author is also a coeditor of a 2003 compilation, Universal Salvation? The Current Debate, and of a 2010 book, All Shall Be Well, which reviews the doctrine of universal salvation from Origen to Moltmann.

On May 17, 2007, the Christian Universalist Association was founded at the historic Universalist National Memorial Church in Washington, DC. That was a move to distinguish the modern Christian Universalist movement from Unitarian Universalism and to promote ecumenical unity among Christian believers in universal reconciliation.

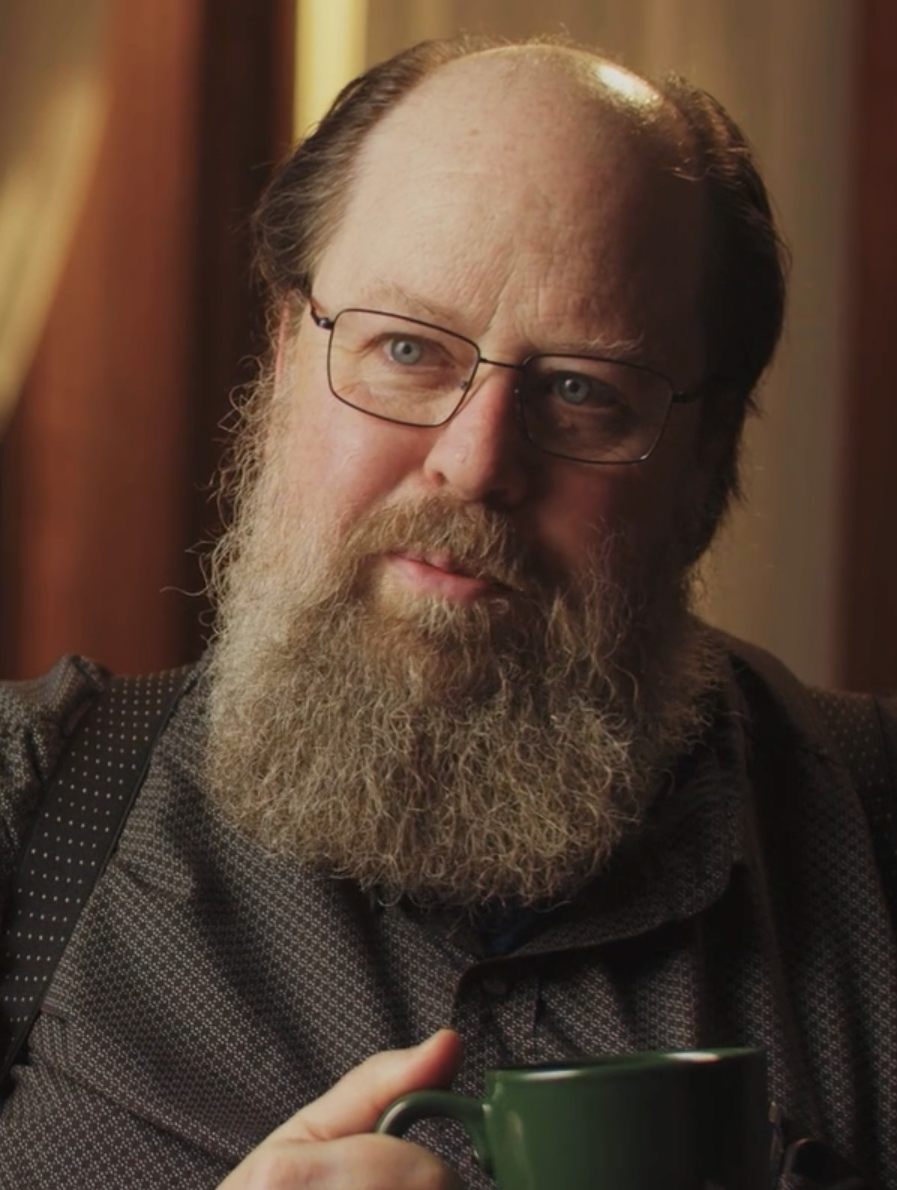
American religious studies scholar and theologian David Bentley Hart

In 2008, the Russian Orthodox scholar-bishop Hilarion Alfeyev of Volokolamsk, in his presentation at the First World Apostolic Congress of Divine Mercy (held in Rome in 2008), argued that God's mercy is so great that He does not condemn sinners to everlasting punishment. He said that the Orthodox understanding of Hell corresponds roughly to the Roman Catholic notion of purgatory. American Eastern Orthodox theologian David Bentley Hart has also argued for the coherence of the universalist position, most notably in That All Shall Be Saved: Heaven, Hell, and Universal Salvation (2019).

In her massive 2013 monograph The Christian Doctrine of Apokatastasis, A Critical Assessment from the New Testament to Eriugena, Ilaria L.E. Ramelli argues that apokatastasis (restoration) is a major patristic doctrine stemming from Greek philosophy and Jewish-Christian Scriptures. She makes the case for its presence and Christological and Biblical foundation in many Fathers, analysing its meaning and development from the birth of Christianity to Eriugena.

Contemporary Conservative Evangelical teachers of ultimate reconciliation include Thomas Talbott and J.D. Leavitt, founder of Heavenly Faith.

Two Christian theologians of the 20th and 21st centuries who wrote in support of universalism and have received major notice are J.A.T. Robinson and John Hick. Both argued for universalism as coming from God's nature as being of omnipotent love and stated that as time went on after death, some would temporarily refuse to repent, but none would refuse to repent forever. Hick, in particular, stated that the seemingly contradictory nature of the Bible's references to damnation came about because the warnings of hell are conditional to warn men about eternal suffering if they permanently refuse to repent, but nobody would actually make that choice.

A proponent of the idea of universal salvation is also the Polish Cardinal Grzegorz Ryś, who in an interview on September 26, 2024, claimed that "[...] all people, regardless of which religion they profess, OR WHETHER THEY PROFESS NONE AT ALL, are saved through the death, resurrection, and ascension of the Lord Jesus".

== See also ==
- Christian mysticism
- Love of Christ
- Love of God
- Panentheism
- Philosophical theology
- Restorative justice
- Limited atonement
- Unlimited atonement
- Apocatastasis
