= Hopedale =

Hopedale is the name of several places:

In Canada:

- Hopedale, Newfoundland and Labrador

In the United Kingdom:

- Hopedale, a hamlet within the parish of Alstonefield, Staffordshire

In the United States:

- Hopedale, Illinois
- Hopedale, Massachusetts, a New England town
  - Hopedale (CDP), Massachusetts, the town center
  - The Hopedale Community, historic community
- Hopedale, Ohio
