= Massachusetts Association of Universal Restorationists =

Christian denomination

- Abbreviation: MAUR
- Type: Christian religious denomination
- Classification: Christianity
- Orientation: Christian universalist
- Scripture: Holy Bible
- Theology: Universalist
- Associations: Providence Association
- Language: English
- Headquarters: Mendon, Massachusetts
- Founder: Co-founded by Adin Ballou, Paul Dean and six other universal restorationist clergymen.
- Origin: 1831
- Branched from: Universalist Church of America (known as the New England Universalist Convention and the Universalist General Convention at the time).
- Defunct: 1841
- Ministers: 31

The Massachusetts Association of Universal Restorationists (MAUR) was a Christian universalist denomination founded in 1831 by eight Christian universal restorationist clergymen that ran until 1841. It was opposed to Christian ultra-universalism and was made in response to the Restorationist Controversy.

The group met annually, and eventually disbanded in 1841 due to disagreements on whether to focus purely on theological issues, as co-founder Paul Dean wanted, or to include social issues, as co-founder Adin Ballou wanted. At most, 31 ministers were recruited.

== History ==
=== The Restorationist Controversy ===
Since the late 17th century, there existed two camps of Christian universalist thought. Ultra-universalism held that no punishment existed after death. Meanwhile, universal restorationism posited the existence of punishment in the afterlife.

==== Winchester Profession ====
Around 1792, Edward Turner converted to Christian universalism while studying at Leicester Academy with his close friend Hosea Ballou. The two moved to southern Worcester County, Massachusetts for evangelism until Hosea Ballou moved to Barnard, Vermont in 1803. It was at this time that the New England Universalist General Convention adopted the Winchester Profession in Winchester, New Hampshire, which Hosea Ballou sponsored as a member of the committee. The creed professed belief in the Old and New Testament as holy and revealing God's loving character through the Trinity to restore all humanity to holiness and happiness. Turner heavily disagreed with this decision, citing concerns of unnecessary divisions among Christians. This sparked the first of many disagreements among the two friends.

==== The Gospel Visitant ====
In 1811, Turner and Hosea Ballou founded the Gloucester Conference, where ministers would publish articles in The Gospel Visitant which ran for around a year. Hosea Ballou had previously believed in scripture teaching ultra-universalism. However, 1 Peter 3:18–20, which showed Christ in hell preaching to the spirits in prison had forced him to conclude that scripture taught the existence of afterlife punishment.

In 1815, Jacob Wood gained fellowship at the Universalist General Convention and became ordained in their following session. Then, in 1817, Wood, who desired to have universal restorationism as a core tenant of Christian universalism, persuaded Turner and Hosea Ballou into a series of debates published on the Gospel Visitant journal. It was here that Hosea Ballou returned to ultra-universalism. He walked back from his former view of 1 Peter 3:18–20, interpreting the imprisoned souls as living Gentiles that the crucified Christ preached to, much to Turner's dismay.

==== The Universalist Magazine ====
Hosea Ballou then founded the Universalist Magazine in 1819. As its editor, it quickly became one of the most influential journals on American Universalism at the time. Hosea Ballou avoided mentioning the Restorationist Controversy in it until around 1821 when a new editor replaced him who printed letters exchanged by Hosea Ballou, Dean, Turner and Wood. It was July 26 of this year when his great-nephew Hosea Ballou II, a Christian universalist restorationist, became pastor of the New Universalist Church of Roxbury, Mass.

Hosea Ballou again took on the role of editor with Hosea Ballou II and Thomas Whittemore as his assistants. Many universal restorationists believed that under this new management, they had been denied a platform to voice their belief, as Wood had reached out to Hosea Ballou requesting an oral debate, but was denied.

Despite Hosea Ballou citing the reason for his decision to keep the Restorationist Controversy again out of the magazine as being tolerant and neutral, for several years many universal restorationists believed that he continued to make derogatory remarks on the pulpit and in the publication towards universal restorationism.

==== Appeal and Declaration ====
In late 1822, six universal restorationists voluntarily abstained from attending the New England General Convention, instead holding their own convention. Among them was Wood, who in December of that year prepared two articles known as Appeal and Declaration in the Vermont universalist paper Christian Repository. In it he declared universal restorationism and ultra-universalism as being "incapable of being reconciled together" and that "we consider the [no future punishment] doctrine to be subversive of a just sense of our accountability to God, and the proper distinction between virtue and vice."

Hosea Ballou and other ultra universalists were deeply offended by this denial of fellowship in Christian universalist ministry. Hosea Ballou II, despite believing in universal restorationism himself, published an editorial against Wood's articles in the Universalist Magazine, accusing Turner and Dean of creating this controversy out of jealousy towards his great-uncle Hosea Ballou's eminence. Despite most Christian universalists at the time being universal restorationists as well, many of them believed this accusation.

In 1823 charges issued from the Universalist General Convention against Dean and Hosea Ballou were cleared. Dean however, grew unsatisfied by this and resigned from fellowship. The Southern Association compelled the five other sponsors of Appeal and Declaration to sign a disclaimer, which did not retract but reinterpreted their universal restorationist manifesto to allow fellowship with the ultra-universalists.

By the middle of 1824, Dean returned into fellowship with the New England General Convention and all six formally settled their differences. However, as a result of the Restorationist Controversy, Turner was removed from his pulpit in Charlestown, Massachusetts and the ultra-universalists, such as Hosea Ballou and Whittemore, soon returned to what universal restorationists saw as harsh treatment towards their belief. Turner, feeling no longer safe being in the same denomination as Hosea Ballou, eventually left the Christian trinitarian universalists in 1828 to join the unitarian universalists.

==== A Series of Letters ====
In 1827, Christian universal restorationist Charles Hudson addressed A Series of Letters to Hosea Ballou, which he refused to read. Dean proposed a constitutional reform for the Universalist General Convention which Whittemore and Hosea Ballou voted against.

In 1828, Christian ultra-universalist Walter Balfour replied to A Series of Letters through Three Essays, which Hosea Ballou approved of. The Universalist General Convention decided to implement new disciplinary rules, but only friends of Hosea Ballou were allowed on the disciplinary committee.

From 1827 to 1829, universal restorationist sympathizer David Pickering, with Dean's assistance, formed Providence Association, with the majority of membership belonging to universal restorationists. In 1829, Pickering then left the Universalist General Convention and all associations under its jurisdiction. Then, in 1830 the Southern Association, backed by the Universalist General Convention, banned all its members from sharing membership with both itself and the Providence Association.

One member of the Providence Association was Hosea Ballou's distant cousin, Adin Ballou, who had preached universal restorationism to a supportive congregation in Medway, Massachusetts. However, Whittemore harshly criticized this sermon in the ultra-universalist Trumpet and Universalist Magazine. In response, Adin Ballou, founded the Independent Messenger newspaper in 1831 for the Massachusetts Association of Universal Restorationists, which Dean served as an editor on from 1835 to 1838. Adin Ballou and Whittemore fought through their respective publications across four years.

=== The Founding of the Massachusetts Association of Universal Restorationists ===
In 1831 at a Providence Association meeting, the Massachusetts Association of Universal Restorationists was founded. Over time, many universal restorationist clergy would transition to serving at Unitarian churches. Some even joined Bernard Whitman's Unitarian party in Waltham, Massachusetts, thought it withered after Whitman's death in 1834.

However, there was a divide within the Massachusetts Association of Universal Restorations between those who wanted to build a new Christian denomination and those who wanted to build a new Christian government. This became evident at the 1837 annual meeting where Adin Ballou submitted a series of moral reforms to vote that many saw as far too politically radical. By 1839, Adin Ballou adopted a new commitment to nonresistance which only deepened the divide.

By this year, Adin Ballou and his disciples had begun moving towards forming the Hopedale Community, which blended Christian universalism and Christian socialism. Meanwhile, Turner served in various Unitarian congregations, like in Charlton, Massachusetts, until retiring in 1840. By 1841, the denomination had officially dissolved. Dean then moved from Boston to Framingham where he helped in the development of Freemasonry. Despite Dean's earlier trinitarianism, in 1845, he served in a Unitarian pulpit in North Easton, Massachusetts. Hudson would pursue a political career in Massachusetts.

In 1871, Ballou declared that the vast majority of Christian universalists were Christian universal restorationists. He believed that the Massachusetts Association of Universal Restorationists, though having been dissolved in just 10 years, had succeeded in its mission of promoting Christian universal restorationism as the majority Christian universalism belief. "Its mission was a moral necessity, and well fulfilled -- to the lasting good of all sects and parties affected by it."

== Beliefs ==
The manifesto of the Massachusetts Association of Universal Restorationists reads that "Modern sentiments of No-future accountability, connected with Materialism, are unfriendly to pure religion, and subversive of the best interest of Society." Additionally, they see themselves to be the true heirs of Christian universalists Murray, Winchester and Chauncy, much to the dismay of ultra-universalists like Whittemore. Adin Ballou claimed that Clement of Alexandria, Origen, Gregory of Nyssa, Nazianzen, Tillotson, Newton, Ramsay, Petitpierre were all true Christian universalist restorationists.

=== Christian Universal Restorationism ===
The Massachusetts Association of Universal Restorationists believed in universal salvation through Jesus Christ and in the existence of punishment after death, typically in Hell. They were against ultra-universalism, which held that all souls upon death would immediately be saved without any punishment at all.

=== Christian Immortalism ===
The Massachusetts Association of Universal Restorationists believed that the human soul is naturally immortal and can never cease to exist, even after death. This is seen in how their manifesto against Materialism was shaped by how many Christian universal restorationists around 1827 accused Balfour of materialism in his belief of dead souls to be extinct until they were to be raised to life in the universal resurrection. As a result, they were also against Christian conditionalism, a view practically synonymous with Christian annihilationism, that the unsaved would be permanently destroyed.

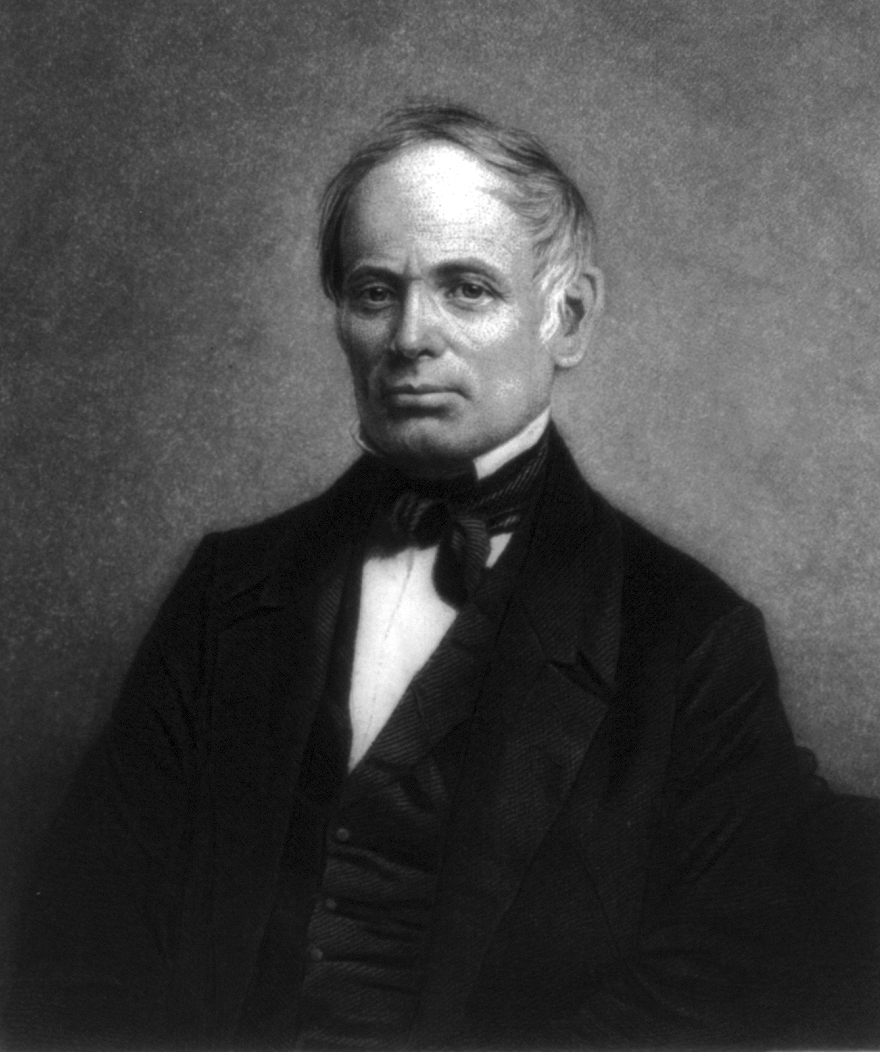
Adin Ballou, author of the Standard of Practical Christianity.

=== Standard of Practical Christianity ===
In Adin Ballou and William S Heywood's book 'History of the Hopedale Community', it states that the Massachusetts Association of Universal Restorationists were divided into a liberal minority, which Ballou was a part of, and a conservative majority. The book claims that both sides supported reforms for Abolition, Temperance, peace and eventually adopted Adin Ballou's 'Standard of Practical Christianity'. This Standard is described as the following:

==== New Testament ====
They are Christians who believe in the canonicity of the New Testament. That Christianity is a religion of love. Their only law is the will of God. They desire to restore all humanity, especially those most fallen and friendless. To be promoters of useful knowledge and morals. That there is no other Spiritual Father besides God and no master but Christ. That they are 'not of this world', but rather, to the world to come. They see patriotism as a love of their enemies, glory as self sacrifice and true wealth as charity. They hold doing good above merely eating, drinking, sleeping, dressing and any other earthly appetites. They desire to dedicate all they have to the cause of universal righteousness. They valued reproof, owning up to their mistakes and turning away from sin.

==== Separation of the Church and the State ====
They affirmed separation of the Church and the State, which they defined as a voluntary withdrawal from all interference, politics, administration and defense of the governments of this world. They would refuse to vote in any polls or hold any government offices. As well, they would not fight under, nor seek shelter under the government. All forms of civil commotions they would strive to avoid.

If they were treated unfairly, they would not seek justice through the legal court system, nor would they petition legislatures to enact laws. However, they were still free to express their own opinions of government acts. If there were laws they deemed unrighteous, they refused to obey them. However, if the laws were what they deemed 'innocent', they would obey them. They also refused participation in any conspiracy, insurrection, plot, rebellion, riot, sedition against any government. If taxes were levied against them, they would pay them, and even if they charged with penalties, they would still pay them.

All emolument, trade and unwilling contributions they refused for preaching the gospel, believing the truth ought to be free from being ruled over by money.

==== Nonresistance ====
They strove to never resort to physical violence, no matter if it was to compel people to do what was right or prevent them from doing what was wrong, even if they were to preserve their lives. They were against holding grudges, and sought to bless and pray for those who cursed and persecuted them, paraphrasing Matthew 5:44.

They were also against holding arbitrary authority through the use of honorary titles, flattery for human applause, pharisaical dogma, or self-righteous hypocrisy. They refused all forms of anathematization, execration and excommunication of any who were deemed an apostate or heretic. Only acts such as withdrawal of fellowship or declination of familiar intercourse were allowed against these people.

==== Animal Rights ====
They refused to act with cruelty to any beast of the earth.

==== Social Justice ====
They condemned abuse and indifference towards humanity. They sought to clothe the naked, minister the sick, visit those in prison and feed the hungry as is referenced in Matthew 25:36–40. By rescuing the ensnared, fallen, lost and wandering and reforming the benighted, scornful, vicious and wayward, they strove to uphold a universal charity. Among their goals was also bridging the gap between the rich and the poor.

==== Abolitionism ====
They held an utter abhorrence towards slavery, the ownership of people as property.

==== Temperance ====
They were against alcoholism, the excessive indulgence in alcohol.

==== Other ====
They were against covetousness, licentiousness and all forms of worldly ambitions. They were against the over-indulgence of drinking, eating, joy, labor, sleeping, sorrow, study. They refused to live lives of carelessness, extravagance, feverish anxiety, greed, rudeness and treachery. They were also against offering insincere flattery and fulsome compliments.

They could not follow anything they deemed as frivolous amusements and countenance games of chance. Additionally, they would not wear what they saw as costly apparel, useless ornaments and badges of ornament. They would not distinguish themselves by any particular formalities of language or garments.

They did not permit themselves to swear under any oath or vow, or to offer extraordinary protestations of their innocence and sincerity. They were against the uttering of blasphemy, falsehood, obscene expressions, foolish jests and profane exclamations.

They refused to enter into any state of matrimony without having had serious deliberation and what they saw as assurance of divine approbation as well.

They stood against corporeal punishment, over-fondness and scolding towards their children.

They did not allow the speaking of faults in the absence of their other brethren without having had first conferred and admonished them and confirmed that said brethren had not promised amendment.

Additionally, they sought not to over-urge anyone to join their group and refused resorting to what they saw as undignified means of proselytism.

If they found those they saw as unreasonable, they would refuse to debate with them. Or if there were a group of scornful people, they would refuse introducing sacred subjects to them.

=== Trinitarianism or Unitarianism ===
Adin Ballou, one of the group's co-founder and representative of the liberal side, would rally much of the liberal restorationists towards the founding of Hopedale Community, which would additionally support Women's rights and Spiritualism. Meanwhile, Dean, another co-founder, had hoped to keep the denomination's focus on theological issues.

There existed both trinitarian universalists and unitarian universalists within the group. Many Massachusetts Universal Restorationists would serve at Unitarian churches, some even being involved in Whitman's Unitarian party before it fell off around 1834.

=== More than two afterlife destinations ===
Not all members believed that the only afterlife destinations were heaven and hell. Paul Dean, for instance, posited a distinct 'intermediate state', a third destination where non-believers could go to hear the gospel to align their souls to grace.

== See also ==
- Christian universalism
- Trinitarian universalism
- History of Christian universalism
- Universalist Church of America
- Adin Ballou
- Hopedale Community
