= Christian Universalist Church of America =

Christian Universalist deomination

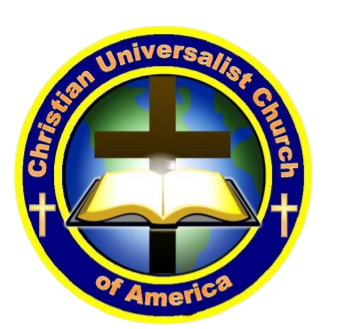
- Classification: Protestant
- Theology: Christian Universalism
- Governance: Congregationalist polity
- General Superintendent: The Rev. Ashley Beckham
- Headquarters: McKinney, TX
- Origin: 1964; Florida
- Official website: https://christianunivesalistchurch.org/

The Christian Universalist Church of America is a small non-creedal denominational body created in 1964 in Deerfield Beach, Florida as a result of the merger between the Universalist Church of America with the American Unitarian Association in 1961. The Christian Universalist Church of America teaches and promotes the doctrine of Universal Reconciliation. The church ceased to exist in 1967 at which time it claimed 200 churches and missions in 21 states with more than 15,000 members and was reestablished in 2001 in the state of Indiana first as the Universalist Church, then as the Universalist Congregations of North America and then back to its original and current name. The Church subscribes to the Winchester Profession of Faith.
