= Bancroft Memorial Library =

- U.S. National Register of Historic Places
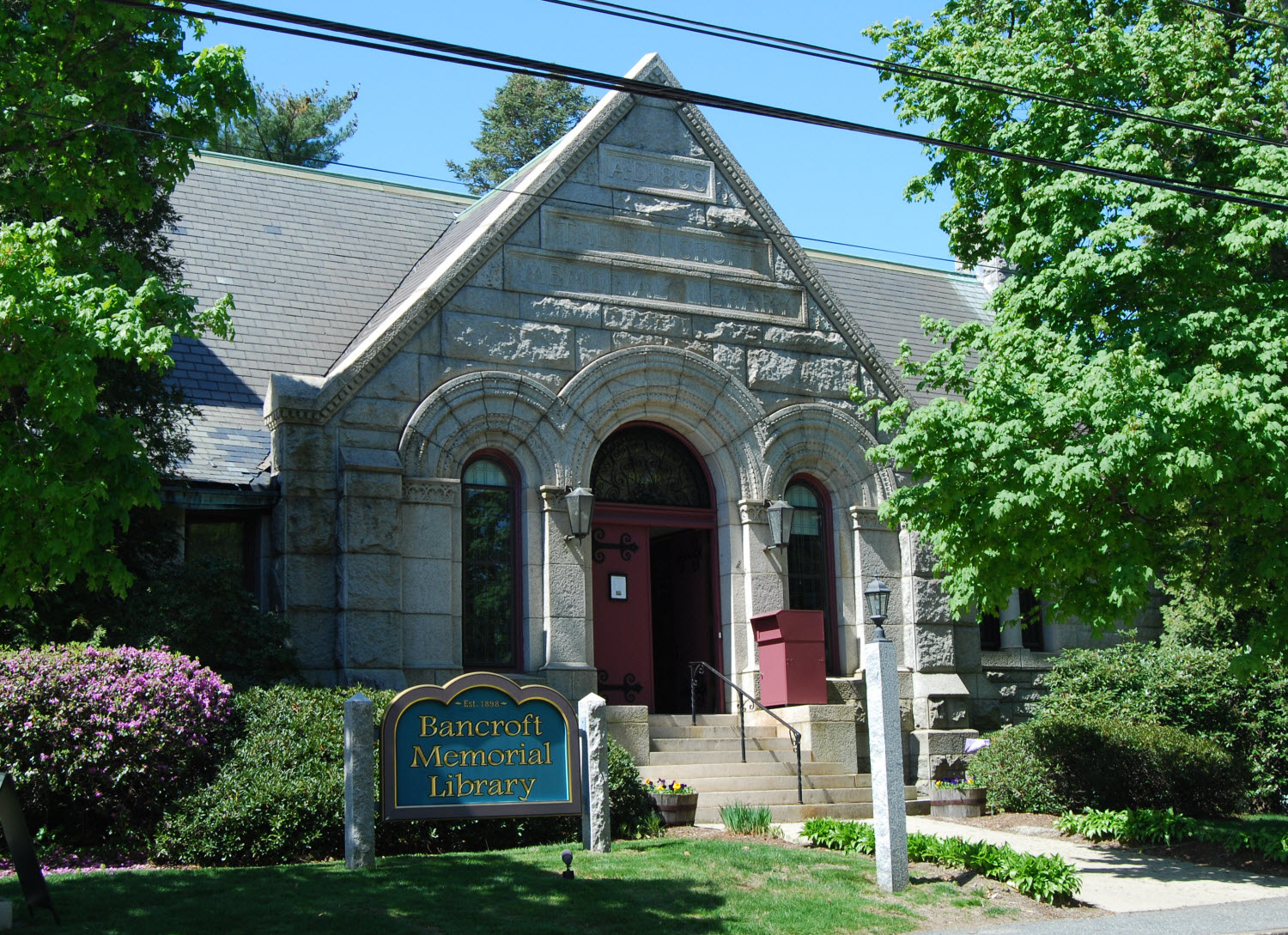

- Location within Massachusetts Location within the United States
- Location: 50 Hopedale St., Hopedale, Massachusetts
- Coordinates: 42°7′49″N 71°32′30″W
- Area: less than one acre
- Architect: C. Walker Howard
- Architectural style: Romanesque
- NRHP reference No.: 99000188
- Added to NRHP: February 12, 1999

Bancroft Memorial Library is the public library serving Hopedale, Massachusetts. It is located at 50 Hopedale Street in the town center, in a fine Romanesque building built in 1898-99 and listed on the National Register of Historic Places.

== Architecture and history ==
The library is located on the west side of Hopedale Street, a short way north of the town common. It is a single-story stone structure, designed by Boston architect C. Howard Walker of the firm Walker & Kimball. It is constructed of pink Milford granite, and was modeled after Merton College Chapel at Oxford. Its entrance is prominently located in a cross-gable projection, set in a round-arch opening flanked by smaller round-arch openings. The interior retains many fine original finishes, include oak ceiling trusses, an oaken circulation desk, and oak partitions in the reading areas that are typical of Gothic churches.

The town of Hopedale's first proper library was established in 1840, and was located in a variety of places, including private residences, churches, and town hall, where it occupied the first floor in 1886. This building was built for the town by Joseph Bubier Bancroft, in memory of his wife Sylvia. Bancroft was an executive with the Draper Company, the town's principal employer, and also represented the town as a selectman and in the state legislature. It was built adjacent to Bancroft's house (which still stands), and was donated to the town upon its completion in 1899.

== See also ==
- National Register of Historic Places listings in Worcester County, Massachusetts
