= Calves' Head Club =

Purported republican club in Restoration England

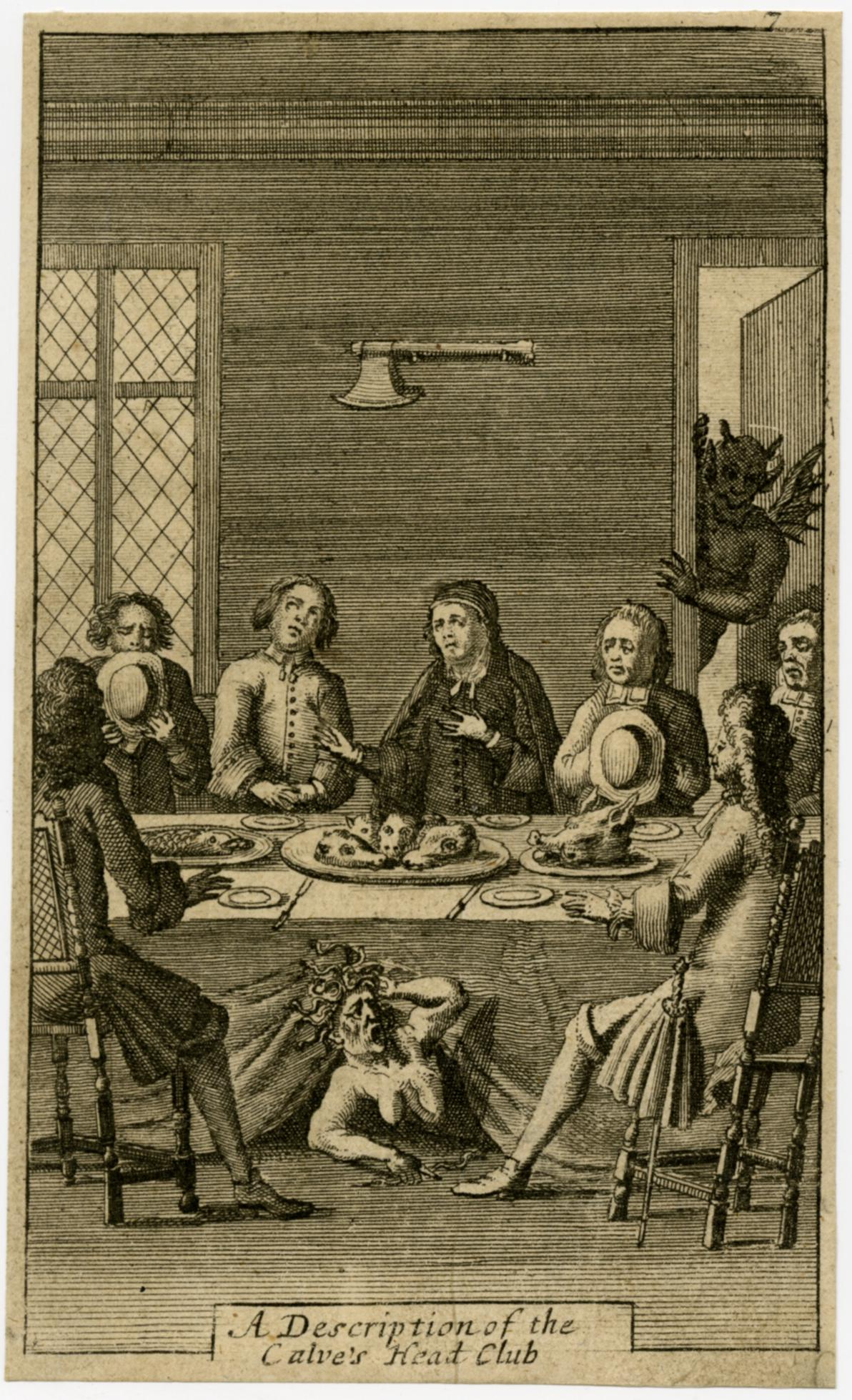
Illustration from The Secret History of the Calve's Head Club (1707). The figure of Envy emerges from under the table, while the Devil enters through a door behind.

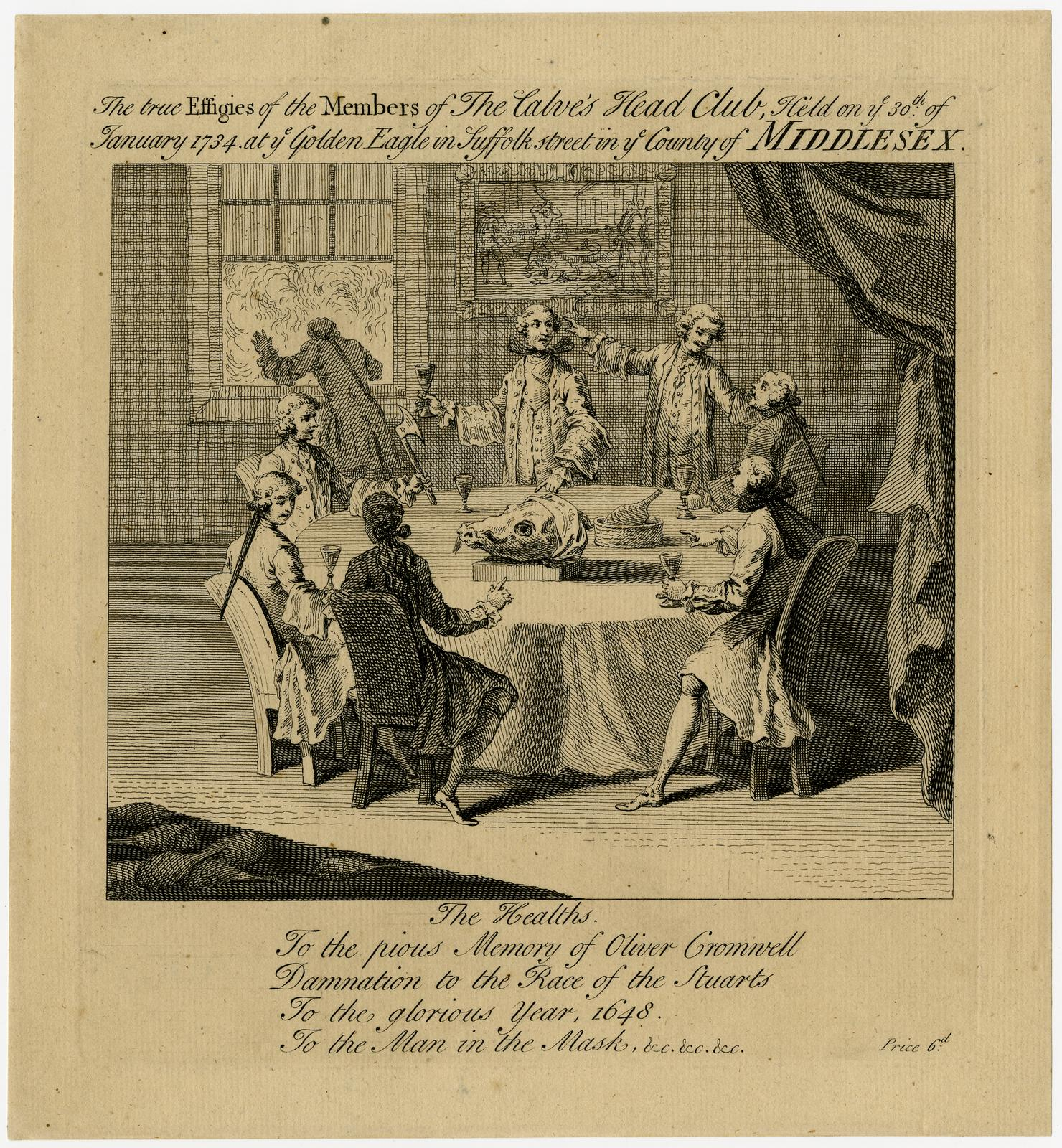
Illustration from The True Effigies of the Members of the Calve's Head Club (1735), a satire on young Whigs and their supposed republicanism.

The Calves Head Club was purportedly established to ridicule the memory of King Charles I of England. After his execution in 1649, a Commonwealth (republic) was established. His son Charles II became King in 1660, and criticism of the monarchy was strictly forbidden. Toward the end of the seventeenth century, rumours began circulating in print about the club and its annual meeting held on 30 January, the anniversary of the execution of Charles I by beheading.

The club is mentioned by Samuel Wesley, a dissenter who later conformed to the Church of England, in the anonymous A Letter from a Country Divine to his Friend in London Concerning the Education of Dissenters in their Private Academies (1703). Wesley claimed to have attended a meeting in 1693 where dissenters blasphemed the memory of Charles I, "discoursing of their Calves-head Club" and a "Design they had at their next Calves-Head Feast, to have a Cold Pye serv'd on the Table, with either a Live-Cat or Hare ... and they had contriv'd to put one of their Company who lov'd Monarchy, and knew nothing of the matter, to cut it up; whereupon, and on the leaping out of the Cat or Hare, they were all to set up a Shout, and cry, Haloo! Old Puss!—to the Honour of the Good Old Cause, and to shew their affection to a Commonwealth." Wesley's biographer Henry D. Rack comments, "It was probably not, as is usually claimed, a meeting of the so-called Calve's Head Club, whose reputation in any case may owe much to tory propaganda. ... Publication was timed to reinforce the current attacks on dissenters and especially on their academies."

The main source for propaganda concerning the Calves' Head Club was the popular work written at least in some part by Tory sympathizer Edward Ward (1667–1731), The secret history of the Calves-Head Club, or The Republican unmasqu'd, wherein is fully shewn the religion of the Calves-Head heroes, in their anniversary thanksgiving songs on the thirtieth of January, by them called anthems; for the years 1693, 1694, 1695, 1696, 1697. Now published, to demonstrate the restless, implacable spirit of a certain party still among us, who are never to be satisfied till the present establishment in church and state is subverted. The work was published in 1703 and reprinted fifteen times between 1703 and 1721. "I was inform'd," the narrator relates,

that it was kept in no fix'd House, but that they remov'd, as they saw convenient; that the Place they met in when he was with 'em, was in a blind Ally, about Moorfields, where an Ax hung up in the Club-Room, and was Reverenced, as a Principal Symbol in this Diabolical Sacrament. Their Bill of Fare, was a large Dish of Calves-heads dressed several ways; a large Pike with a small one in his mouth, as an emblem of Tiranny; a large Cods-head, by which they pretended to represent the Person of the King singly, as by the Calves-heads before, they had done him, together with all them that had suffer'd in his Cause; a Boars-head with an Apple in its mouth, to represent the King by this as Bestial, as by the others they had done Foolish and Tyrannical.

According to The Secret History, after the banquet a copy of the Eikon Basilike (the "Royal Portrait", supposedly printed from the diary of Charles I) was burned while "anthems" were sung. A calf's skull was filled with wine or another liquor and members toasted "The Pious Memory of those worthy Patriots that had kill'd the Tyrant, and deliver'd their Country from his Arbitrary Sway".

According to the Encyclopædia Britannica Eleventh Edition, the club survived till 1734, when the diners were mobbed owing to the popular ill-feeling which their outrages on good taste provoked, and the riot which ensued put a final stop to the meetings.

1 February 1735 Thursday in the evening a disorder of a very particular nature happened in Suffolk-street: ’Tis said that several young gentlemen of distinction having met at a house there, call’d themselves the Calf’s-Head Club; and about seven o’clock a bonfire being lit up before the door, just when it was in the height, they brought a calf’s-head to the window dress’d in a napkin-cap, and after some Huzza’s, threw it into the fire: The mob were entertained with strong-beer, and for some time halloo’d as well as the best; but taking a disgust at some healths which were proposed, grew so outrageous, that they broke all the windows, forc’d themselves into the house, and would probably have pull’d it down, had not the Guards been sent for to prevent further mischief. The damage done within and without the house, is computed at some hundred pounds. The Guards were posted all night in the street, for the security of the neighbourhood.

— Weekly Oracle.

== See also ==
- Jeremiah White (chaplain)
- Secret society
