= Hopedale Junior Senior High School =

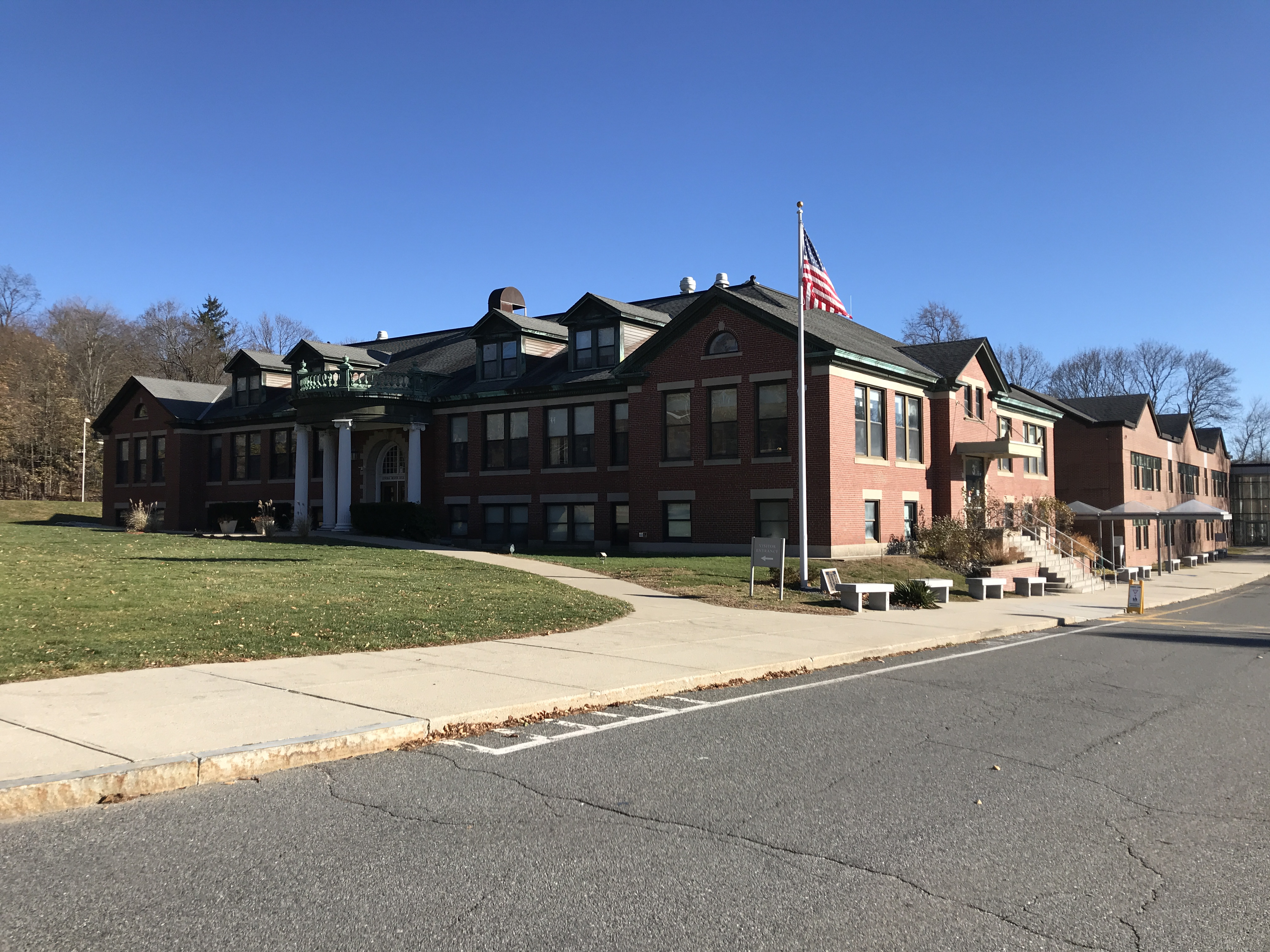
- Hopedale Junior Senior High School

Location
- 25 Adin Street; Hopedale, Massachusetts; United States
- Coordinates: 42°07′43″N 71°32′14″W

Information
- Type: Public
- School district: Hopedale Public Schools
- NCES School ID: 250630000915
- Teaching staff: 44.7 (on FTE basis)
- Grades: 7 to 12
- Enrollment: 456 (2024–2025)
- Student to teacher ratio: 10.2
- Athletics conference: Central Massachusetts Athletic Conference
- Website: www.hopedaleschools.org/o/hjshs

Hopedale Junior Senior High School is a public middle and high school located at 25 Adin Street in Hopedale, Massachusetts, United States.

It is part of the Hopedale Public School District, which includes three other schools.

== Demographics ==
- The data includes grade 7 and 8 students. Grade 7 students = 91, grade 8 students = 84.

According to Massachusetts Department of Elementary and Secondary Education annual statistics, for the 2024-2025 academic year, the demographic enrollment distributions for race, gender and grade level at Hopedale Junior Senior High School are as follows:

Total number of enrolled students: 456
Total number of full-time equivalent educators: 44.7
Therefore, the student to teacher ratio for this school is 10.2:1

Enrollment by Race/Ethnicity (2024-2025)
Race	Enrolled Pupils*	% of District
African American	9	2.0%
Asian	6	1.3%
Hispanic	68	14.9%
Native American	1	0.2%
White	355	77.9%
Native Hawaiian, Pacific Islander	1	0.2%
Multi-Race, Non-Hispanic	16	3.5%
Total	456	100%

* Approximate number of enrolled pupils is calculated based on total number of students in district, multiplied by reported percentage, and rounded to nearest whole student.

Enrollment by gender (2024-2025)
Gender	Enrolled pupils	Percentage
Female	223	48.9%
Male	232	50.88%
Non-binary	1	0.22%
Total	456	100%

Enrollment by Grade
Grade	Pupils Enrolled	Percentage
9	60	13.16%
10	84	18.42%
11	69	15.13%
12	65	14.25%
SP*	3	0.66%
Total	456	100%

* SP = Special Education Beyond Grade 12

== Sports ==
Hopedale athletes compete against schools within the Central Massachusetts Athletic Conference. The school offers soccer, volleyball, track, basketball, lacrosse, softball, baseball, tennis, cheer-leading, cross country and golf.

== See also ==
- List of high schools in Massachusetts
