= Jeremiah White (chaplain) =

English Nonconformist minister and Puritan chaplain

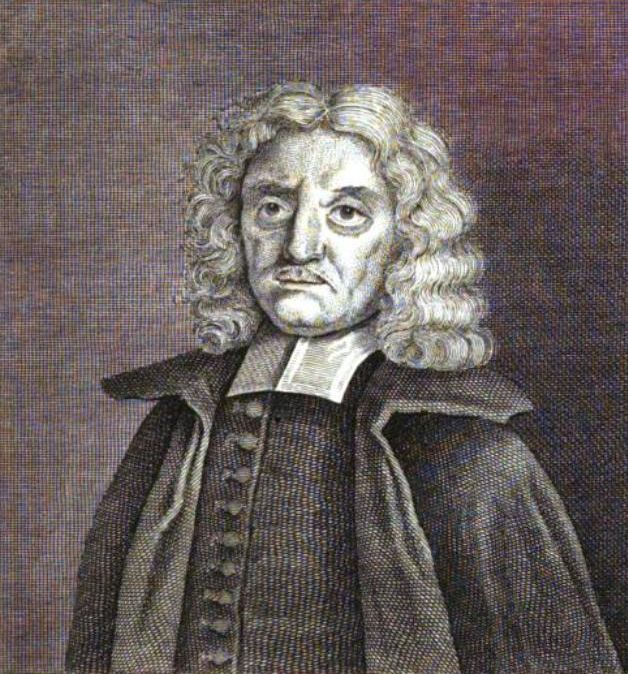
Jeremiah White (1629–1707)

Jeremiah White (1629–1707), was a Nonconformist minister, preacher to the Council of State, and chaplain to Oliver Cromwell.

== Education ==
He was admitted a sizar of Trinity College, Cambridge, on 7 April 1646, proceeded B.A. in 1649, and M.A. in 1653. In his student years he experienced much mental distress owing to religious difficulties, but ultimately found consolation in the doctrine of universal salvation, which he later proposed and defended in a posthumously published book, The Restoration of All Things.

== Chaplain to Cromwell ==
On leaving the university he passed at once to Whitehall, and became domestic chaplain to Cromwell and preacher to the council of state. His attractive person and witty conversation soon made him popular. His position in the household of the Protector brought him into close relationship with his family, and White allowed his ambition to go so far as to aspire to the hand of Cromwell's youngest daughter Frances. It is said that the lady did not look upon him with disfavour. The state of things came to Cromwell's knowledge. With the help of a household spy he managed to surprise the two at a moment when his chaplain was on his knees before his daughter kissing her hand. ‘Jerry,’ who was never at a loss for something to say, explained that for some time past he had been paying his addresses to the lady's waiting woman, but being unsuccessful in his endeavours, he had been driven to soliciting the Lady Frances's interest on his behalf. The opportunity thus offered was not neglected by Cromwell. Reproaching the waiting woman with her slight of his friend, and gaining her consent to the match, he sent for another chaplain and had them married at once.

== At the Restoration ==
At the Stuart Restoration White found himself without fixed income, but abstained from the religious disputes of the day. It is probable that his popularity gained him some form of maintenance. In 1666 the estate of ‘old Mrs. Cromwell’ was in his hands. He collected much information with respect to the sufferings of the English dissenters after the Restoration, but refused a thousand guineas from James II for his manuscript, being disinclined to discredit the established church. His manuscript is not known to be extant. White never himself conformed to the Church of England. He preached occasionally in an independent church in Meeting-house Alley, Queen Street, Lower Rotherhithe, which was built soon after the Restoration. He also preached at Elstree.

White was a conspicuous member of the Calves' Head Club at its annual meetings on 30 January, when the ‘Anniversary Anthem’ was sung, and wine in a calf's skull went the round to the memory of "the patriots who had relieved the nation from tyranny". He died in 1707. A glowing character is given of him in the Monthly Miscellany for 1707 (i. 83–5, 116–18). There is a portrait of White incorrectly attributed to Van Dyck. An engraving is prefixed to his work, A Persuasive to Moderation, published after his death in 1708.

== Bibliography ==
His publications include:

- A Funeral Sermon on the Rev. F. Fuller, London, 1702.
- The Restoration of all Things, (anon.), London, 1712, 1779 (3rd edit.), 1851 (in vol. iii. of the Universalist's Library). (Online via Google books)
- A Persuasive to Moderation, London, 1708 (1725?). This is an enlargement of part of White's preface to Peter Sterry's The Rise, Race, and Royalty of the Kingdom of God in the Soul.
- [Palmer's Nonconformist's Memorial, i. 211; Preface to White's Restoration, 1712; Oldmixon's Hist. of the Stuarts, p. 426; Notes and Queries, 1st ser. vii. 388; Cal. of State Papers, 1665–6, p. 299; Wilson's Dissenting Churches, iv. 367; Thoresby's Diary, i. 7; The Secret Hist. of the Calves' Head Club, p. 10; Granger's Biogr. Hist. (cont. by Noble) ii. 151; Pepys's Diary, 19 Sept. 1660, 13 Oct. 1664; Admission registers of Trinity College, Cambridge, per the Master; University registers, per the Registrary.]
- Extracts from White’s work were published in a volume entitled Universal Restoration, with others of a like nature by ‘some of the most remarkable authors who have written in defence of that interesting subject’ (London, 1798).(Online via Google Books)
