= Apokatastasis =

Restoration to the original or primordial condition

In theology, apokatastasis (Greek: ἀποκατάστασις, romanized: apokatástasis, also spelled apocatastasis) is the restoration of creation to a condition of perfection. In Christianity, the term refers to a form of Christian universalism, often associated with Origen, that includes the ultimate salvation of everyone, including the damned and the Devil. The New Testament (Acts 3:21), speaks of the "apokatastasis of all things". The dogmatic status of apokatastasis is disputed, and some orthodox fathers such as Gregory of Nyssa taught apokatastasis and were never condemned.

Origen was condemned as a heretic at the Synod of Constantinople of 543. However, it is disputed whether the condemnation was about apokatastasis.

Ilaria Ramelli, states the doctrine has a long history and was the Christological and Biblical foundation for many Christian thinkers, stemming from Greek philosophy and Jewish-Christian scriptures.

== Etymology and definition ==
While apokatastasis is derived from the Greek verb apokathistemi, which means "to restore", it first emerged as a doctrine in Zoroastrianism where it is the third time of creation. This period was referred to as wizarishn or the end of history—the time of separation and resolution when evil is destroyed and the world is restored to its original state. The idea of apokatastasis may have been derived from the ancient concept of cosmic cycle, which involves the notion of celestial bodies returning to their original positions after a period of time.

The entry in A Greek–English Lexicon (i.e. Liddell–Scott–Jones, with expansion of definitions and references), gives the following examples of usage:

ἀποκατάστᾰσις, εως, ἡ, restoration, re-establishment;

- "τοῦ ἐνδεοῦς" Aristotle MM, 1205a4; into its nature εἰς φύσιν id. 1204b 36, 1205b 11;
- return to a position, Epicurus, Epistolae, 1, p.8 U.;
- especially of military formations, reversal of a movement, Asclepiodotus, Tacticus, 10.1, 10:6, etc.; generally
- of all things "πάντων" Acts of the Apostles, 3.21;
- of souls, Proclus, Institutio Theologica, 199.
- of the body back into its old form "τῆς φύσιος ἐς τὸ ἀρχαῖον" Aretaeus of Cappadocia CD 1.5; recovery from sickness, SA 1.10;
- "τῶν ὁμήρων εἰς τὰς πατρίδας" Polybius 3.99.6; εἰς ἀ. ἐλθεῖν, into the restoration of the affairs of a city, 4.23.1;

Astrological uses:

- ἀ. ἄστρων return of the stars to the same place in the heavens as in the former year, Plutarch 2.937f, Diodorus Siculus 12.36, etc., particularly the restoration of the wandering Egyptian New Year to the heliacal rising of Sirius at the completion of the Sothic cycle;
- periodic return of the cosmic cycle, Stoicorum Veterum Fragmenta 2.184,190; that is, completion of the c. 26,000 year cycle of the precession of the equinoxes, the so called "Great Year";
- of a planet, return to a place in the heavens occupied at a former epoch, Antiochus of Athens ap. Cat.Cod.Astr. 7.120,121; but, zodiacal revolution, Paulus Alexandrinus Paul.Al.T.1; opposite: antapocatastasis ἀνταπ. (q. v.), Dorotheus of Sidon Doroth. ap. Cat.Cod.Astr.2.196.9;
- restoration of sun and moon after eclipse, Plato Axiochus 370b.

The word is reasonably common in papyri.

== Concepts ==
=== Stoicism ===
According to Edward Moore, apokatastasis was first properly conceptualized in early Stoic thought, particularly by Chrysippus. The return (apokatastasis) of the planets and stars to their proper celestial signs, namely their original positions, would spark a conflagration of the universe (ekpyrosis). The original position was believed to consist of an alignment of celestial bodies with Cancer. Thereafter, from fire, rebirth would commence, and this cycle of alternate destruction and recreation was correlated with a divine Logos. Antapokatastasis is a counter-recurrence when the stars and planets align with Capricorn, which would mark destruction by a universal flood.

The Stoics identified Zeus with an alternately expanding and contracting fire constituting the universe. Its expansion was described as Zeus turning his thoughts outwards, resulting in the creation of the material cosmos, and its contraction, the apokatastasis, as Zeus returning to self-contemplation. Leibniz explored both Stoic and his understanding of Origen's philosophy in two essays written shortly before his death, Apokatastasis and Apokatastasis panton (1715).

=== Judaism ===
The concept of "restore" or "return" in the Hebrew Bible is the common Hebrew verb שוב, as used in Malachi 4:6, the only use of the verb form of apokatastasis in the Septuagint. This is used in the "restoring" of the fortunes of Job, and is also used in the sense of rescue or return of captives, and in the restoration of Jerusalem.

This is similar to the concept of tikkun olam in Hasidic Judaism.

=== New Testament ===
The word, apokatastasis, appears only once in the New Testament, in Acts 3:21. Peter healed a beggar with a disability and then addressed the astonished onlookers. His sermon set Jesus in the Jewish context, the fulfiller of the Abrahamic Covenant, and says:

[19] Repent ye therefore, and be converted, that your sins may be blotted out, when the times of refreshing shall come from the presence of the Lord; [20] And he shall send Jesus Christ, which before was preached unto you: [21] Whom the heaven must receive until the times of restitution of all things, which God hath spoken by the mouth of all his holy prophets since the world began.

— Acts 3:19–21 KJV

Grammatically, the relative pronoun "ὧν" ("of which", genitive plural), could refer either to "χρόνων" ("of times") or to "πάντων" ("of all" or "of all things"), which means that it is either the times of which God spoke or the all things of which God spoke.

The usual view taken of Peter's use of the "apokatastasis of all the things about which God spoke" is that it refers to the restoration of the Kingdom of Israel and/or the Garden of Eden and not "all things that ever existed".

The verbal form of apokatastasis is found in the Septuagint: Malachi 3:23 (i.e. Malachi 4:6); a prophecy of Elijah turning back the hearts of the children to their fathers; in Matthew 17:11 ("he will restore all things"), echoing Malachi, and in Hebrews 13:19 ("that I may be restored to you the sooner").

Nineteenth-century German theologian Jakob Eckermann interpreted "the 'apokatastasis of all things' to mean the universal emendation of religion by the doctrine of Christ, and the 'times of refreshing' to be the day of renewal, the times of the Messiah."

=== Patristic Christianity ===
The significance of apokatastasis in early Christianity is currently something of a disputed question. In particular, some question whether Origen, often listed as the most notable advocate of universal salvation, did in fact teach or believe in such a doctrine.

Frederick W. Norris argues that the positions that Origen took on the issue of universal salvation have often seemed contradictory. He then writes that Origen never decided to stress exclusive salvation or universal salvation, to the strict exclusion of either case, therefore concludes that Origen probably kept his view of salvation economically 'open' for a greater effectiveness. On the other hand, Brian E. Daley in his handbook of patristic eschatology argued that Origen strongly believed in the final salvation of all humans and sometimes referred to it as apokatastasis. More recently, leading Patristic scholar Ilaria Ramelli has concluded that not only did Origen embrace the doctrine of apokatastasis, but that it was central to all his theological and philosophical thought. She remarks, "In Origen's thought, the doctrine of apokatastasis is interwoven with his anthropology, eschatology, theology, philosophy of history, theodicy, and exegesis; for anyone who takes Origen's thought seriously and with a deep grasp of it, it is impossible to separate the apokatastasis theory from all the rest, so as to reject it but accept the rest."

The Alexandrian school, the first Christian educational center, seems to have generally affirmed apokatastasis and adapted some Platonic terminology and ideas to Christianity while explaining and differentiating the new faith from all the others. Gregory of Nyssa is also understood to have espoused a universally salvific apokatastasis, though Maspero argues that Gregory spoke solely of universal resurrection and not of universal salvation. Universal salvation in the form of apokatastasis is also seen in the Ambrosiaster, attributed to Ambrose of Milan. Gregory of Nazianzus discussed it without reaching a decision.

Eventually, Origen started to be condemned throughout the early church in local councils, though not apokatastasis specifically. This changed definitively in the sixth century. A local Synod of Constantinople (543) condemned a form of apokatastasis as being Anathema, and the Anathema was formally submitted to the Fifth Ecumenical Council of Constantinople (553). The term apokatastasis is mentioned in the 14th of the 15 anathemas against Origen of 553: "If anyone shall say ... that in this pretended apokatastasis, spirits only will continue to exist, as it was in the feigned pre-existence: let him be anathema."

Konstantinovsky (2009) states that the uses of apokatastasis in Christian writings prior to the Synod of Constantinople (543) and the anathemas (553) pronounced against "Origenists" and Evagrius Ponticus were neutral and referred primarily to concepts similar to the general "restoration of all things spoken" (restitutio omnium quae locutus est Deus) of Peter in Acts 3:21 and not for example the universal reconciliation of all souls which had ever been.

=== Gnosticism ===
The gnostic Gospel of Philip (likely composed between 180–350 AD) contains the term itself but does not teach universal reconciliation:

There is a rebirth and an image of rebirth. It is certainly necessary to be born again through the image. Which one? Resurrection. The image must rise again through the image. The bridal chamber and the image must enter through the image into the truth: this is the restoration (apokatastasis). Not only must those who produce the name of the Father and the Son and the Holy Spirit, do so, but have produced them for you. If one does not acquire them, the name ("Christian") will also be taken from him.

== In Christian theology ==
=== Early Christianity ===
Clement of Alexandria (c. 150 – c. 215) generally uses the term apokatastasis to refer to the "restoration" of the "gnostic" Christians, rather than that of the universe or of all Christians, but with universal implications. Origen's stance is disputed, with some works saying he taught apokatastasis would involve universal salvation, even the absolute equality of all souls and spirits. Gregory of Nyssa's notion of apokatastasis is also claimed to have involved universal salvation though in other respects it differed from Origen's.

In early Christian theological usage, apokatastasis was couched as God's eschatological victory over evil and believed to entail a purgatorial state. The word was still very flexible at that time, but in the mid-6th century, it became virtually a technical term, as it usually means today, to refer to a specifically Origenistic doctrine of universal salvation.

Maximus the Confessor outlined God's plan for "universal" salvation alongside warnings of final punishment for the wicked. He divided apokatastasis into three restorations: of the virtuous individual, of nature, and of the sinful powers of the soul. While the last of these meant that even sinners will be restored to a clear knowledge of God, Maximus seems to have believed that they will not attain to the same communion with God as the righteous and thus will in a sense be eternally punished.

=== Luther ===
The Vulgate translation of apokatastasis, "in tempora restitutionis omnium quae locutus est Deus" ("the restitution of all things of which God has spoken"), was taken up by Luther to mean the day of the restitution of the creation, but in Luther's theology the day of restitution was also the day of resurrection and judgment, not the restitution of the wicked. In Luther's Bible he rendered the Greek apokatastasis with the German herwiedergebracht werde; "will be brought back". This sense continued to be used in Lutheran sermons.

Luther explicitly disowned belief that the devils would ultimately reach blessedness.

=== 19th-century Universalism ===
During the 19th and early 20th centuries several histories published by Universalists, including Hosea Ballou (1829), Thomas Whittemore (1830), John Wesley Hanson (1899) and George T. Knight (1911), argued that belief in universal reconciliation was found in early Christianity and in the Reformation, and ascribed Universalist beliefs to Origen, Clement of Alexandria, and others.

=== Recent works ===
In recent writing, apokatastasis is generally understood as involving some form of universal reconciliation, without necessarily attributing this understanding to Origen and other Fathers of the Church.

- Augustin Gretillat, in Exposé de théologie systématique (1892), described apokatastasis as universal reconciliation.
- Heinrich Köstlin's Realencyklopädie für protestantische Theologie (1896), translated in the Schaff-Herzog Encyclopedia of Religious Knowledge, described apokatastasis as universal reconciliation.
- The 1911 Catholic Encyclopedia defined apokatastasis as "a name given in the history of theology to the doctrine which teaches that a time will come when all free creatures shall share in the grace of salvation; in a special way, the devils and lost souls."
- Maurice Canney, An Encyclopaedia of Religions (1921): "Apocatastasis became a theological term denoting the doctrine ... that all men would be converted and admitted to everlasting happiness".
- Albrecht Oepke, Theological Dictionary of the New Testament (1933): "Apokatastasis cannot denote the conversion of persons but only the reconstitution or establishment of things."
- Constantinos A. Patrides surveyed the history of apokatastasis in his Salvation of Satan.
- G. C. Berkouwer, The Return of Christ (1972), devoted a whole chapter, under the heading "Apocatastasis?", to the topic of universal reconciliation, "sometimes technically known as apocatastasis".
- John Meyendorff, Byzantine Theology: Historical Trends and Doctrinal Themes (1987) defined apokatastasis as "the idea that the whole of creation and all of humanity will ultimately be 'restored' to their original state of bliss".
- Michael McGarry in A Dictionary of the Jewish-Christian Dialogue (1995) defined apokatastasis as "one particular Christian expression of a general theology of universalism ... the belief that at the end of time all creatures—believers and sinners alike—would be restored in Christ".
- Peter Stravinskas, in the short article on apokatastasis in Our Sunday Visitor's Catholic Encyclopedia (1998) and the still shorter entry in his Catholic Dictionary (1993), defines it as the belief "that all rational creatures are saved, including the fallen angels and unrepentant sinners".
- Stravinskas identifies apokatastasis with universalism or universal reconciliation, and some of the older sources do so also. In addition, two recent works that do not discuss apokatastasis give the corresponding Greek word as the source from which "universalism" is derived. But most writers do not simply identify apokatastasis with universal reconciliation. González points out that a distinction exists, in that "it is possible to hold universalist views without believing that all of creation will return to its original state".
- Both Ludlow and McGarry state that the word apokatastasis is today usually understood as referring to one specific doctrine of universal salvation, not to all versions of universalism.
- A Concise Dictionary of Theology (2000) describes apokatastasis as "a theory ... that all angels and human beings, even the demons and the damned, will ultimately be saved".
- Morwenna Ludlow (2001), in Universal Salvation: Eschatology in the Thought of Gregory of Nyssa and Karl Rahner, writes that, though the meaning was very flexible until the mid-6th century, "the word apokatastasis is now usually used to refer to a specifically Origenistic doctrine of universal salvation".
- Peter L. Berger, in his book Questions of Faith (2003), calls apokatastasis "the conviction that, in the end, all will be saved and the entire creation will be reconciled with God".

== See also ==
- Catastasis
- Christian Universalism
- Monad (philosophy)
- Panentheism
- Problem of evil
- Purgatory
- Restorationism
- Repairing the World (Judaism)
- Trinitarian Universalism
- Universal reconciliation
- World to Come

== Bibliography ==
- Benedetto, Robert; Duke, James O (2008), The New Westminster Dictionary of Church History, vol. 1.
- Itter, Andrew C (2009), Esoteric teaching in the Stromateis of Clement of Alexandria.
