= Synod of Constantinople (543) =

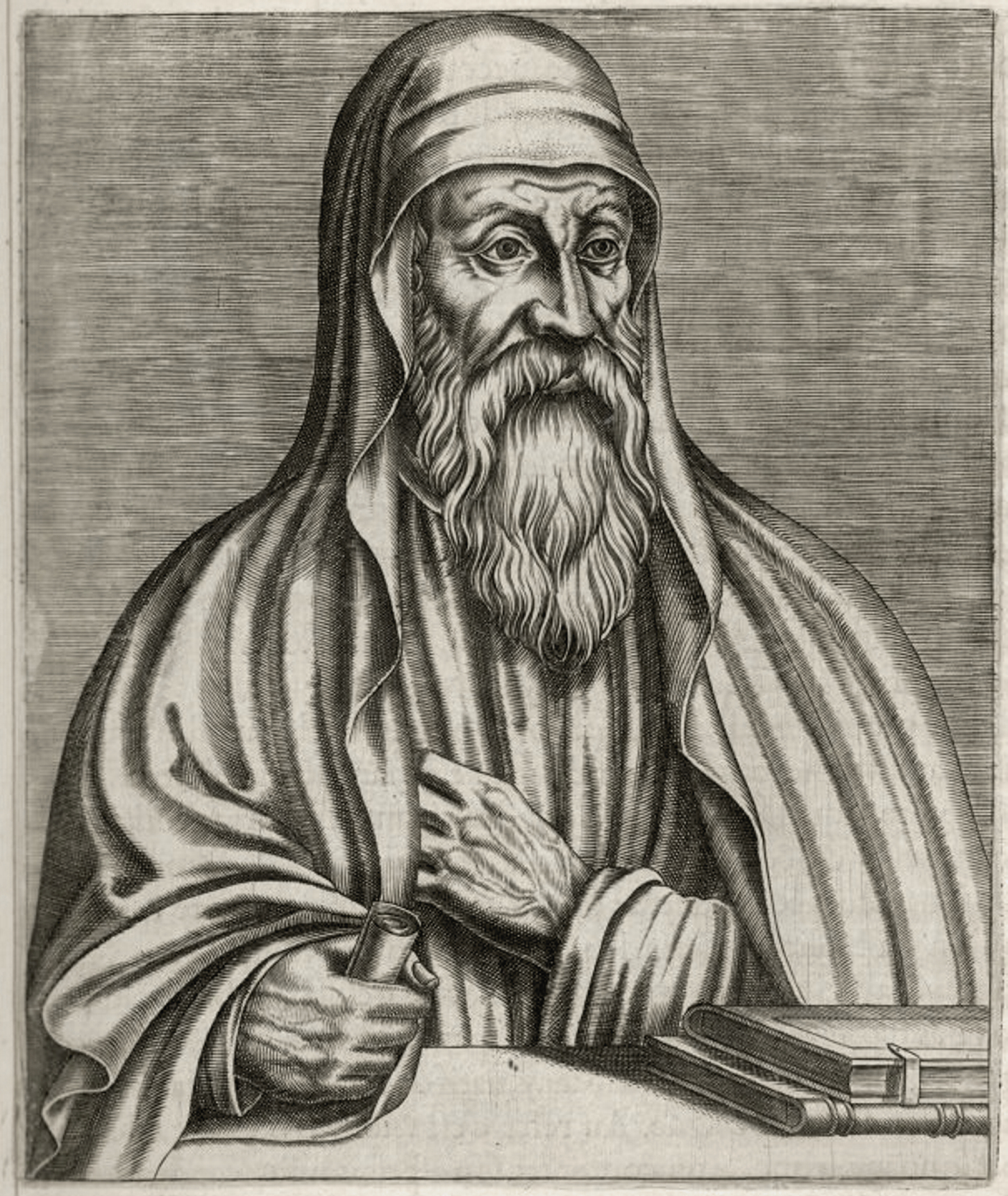
Origen, the subject of the synod

The AD 543 Synod of Constantinople was a local synod convened to condemn Origen and his views, which was accompanied by an edict of Justinian I in 543 or 544. It was then ratified by the Fifth Ecumenical Council in 553.

A concept of preexistence was advanced by Origen, a Church Father who lived in the second and third century. Origen believed that each human soul is created by God at some time prior to conception. The theologians Tertullian and Jerome held to traducianism and creationism, respectively, and the synod condemned Origen's views as anathema. Various beliefs espoused by Origen rooted in his theory concerning the origin and destination of the soul—principally apocatastasis both in reference to a restoration of the world separate from a Final Judgment and to the ultimate salvation of all souls before the end of time—were also condemned as anathema.

It was also related to the Three-Chapter Controversy, a phase in the Chalcedonian controversy.

== See also ==
- Apocatastasis

== Sources ==
- Meyendorff, John (1989). Imperial unity and Christian divisions: The Church 450-680 A.D. The Church in history. Vol. 2. Crestwood, NY: St. Vladimir's Seminary Press. ISBN 9780881410563.
