= John Wesley Hanson =

American Universalist minister (1823–1901)

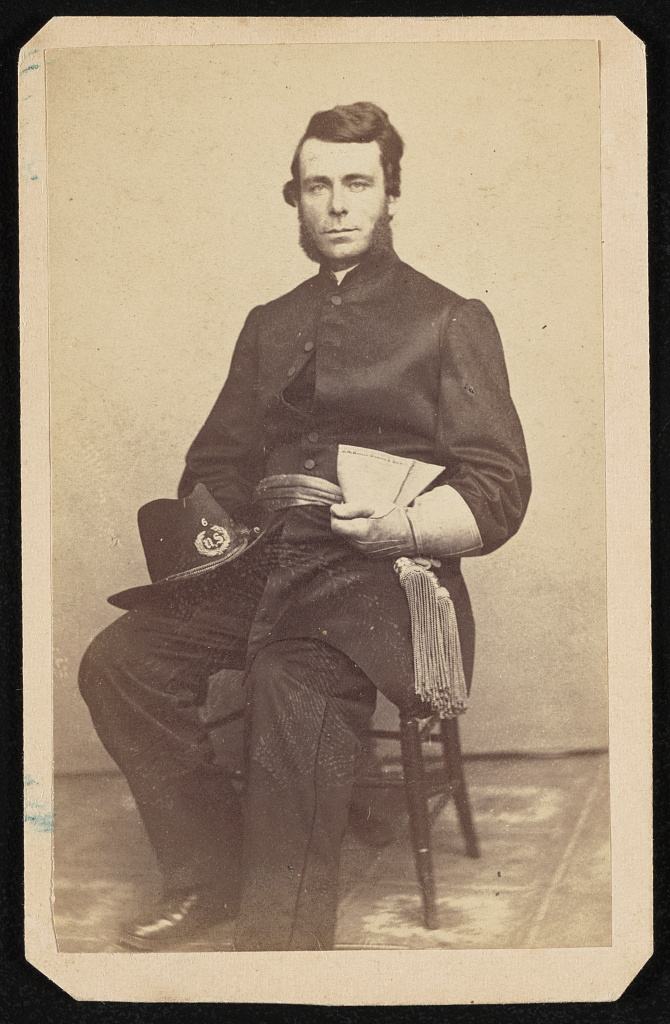
John Wesley Hanson wearing the uniform of the 6th Massachusetts Infantry Regiment.

John Wesley Hanson D.D. (1823–1901) was an American Universalist minister and a notable Universalist historian advancing the claim that Universalism was the belief of early Christianity. He was born in Boston.

He is also notable for his eyewitness accounts of his time as chaplain to one of the Unattached Companies Massachusetts Volunteer Militia during the American Civil War and for publishing his own New Testament "Hanson's edited New Testament" (1885), which was a revision of the English Revised Version with "baptism" changed for "immersion" and other changes.

He was the eldest of five siblings. His younger sister was Harriet Hanson Robinson (1825–1911) wife of William Stevens Robinson (1818–1876), social reformers in Malden, Massachusetts.

In 1845 he arrived in Wentworth, New Hampshire as Universalist minister. In the 1860s he was chaplain to the Sixth regiment of Massachusetts volunteers. In the 1870s he went as a Universalist missionary to Britain, becoming the pastor of St. Paul's Universalist Church, Glasgow, Scotland. He then became minister of the Universalist New Covenant Church of Chicago, where he worked on his New Testament.

He is best known for his history arguing that universalism dominated early church thought before Augustine; Universalism: The Prevailing Doctrine of the Christian Church (1899) which followed Universalist Hosea Ballou's Ancient History of Universalism. (1828) His view of early church history was carried on by George T. Knight. Hanson is cited as a primary source in the 1911 edition of the Encyclopædia Britannica, and New Schaff-Herzog Encyclopedia of Religious Knowledge (1908–14) articles on Universalism. Hanson and Knight's reading of church history has been challenged, but has also found defenders, such as Ilaria Ramelli.

== Works ==
- Witnesses to the Truth: Containing Passages From Distinguished Authors, Developing the Great Truth of Universal Salvation: With an Appendix, Exhibiting the Enormity of the Doctrine of Endless Misery, 1854.
- Historical sketch of the old Sixth regiment of Massachusetts volunteers during its three campaigns in 1861, 1862, 1863, and 1864. by John W. Hanson, Chaplain. Boston, Lee and Shepard, 1866.
- Christian Chorals: A Hymn and Tune Book for the Congregation and the Home. 4th Edition, 1870.
- The Greek Word Aion--Aionios, Translated Everlasting--Eternal, in the Holy Bible Shown to Denote Limited Duration. 1875.
- Bible Proofs of Universal Salvation, 1877.
- The Bible Hell: The Words Rendered Hell in the Bible, Sheol, Hadees, Tartarus, & Gehenna, Shown to Denote a State of Temporal Duration. All the Texts containing the Word Examined and Explained in Harmony with the Doctrine of Universal Salvation, 1878.
- A Brief Debate on Universal Salvation and Endless Punishment Between John Wesley Hanson. D.D., And Rev. John Hogarth Lozier, 1879.
- Aiōn-Aiōnios: an excursus on the Greek word rendered everlasting, eternal, etc., in the Holy Bible, 1880.
- A Cloud of Witnesses Containing Selections from the Writings of Poets and Other Literary and Celebrated Persons, Expressive of the Universal Triumph of Good Over Evil, 1880. [This appears to be a later edition of Witnesses to the Truth.]
- The Prayer of Prayers: Twelve Discourses On the Lord's Prayer, 1882.
- The New Covenant: Volume II.--Acts, the Epistles, Revelation, 1886.
- Bible Proofs of Universal Salvation; Containing the Principal Passages of Scripture that Teach the Final Holiness and Happiness of All Mankind, 6th Edition, 1885.
- Voices of the Faith A Birthday Book Containing a Selection for Every Day in the Year from Writers Expressing the Universalist Faith, 3rd Edition, 1887.
- A Pocket Cyclopedia: Brief Explanations of Religious Terms As Understood by Universalists, 1892.
- Manna: A Book of Daily Worship, Containing Brief Scripture Lessons and Prayers for Individual and Family Use, For Every Day in the Year, 1892.
- Bible Threatenings Explained; Or, Passages of Scripture Sometimes Quoted to Prove Endless Punishment Shown to Teach Consequences of Limited Duration, 7th Edition, 1893.
- The World's Congress of Religions The Addresses and Papers Delivered Before the Parliament, and An Abstract of the Congresses Held in the Art Institute, 1894. [Hanson was the editor of this work.]
- The Life and Works of the World's Greatest Evangelist Dwight L. Moody: A Complete and Authentic Review of the Marvelous Career of the Most Remarkable Religious General in History, 1900.
