= Hopedale, Massachusetts =

- Town
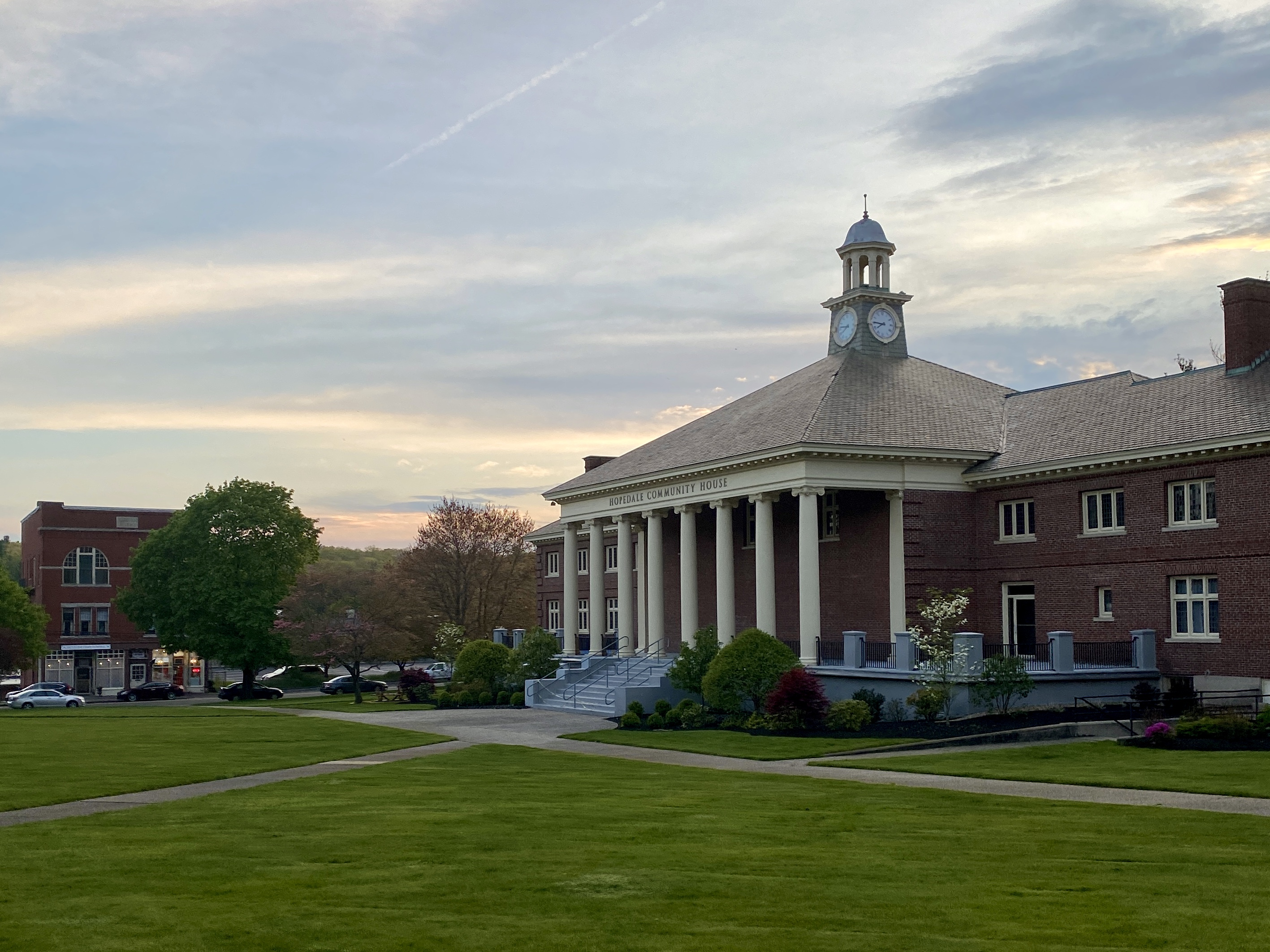
- Hopedale Community House

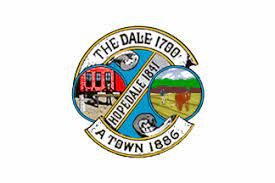
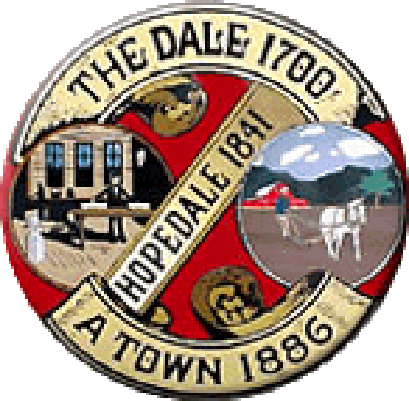
- Flag Seal

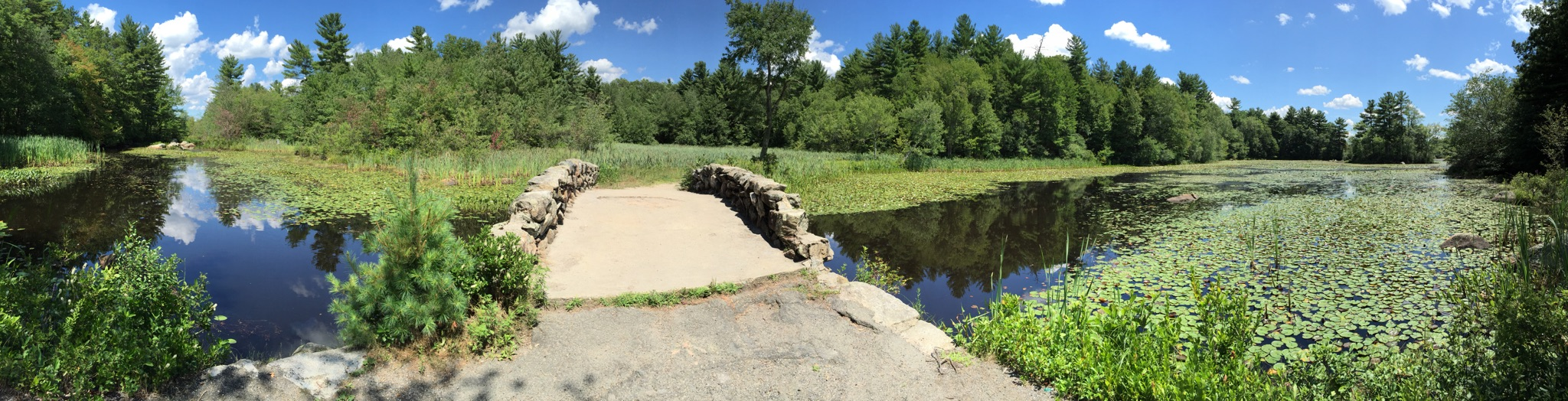
- Hopedale Pond

- Location in Worcester County and the state of Massachusetts
- Coordinates: 42°07′50″N 71°32′30″W
- Country: United States
- State: Massachusetts
- County: Worcester
- Settled: 1660
- Incorporated: 1886

Government
  - Type: Open town meeting
  - Town Administrator: Mitch Ruscitti
  - Board of Selectmen: Scott Savage; Bernard Stock; Glenda Hazard

Area
  - Total: 5.3 sq mi (13.8 km^{2})
  - Land: 5.2 sq mi (13.4 km^{2})
  - Water: 0.15 sq mi (0.4 km^{2})
- Elevation: 279 ft (85 m)

Population (2024)
  - Total: 6,063 (estimate)
  - Density: 1,170/sq mi (452/km^{2})
- Time zone: UTC-5 (Eastern)
  - Summer (DST): UTC-4 (Eastern)
- ZIP code: 01747
- Area code: 508 / 774
- FIPS code: 25-30945
- GNIS feature ID: 0618366
- Website: www.hopedale-ma.gov

Hopedale is a town in Worcester County, Massachusetts, United States. It is located 25 miles southwest of Boston, in eastern Massachusetts. With origins as a Christian utopian community, the town was later home to Draper Corporation, a large loom manufacturer throughout the 20th century until its closure in 1980. Today, Hopedale has become a bedroom community for professionals working in Greater Boston and is home to highly ranked public schools. The population was 6,017 as of the 2020 census. It contains the census-designated place of the same name.

== History ==
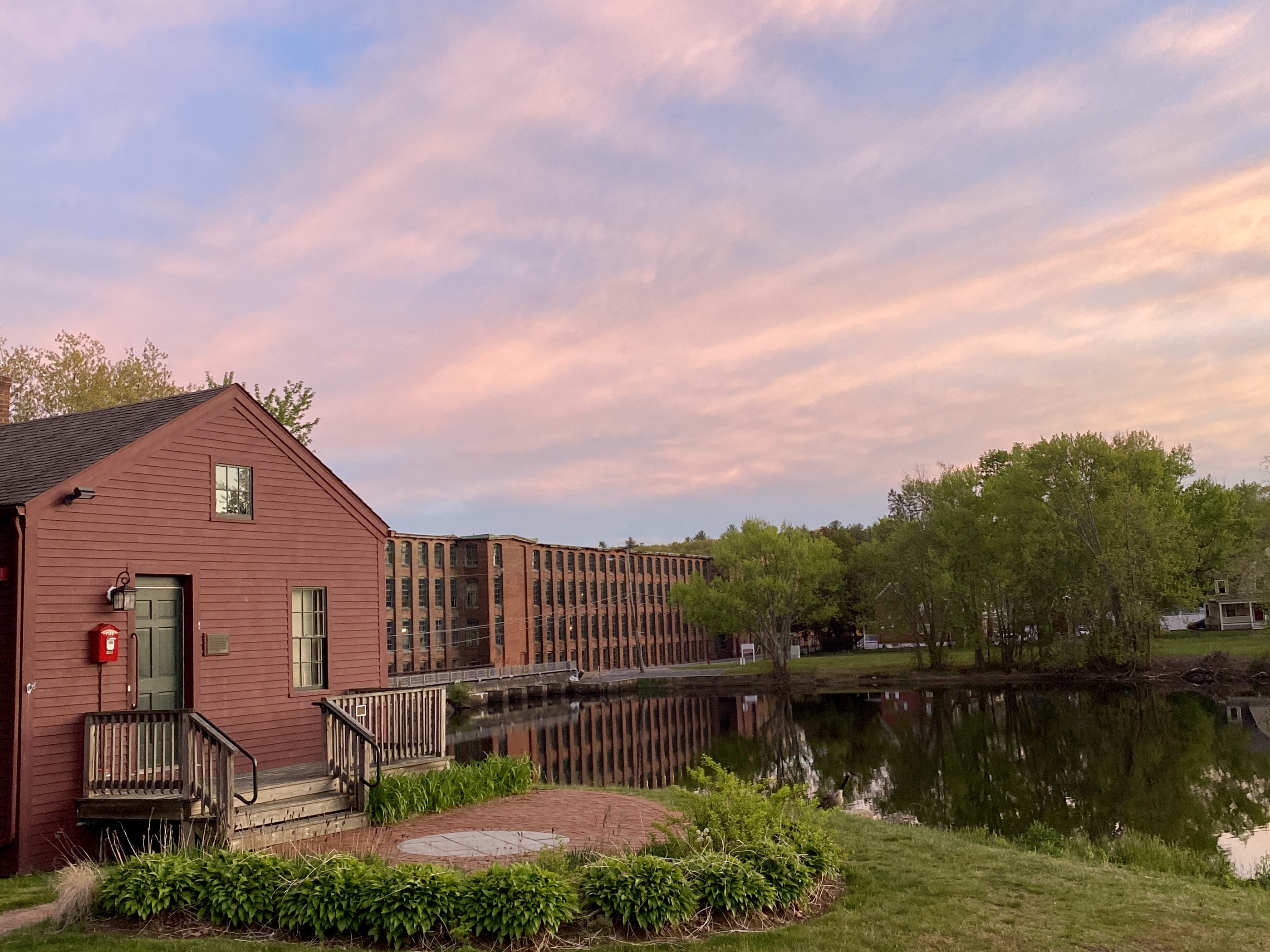
The Little Red Shop, Hopedale Pond, and the Draper Factory

Hopedale was first settled by Europeans in 1660. Benjamin Albee built a mill on what is now the south end of Hopedale in 1664. A 64-square-mile (170 km^{2}) area of the Blackstone Valley was incorporated as the town of Mendon. In 1780, Milford separated from Mendon. On August 26, 1841, Adin Ballou, along with the Practical Christians, gave Hopedale its name, within the town of Milford. Ballou and the Practical Christians established the Hopedale Community based on Christian and socialist ideologies in 1842. The utopian commune went bankrupt in 1856, and its assets were purchased by Ebenezer and George Draper, manufacturers of looms. Various industries developed under the direction of the Draper brothers, including the Hopedale Machine Company and Hopedale Furnace Company. The town was officially incorporated in 1886 when it separated from Milford. George Draper designed, paid for, and constructed the town hall, which is constructed of granite from Milford and sandstone, and was dedicated in 1887. The Unitarian church was another gift from the Drapers, and the Bancroft Memorial Library was a gift from a superintendent at the plant. The marble sculpture outside the library was paid for by the Drapers and shipped from Rome in 1904. In 1905, women were granted permission to swim at the town beach.

The family loom business continued to develop with subsequent generations, and at its peak, the Draper Corporation was the largest maker of textile looms in the United States. The company was acquired by Rockwell International in 1967. The Draper factory in Hopedale closed on August 29, 1980. There have been several attempts at redeveloping the facility and its surrounding property, most recently in 2007, 2018, and finally, 2020, when it was announced that it would be fully demolished. The Draper factory was slated to be demolished beginning in July 2020, and as of October 2020, demolition has begun. To many of the citizens’ surprise, the latter attempt was successful, and the land where the factory once sat has been completely leveled and cleaned. To this day, only a few of the external satellite buildings remain scattered throughout downtown. It is not yet known what the land will be used for.

Hopedale is included in the Blackstone River Valley National Heritage Corridor, although much of the town lies within the Charles River watershed.

== Geography ==
According to the United States Census Bureau, the town has a total area of 5.3 square miles (14 km^{2}), of which 5.2 square miles (13 km^{2}) is land and 0.2 square miles (0.52 km^{2}), or 3.20%, is water. The largest body of water is Hopedale Pond, located close to the town center. Hopedale Pond is surrounded by the Parklands, a 275-acre public nature reserve with walking trails, designed in 1899 by a firm operated by Frederick Law Olmsted.

The central business district, known by Census Bureau as the Hopedale Census-Designated Place (CDP), is located at 42°07′48″N 71°32′23″W (42.129872, −71.539594).

According to the Census Bureau, the CDP has a total area of 4.5 km^{2} (1.7 sq mi), of which 4.5 km^{2} (1.7 sq mi) is land and 0.1 km^{2} (0.039 sq mi) (1.15%) is water.

Hopedale is located in the Blackstone Valley.

== Demographics ==
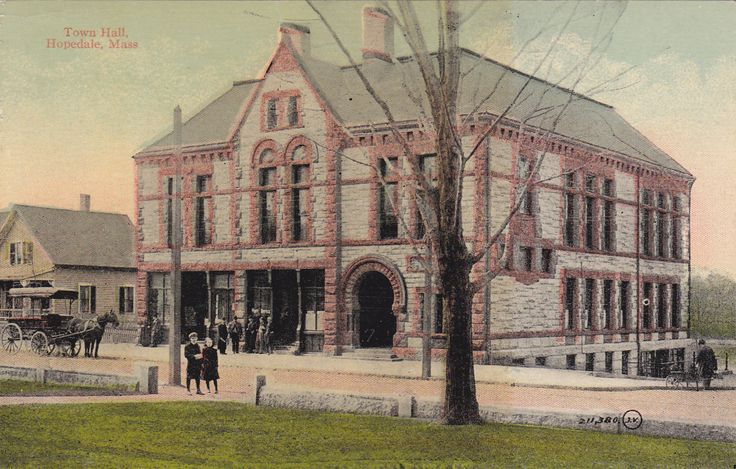
Hopedale Town Hall (c. 1887)

=== Town ===
Historical population
Year	Pop.	±%
1890	1,176	—
1900	2,087	+77.5%
1910	2,188	+4.8%
1920	2,777	+26.9%
1930	2,973	+7.1%
1940	3,113	+4.7%
1950	3,479	+11.8%
1960	3,987	+14.6%
1970	4,292	+7.6%
1980	3,905	−9.0%
1990	5,666	+45.1%
2000	5,907	+4.3%
2010	5,911	+0.1%
2020	6,017	+1.8%
2022*	6,008	−0.1%
* = population estimate. Source: United States Census records and Population Estimates Program data.

At the 2010 census there were 5,911 people, 2,263 households, and 1,572 families in the town. The population density was 1,143.1 inhabitants per square mile (441.4/km^{2}). There were 2,289 housing units at an average density of 444.0 units per square mile (171.4 units/km^{2}). The racial makeup of the town was 96.1% White, 0.6% Black or African American, 0.02% Native American, 0.4% Asian, 0.51% from other races, and 0.7% from two or more races. Hispanic or Latino of any race were 2.2%.

Of the 2,240 households 35.8% had children under the age of 18 living with them, 58.8% were married couples living together, 8.8% had a female householder with no husband present, and 29.8% were non-families. 25.9% of households were one person and 12.8% were one person aged 65 or older. The average household size was 2.58 and the average family size was 3.13.

The age distribution was 23.9% under the age of 18, 5.1% from 18 to 24, 30.8% from 25 to 44, 22.4% from 45 to 64, and 16.7% 65 or older. The median age was 39 years. For every 100 females, there were 90.9 males. For every 100 females age 18 and over, there were 87.7 males.

The median household income was $107,550 and the per capita income was $42,756. Males had a median income of $47,380 versus $31,144 for females. The per capita income for the town was $24,791. About 2.9% of families and 4.0% of the population were below the poverty line, including 2.7% of those under age 18 and 6.5% of those age 65 or over.

=== CDP ===
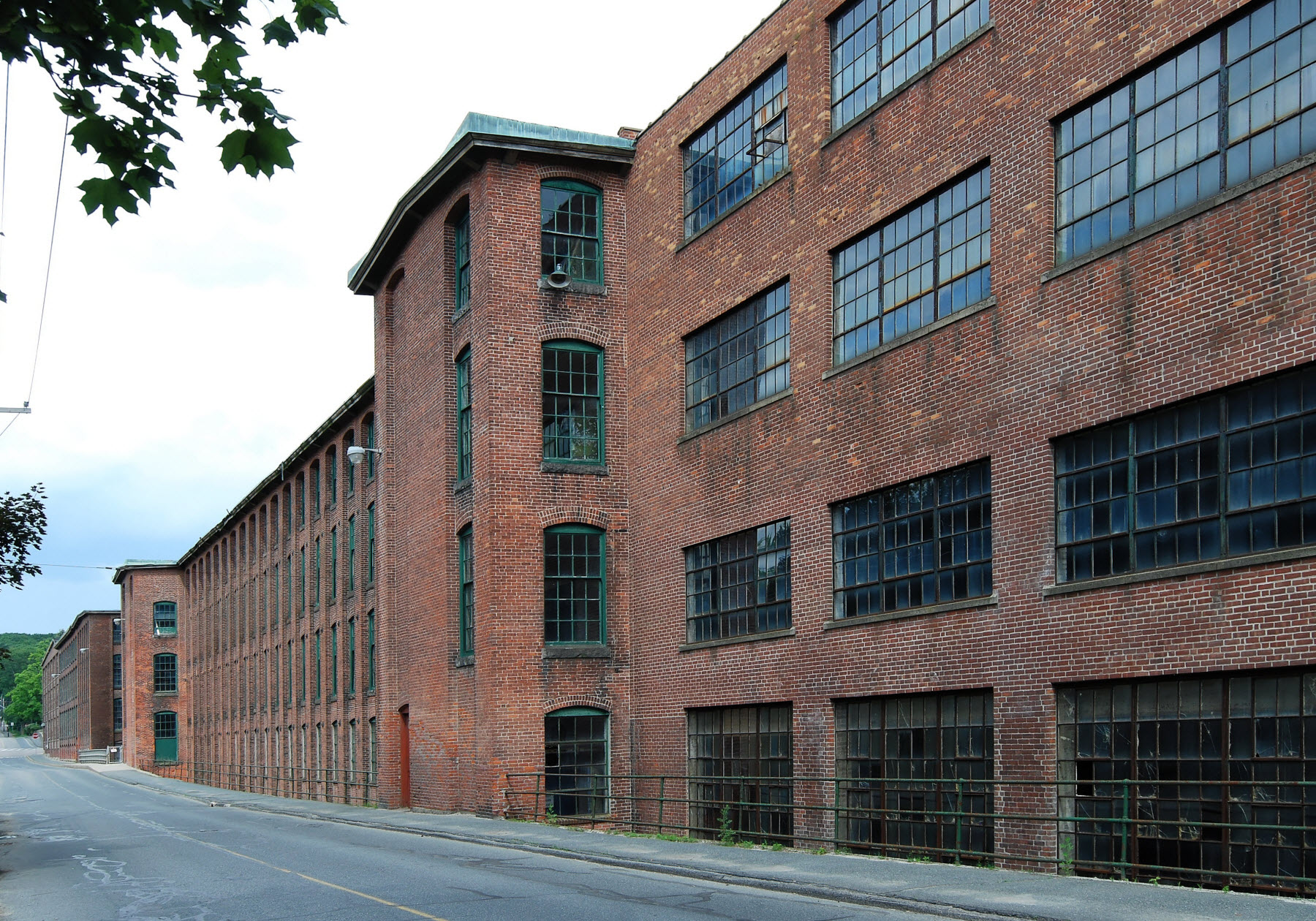
Draper Factory

As of the census of 2000, there were 4,158 people, 1,616 households, and 1,082 families in the Hopedale CDP, comprising the main village in the town. The population density was 933.4 people/km^{2} (2,417 people/mi^{2}). There were 1,657 housing units at an average density of 372.0 units/km^{2} (963 units/mi^{2}). The racial makeup of the CDP was 97.43% White, 0.51% Black or African American, 0.02% Native American, 0.67% Asian, 0.63% from other races, and 0.75% from two or more races. Hispanic or Latino of any race were 1.30% of the population.

Of the 1,616 households 34.5% had children under the age of 18 living with them, 55.3% were married couples living together, 9.3% had a female householder with no husband present, and 33.0% were non-families. 29.0% of households were one person and 14.4% were one person aged 65 or older. The average household size was 2.52 and the average family size was 3.15.

The age distribution was 26.6% under the age of 18, 5.2% from 18 to 24, 30.7% from 25 to 44, 22.4% from 45 to 64, and 15.0% 65 or older. The median age was 39 years. For every 100 females, there were 91.3 males. For every 100 females age 18 and over, there were 86.0 males.

The median household income was $58,750 and the median family income was $67,417. Males had a median income of $45,694 versus $29,740 for females. The per capita income for the CDP was $24,088. About 3.4% of families and 4.7% of the population were below the poverty line, including 3.2% of those under age 18 and 5.8% of those age 65 or over.

== Government ==
The state representative is Brian W. Murray (D). The state senator is Ryan Fattman (R). The government councilor is Paul DePalo (D). The federal representative is Jake Auchincloss (D-4th District).

== Education ==
Students in grades K–6 go to the Memorial School. Hopedale Junior Senior High School is for grades 7–12. Hopedale's public schools consistently rank among the top 5% of high schools within the United States, and its high school was ranked 54 out of 650 public high schools in Massachusetts in 2020.

Following the Great Recession, Hopedale explored the possibility of joining Nipmuc Regional High School, however strong community dissent and concerns over a lack of educational benefit led to a rejection of the proposal in late 2010.

== Notable people ==
- Adin Ballou, noted 19th-century pacifist, socialist, and abolitionist
- Dick Bresciani, Boston Red Sox executive
- Brendan Burke, soccer player and coach
- Eben Sumner Draper, 44th Governor of Massachusetts
- Eben S. Draper Jr., Massachusetts state representative
- Wickliffe Draper, political activist, founder of the Pioneer Fund
- Dana Gould, comedian
- Kevin Nee, professional strongman athlete
- Joe Perry, lead guitarist Aerosmith

== See also ==
- Bancroft Memorial Library
- Hopedale Industrial Park Airport
- Hopedale Junior Senior High School
- List of mill towns in Massachusetts
