= Hopedale (CDP), Massachusetts =

Hopedale, Massachusetts
- Census-designated place
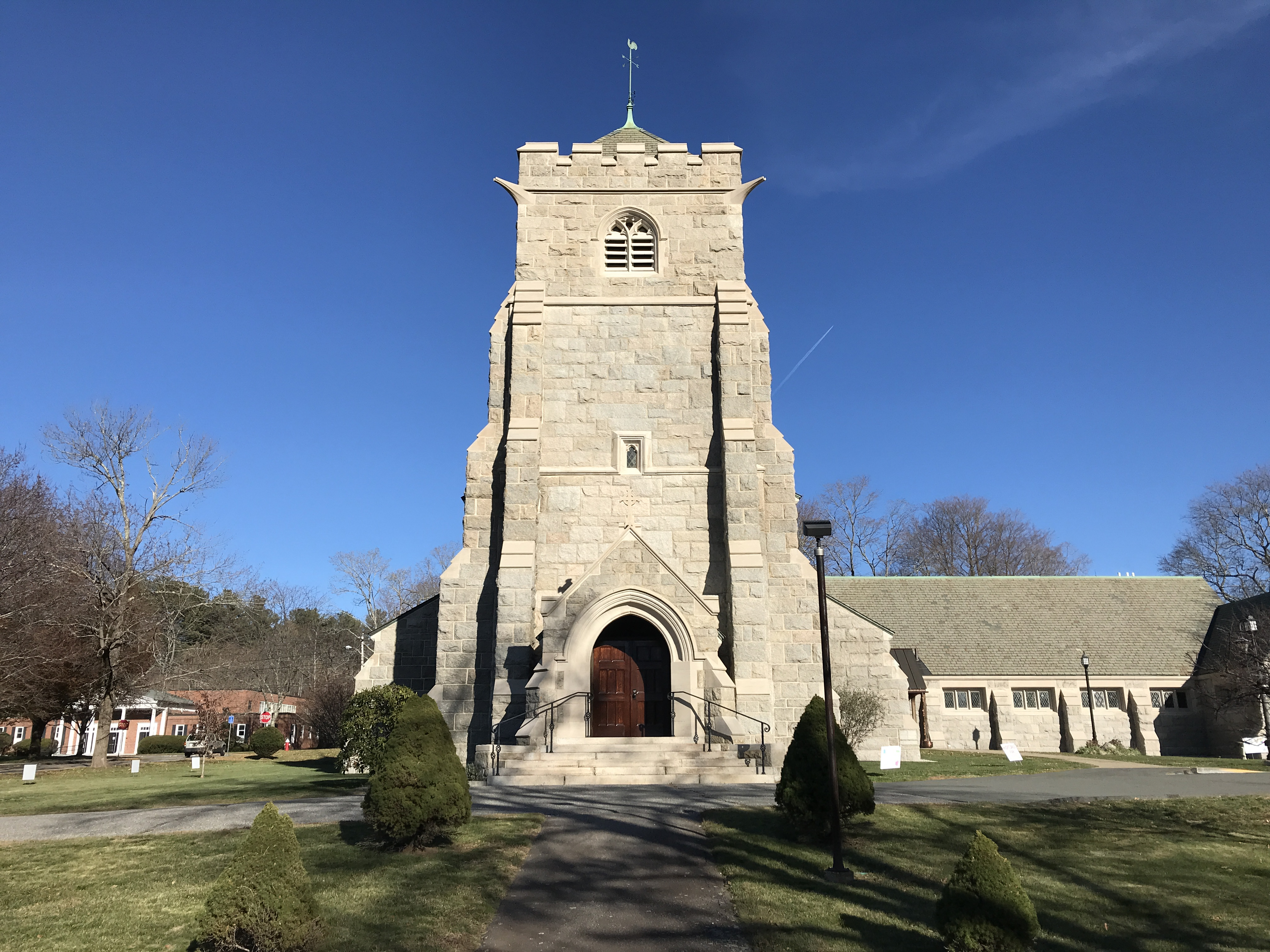
- Hopedale Unitarian Parish

- Location within Massachusetts Location within the United States
- Coordinates: 42°7′48″N 71°32′22″W
- Country: United States
- State: Massachusetts
- County: Worcester
- Town: Hopedale

Area
  - Total: 1.75 sq mi (4.54 km^{2})
  - Land: 1.75 sq mi (4.53 km^{2})
  - Water: 0.0039 sq mi (0.01 km^{2})
- Elevation: 284 ft (86.7 m)

Population (2020)
  - Total: 3,939
  - Density: 2,252.9/sq mi (869.85/km^{2})
- Time zone: UTC-5 (Eastern (EST))
  - Summer (DST): UTC-4 (EDT)
- ZIP Code: 01747
- Area codes: 508/774
- FIPS code: 25-30980
- GNIS feature ID: 2378143

Hopedale is a census-designated place (CDP) comprising the main village in the town of Hopedale, Worcester County, Massachusetts, United States. As of the 2010 census, it had a population of 3,753, out of 5,911 in the entire town of Hopedale.

Hopedale is bordered to the northeast by the town of Milford and to the southwest by the town of Mendon. It is 33 miles (53 km) southwest of Boston and 18 miles (29 km) southeast of Worcester, and 25 miles (40 km) north of Providence, Rhode Island. Massachusetts Route 16 passes through the community, leading northeast 1.5 miles (2.4 km) to the center of Milford and southwest 6 miles (10 km) to Uxbridge.

== Demographics ==
Historical population
Census	Pop.	Note	%±
2020	3,939		—
U.S. Decennial Census
