= Paul Dean (minister) =

American Universalist minister

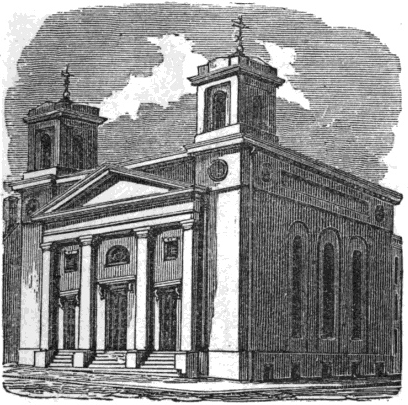
Central Universalist Church, Bulfinch Street, Beacon Hill, Boston; built 1823. Dean served as pastor 1823-1840

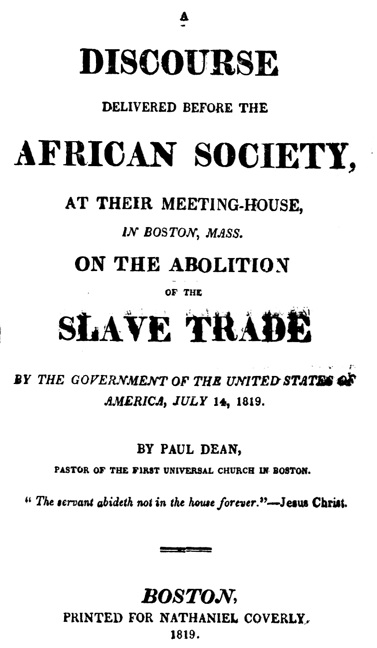
Title page of Dean's A discourse delivered before the African Society, at their meeting-house, in Boston, Mass. on the abolition of the slave trade by the government of the United States of America, July 14, 1819

Paul Dean (1789–1860) was an American 19th-century Universalist minister. He was a pastor in Boston, Massachusetts, of the First Universalist Church on Hanover Street (c. 1813) and the Central Universalist Church on Bulfinch Street (1823–1840).

== Works ==
- A sermon preached before the Ancient and Honourable Artillery Company on the 177th anniversary of their election of officers Boston, June 3, 1816.
- A eulogy delivered in Boylston Hall, Boston at the request of the Masonic, Handel and Haydn, and Philharmonic Societies, August 19, 1819, on the character of their late friend and brother Thomas Smith Webb, Esq.
- A discourse delivered before the African Society, at their meeting-house, in Boston, Mass. on the abolition of the slave trade by the government of the United States of America, July 14, 1819. Boston: Nathaniel Coverly, 1819.
- A sermon, delivered at the installation of the Rev. Hosea Ballou, 2d: to the pastoral care and charge of the First Universalist Society, in Roxbury, July 26, 1821.
- 120 Reasons for Being a Universalist. 1827.
- A discourse delivered at the annual election, January 4, 1832, before His Excellency Levi Lincoln, governor, His Honor Thomas L. Winthrop, lieutenant governor, the honorable Council, and the legislature of Massachusetts.
- A course of lectures in defence of the final restoration: delivered in the Bulfinch street church, Boston, in the winter of 1832.
