= Adin Ballou =

American minister (1803–1890)

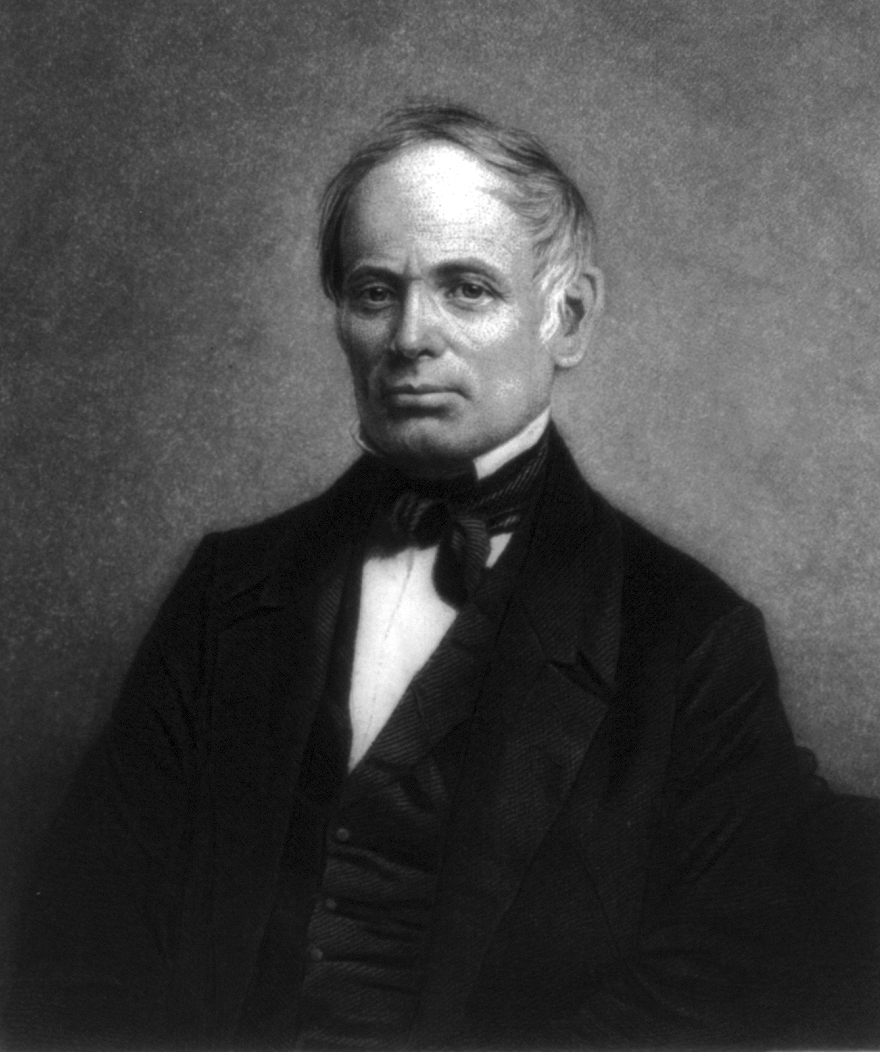
- Adin Ballou
- Born: April 23, 1803; Cumberland, Rhode Island, U.S.
- Died: August 5, 1890 (aged 87)
- Known for: Christian nonresistance; Christian anarchism; Christian socialism; Christian abolitionism
- Spouse: Abigail Sayles (m. 1822; died 1829) Lucy Hunter (after 1829)
- Children: Abbie Ballou Heywood

Adin Ballou (April 23, 1803 – August 5, 1890) was an American proponent of Christian nonresistance, Christian anarchism, and Christian socialism. He was also an abolitionist and the founder of the Hopedale Community. As well, he was a Christian universalist, specifically a Christian universal restorationist, believing in both universal salvation and the existence of punishment in the afterlife. He was also a co-founder of the Massachusetts Association of Universal Restorationists.

Through his long career as a Universalist and Unitarian minister, he advocated for the immediate abolition of slavery and the principles of Christian anarcho-socialism, and promoted the nonviolent theory of praxis (or moral suasion) in his writings.

== Life and works ==
Ballou was born on a small farm in Cumberland, Rhode Island. Ballou's father was a farmer, and while Ballou craved a school and college education, his father lacked the means to send him. At the time of the Christian 'reformation' sweeping through northern Rhode Island, his father became a deacon within the community.

In early 1822 Adin Ballou married Abigail Sayles. Abigail Ballou died in early 1829, soon after the birth of a daughter, Abbie Ballou Heywood. Of Ballou's four children, only Abbie Ballou lived to adulthood. After his first wife Abigail had died, Ballou became very unwell. Lucy Hunt nursed him back to health, and after his sickness had passed, Hunt and Ballou married and remained married for the rest of his life.

Ballou became an advocate of Christian pacifism by 1838. "Standard of Practical Christianity" was composed in 1839 by Ballou and a few ministerial colleagues and laymen. The signatories announced their withdrawal from "the governments of the world." They believed the dependence on force to maintain order was unjust and vowed to not participate in such government. While they did not acknowledge the earthly rule of man, they also did not rebel or "resist any of their ordinances by physical force." "We cannot employ carnal weapons nor any physical violence whatsoever," they proclaimed, "not even for the preservation of our lives. We cannot render evil for evil... nor do otherwise than 'love our enemies.'"

In 1843, he began to serve as president of the New England Non-Resistance Society, and in 1846 he wrote his primary work on non-resistance, titled "Christian Non-Resistance".

Ballou was a prominent local historian for Milford and wrote one of the earliest complete histories of the town in 1882, "History of the town of Milford, Worcester county, Massachusetts, from its first settlement to 1881". Ballou also wrote a 1323-page genealogy on the descendants of his immigrant ancestor Mathurin Ballou of Providence, Island, "An Elaborate History and Genealogy of the Ballous in America".

Hopedale, Massachusetts remains true to what Ballou stood for, in keeping of the street names - “Peace,” “Hope,” “Freedom,” and “Union.” A statue of Ballou is located in Adin Ballou Park in Hopedale, Massachusetts. The park also contains a small weathered front doorstep and a boot-scraper, the only surviving remains of the original farmhouse the first Hopedale Settlers built.

== Bibliography ==
- Non-Resistance in Relation to Human Governments (1839)
- Non-Resistant Cathechism (1844)
- Christian Non-Resistance (1846)
- Practical Christian Socialism (1854)
- Primitive Christianity and it's Corruptions (3 Volumes) (1870-1899)

== Influence ==
Ballou's writings drew the admiration of Leo Tolstoy, who frequently cited Ballou as a major influence on his theological and political ideology in nonfiction books like The Kingdom of God is Within You. Tolstoy also sponsored Russian translations of some of Ballou's works.

Ballou's Christian anarchist and nonresistance ideals in texts like Practical Christianity were passed down from Tolstoy to Mahatma Gandhi, contributing not only to the nonviolent resistance movement in the Russian Revolution led by the Tolstoyans but also Gandhi's early thinkings on the nonviolent theory of praxis and the development of his first ashram, the Tolstoy Farm.

In a recent publication, the American philosopher and anarchist Crispin Sartwell wrote that the works by Ballou and his other Christian anarchist contemporaries like William Lloyd Garrison directly influenced Gandhi and Martin Luther King Jr.

== See also ==
- Nonresistance
- Nonviolence
- Peace churches
- Pacifism
- The Kingdom of God is Within You
