= George T. Knight (Universalist) =

American universalist teacher

George Thompson Knight (October 29, 1850 – 1911) was an American Universalist teacher at the Crane Theological School, a Universalist seminary at Tufts University.

Knight's father was an abolitionist and Universalist. Knight graduated from divinity school in 1875 and was appointed Instructor in Rhetoric and Church History where he taught Biblical history and Greek. By the end of his career he had taught "almost every subject offered" at Tufts Divinity School. He was made Secretary of the Faculty of the Divinity School in 1884, and was one of the first local members of Phi Beta Kappa.

== Works ==
- Article on Universalists in the Schaff-Herzog Encyclopedia of Religious Knowledge (See: Universalist Church of America)
