= Hopedale Community =

Planned community in Milford, Massachusetts

The Hopedale Community was founded in Milford, Massachusetts, in 1843 by Adin Ballou. He and his followers purchased 600 acres (2.4 km^{2}) of land on which they built homes for the community members, chapels and the factories for which the company was initially formed. The area was later split from Milford and became the town of Hopedale, Massachusetts.

Ballou believed that he could create a utopian community blending the features of a factory town with those of a religion-based commune. He called this "Practical Christianity" but unlike several similar communities, it was important to Ballou that Hopedale would not be isolated from the rest of society. The community stood for temperance, abolitionism, women's rights, spiritualism, and education. Fourteen years after the land was purchased, Hopedale went bankrupt. The intentional community was converted into a textile factory town. The factories were purchased by George and Ebenezer Draper, later of the Draper Corporation.

== Joint Stock Community ==
Each person, upon joining the Community, invested their property into the Community. Each year they were credited according to this amount. If a person were to leave the Community, they were given either their initial investment or ninety percent of that which was credited to them.

== Gender equality ==
The Hopedale Community, or Fraternal Community No. 1, made many attempts to create equality among all members. Though Ballou stated that men and women were equal members of the society, he commented that male and female roles were set by their creator. This meant that within the community, men and women were allowed to take part in democratic processes, but women were, for the most part, given domestically oriented jobs while the men were the governmental leaders. There was even a special sector of the "Hopedale Industrial Army" that doubled as a traditional sewing circle for women to socialize while working. However, there were several women who took on roles in the government and promotion of the community. According to Edward K. Spann's book, Hopedale: From Commune to Company Town, 1840–1920, Abby H. Price, an elected official of the Hopedale community, acted as a spokeswoman for equal rights and work compensation.

== Community beliefs ==
Hopedale Community was founded upon Ballou's Universalist beliefs about Christianity. He believed that Jesus Christ had made it possible for people to live a good life on Earth and so this community was instituted to be an example of this life. The Christian lifestyle at Hopedale was more concerned with equality, love and sharing than it was about the dogmas of religion. In his book, Practical Christian Socialism, Ballou outlines the principles of theology, righteousness and social order.

I. Principles of Theological Truth
1. The existence of one All-Perfect Infinite God.
2. The mediatorial manifestation of God through Christ.
3. Divine revelations and inspirations given to men.
4. The immortal existence of human and angelic spirits.
5. The moral agency and religious obligation of mankind.
6. The certainty of a perfect divine retribution.
7. The necessity of man's spiritual regeneration.
8. The final universal triumph of good over evil.

II. Principles of Personal Righteousness.
1. Reverence for the Divine and spiritual.
2. Self-denial for righteousness' sake.
3. Justice to all beings.
4. Truth in all manifestations of mind.
5. Love in all spiritual relations.
6. Purity in all things.
7. Patience in all right aims and pursuits.
8. Unceasing progress towards perfection.

III. Principles of Social Order
1. The supreme Fatherhood of God.
2. The universal Brotherhood of Man.
3. The declared perfect love of God to Man.
4. The required perfect love of Man to God.
5. The required perfect love of Man to Man.
6. The required just reproof and disfellowship of evildoers.
7. The required non-resistance of evildoers with evil.
8. The designed unity of the righteous.
