= Christian mortalism =

Christian belief that the human soul is not naturally immortal

Christian mortalism is the Christian belief that the human soul is not naturally immortal, and may include the belief that the soul is "sleeping" after death until the Resurrection of the Dead and the Last Judgment, a time known as the intermediate state. "Soul sleep" is often used as a pejorative term, (Note: The term is also common in the works of the Trinitarian Christian countercult movement.) so the more neutral term "mortalism" was also used in the nineteenth century, and "Christian mortalism" since the 1970s. Historically the term psychopannychism was also used, despite problems with the etymology (Note: Pannychis (παννυχὶς) in Greek means an all night party.) (Note: The term pannychis is used correctly in the classical Greek sense in Calvin's original Latin publication Psychopannychia.) and application. The opposite term thnetopsychism has also been used; for example, Gordon Campbell (2008) identified John Milton as believing in the latter.

Christian mortalism stands in contrast with the traditional Christian belief that the souls of the dead immediately go to heaven, or hell, or (in Catholicism) purgatory. Christian mortalism has been taught by several theologians and church organizations throughout history, while also facing opposition from aspects of Christian organized religion. The Catholic Church condemned such thinking in the Fifth Council of the Lateran as "erroneous assertions". Supporters include eighteenth-century religious figure Henry Layton, among many others.

== Etymology and terminology ==
Since the phrases "soul sleep" or "soul death" do not occur either in the Bible or in early Patristic materials, an explanation is required for the origin of the term. Additionally, several other terms have been introduced which relate to the view. Modern theologians have used the term "Christian mortalism" and related wordings from the 21st century onwards.

This term does not literally describe a sleep in the physiological sense, but rather a state of inactivity and the absence of active consciousness. The doctrine maintains the continuation and subsistence of a spiritual element after death (Eccl. 12:7; Ps. 104:29; Ps. 146:4; Acts 7:59), which is endowed with personal characteristics and memories, so that the “I” of the person continues to exist, even though in the interim it lacks its full physicality and rests. Accordingly, the deceased have no perception of the passage of time and no connection to the living until they are “awakened” on the day of the Last Judgment by the power of God and united with the (restored) body (Apostles’ Creed, resurrection of the flesh, Latin carnis resurrectionem).

=== Soul sleep ===
The phrase soul sleep appears to have been popularized by John Calvin in the subtitle to his Latin tract Psychopannychia (Psychopannychia (manuscript), Orléans, 1534, Psychopannychia (print) (in Latin), Strasbourg, 1542, Psychopannychia (in French) (2nd ed.), Geneva, 1558 [1545], Psychopannychia, 1581). The title of the booklet comes from Greek psyche (soul, mind) with pan-nychis (παν-νυχίς, all-night vigil, all-night banquet), so Psychopannychia, originally, represents Calvin's view that the soul was conscious and active after death.

The title and subtitle of the 1542 Strasbourg 1st edition read: Vivere apud Christum non-dormire animas sanctas qui in fide Christi decedunt. Assertio. [That the holy souls of those who die in the faith of Christ live with Christ and do not sleep. An Assertion.] (in Latin).

The title and subtitle of the 1545 2nd Latin edition read: Psychopannychia – qua repellitur quorundam imperitorum error qui animas post mortem usque ad ultimum iudicium dormire putant. [Psychopannychia – Or a refutation of the error entertained by some unskillful persons, who ignorantly imagine that in the interval between death and the judgment the soul sleeps.] (in Latin).

The 1558 French edition was a translation of that of the 1545 2nd edition: Psychopannychie – traitté par lequel est prouvé que les âmes veillent et vivent après qu'elles sont sorties des corps; contre l'erreur de quelques ignorans qui pensent qu'elles dorment jusque au dernier jugement.

=== Other terms ===
- "Psychopannychism" – In the Latin it is clearer that Psychopannychia is actually the refutation of, the opposite of, the idea of soul sleep. The version Psychopannychie – La nuit ou le sommeil de l'âme [Psychopannychia – the night or the sleep of the soul] (in French), Geneva, 1558 may have caused the confusion that by -pannychis Calvin meant sleep (in Greek -hypnos, sleep, not -pannychis, vigil). The subtitle le sommeil de l'âme (in French) was taken up as Seelenschlaf [Soul-sleep] (in German). The tract first appeared in English as An excellent treatise of the Immortalytie of the Soule, translated by Stocker, T., London, 1581.

Luther's use of similar language (but this time defending the view) appears in print only a few years after Calvin:

…so the soul after death enters its chamber and peace, and sleeping does not feel its sleep

— Enarrationes in Genesis [Commentary on Genesis] (in Latin), 1535–1545.

- "Hypnopsychism" – from hypno- + psyche ("sleep of soul") was a more correct coinage from Greek than that of Calvin's editor. Eustratios of Constantinople (after 582) denounced mortalism as a heresy using this term.
- "Thnetopsychism" – A contrasting phrase is thnetopsychism (from Greek thnetos [mortal] + psyche [soul, mind]). The term has its origin in the descriptions of Eusebius of Caesarea and John of Damascus of mortalist views among Arab Christians, In the 1600s also this phrase was applied also to the views of Tyndale, Luther and other mortalists, from awareness that Calvin's term Psychopannychia originally described his own belief, not the belief he was calling error. The term is also used of the view of the Anabaptists. Their view is that the soul dies, with the body to be recalled to life at the resurrection of the dead, or that the soul is not separate from the body and so there is no "spiritual" self to survive bodily death. In both cases, the deceased does not begin to enjoy a reward or suffer a punishment until Judgment Day.

== Mortalist arguments ==
Historically, Christian mortalists have advanced theological, lexical, and scientific arguments in support of their position.

=== Theological arguments ===
Theological arguments that contended that the continued existence of the soul was not taught in the Bible were made by mortalists such as Francis Blackburne, Joseph Priestley, and Samuel Bourne. Mortalists such as Richard Overton advanced a combination of theological and philosophical arguments in favor of soul sleep. Thomas Hobbes likewise made extensive use of theological argumentation. Some mortalists viewed their beliefs as a return to original Christian teaching. Mortalists’ theological arguments were also used to contest the Catholic doctrine of purgatory and masses for the dead.

The 2000 British Evangelical Alliance ACUTE report states the doctrine of soul sleep is a "significant minority evangelical view" that has "grown within evangelicalism in recent years". Although in modern times some have attempted to introduce the concept of soul sleep into Eastern Orthodox thought about life after death, it has never been a part of traditional Eastern Orthodox teaching, and it even contradicts the Eastern Orthodox understanding of the intercession of the Saints.

Mortalists argue for soul sleep using Bible verses such as Psalm 6:5, 115:17, 146:4, Ecclesiastes 9:5, Luke 8:52-53, John 11:11–14, 1 Corinthians 15:51-54, and 1 Thessalonians 4:16-17. Mortalists point to Genesis 2 and Revelation 22, where the Tree of Life is mentioned. It is argued that these passages, along with Genesis 3:22–24 teach that human beings will naturally die without continued access to God's life-giving power.

As a general rule, soul sleep goes hand in hand with annihilationism, that is, the belief that the souls of the wicked will be completely destroyed. The two ideas are not exactly equivalent, however, because in principle God may annihilate a soul that was previously created immortal. While annihilationism places emphasis on the active destruction of a person, soul sleep places emphasis on a person's dependence upon God for life; the extinction of the person is thus a passive consequence of separation from God, much like natural death is a consequence of prolonged separation from food, water, and air.

Mortalist writers, such as Thomas Hobbes in Leviathan, have often argued that the doctrine of natural (or innate) immortality stems not from Hebrew thought as presented in the Bible, but rather from pagan influence, particularly Greek philosophy and the teachings of Plato, or Christian tradition. Bishop of Durham N.T. Wright noted that 1 Timothy 6:15-16 teaches "God… alone is immortal," while in 2 Timothy 1:10 it says that immortality only comes to human beings as a gift through the gospel. Immortality is something to be sought after (Romans 2:7) therefore it is not inherent to all humanity.

These groups may claim that the doctrine of soul sleep reconciles two seemingly conflicting traditions in the Bible: the ancient Hebrew concept that the human being is mortal with no meaningful existence after death (see שאול, Sheol and the Book of Ecclesiastes), and the later Jewish and Christian belief in the resurrection of the dead and personal immortality after Judgment Day.

=== Lexical arguments ===
In the late eighteenth century, the standard Hebrew lexicon and grammar of John Parkhurst expressed the view that the traditional rendering of the Hebrew word nephesh as reference to an immortal soul had no lexical support. Mortalists in the nineteenth century used lexical arguments to deny the traditional doctrines of hell and the immortal soul.

=== Scientific arguments ===
The eighteenth-century mortalist Henry Layton presented arguments based on physiology. Scientific arguments became important to the nineteenth-century discussion of soul sleep and natural immortality, and mortalist Miles Grant cited extensively from a number of scientists who observed that the immortality of the soul was unsupported by scientific evidence.

== Historical proponents of the mortality of the soul ==
The mortality of the soul has had a number of advocates throughout the history of both Judaism and Christianity.

=== Judaism ===
Modern scholars believe the concept of an immortal soul going to bliss or torment after death entered mainstream Judaism after the Babylonian exile and existed throughout the Second Temple period, though both 'soul sleep' and 'soul death', were also held.

Soul sleep is present in certain Second Temple period pseudepigraphal works, later rabbinical works, and among medieval era rabbis such as Abraham Ibn Ezra (1092–1167), Maimonides (1135–1204), and Joseph Albo (1380–1444).

Some authorities within Conservative Judaism, notably Neil Gillman, also support the notion that the souls of the dead are unconscious until the resurrection.

Traditional rabbinic Judaism, however, has always been of the opinion that belief in immortality of at least most souls, and punishment and reward after death, was a consistent belief back through the giving of the Torah at Mount Sinai. Traditional Judaism reads the Torah accordingly. As an example, the punishment of kareth (excision) is understood to mean that the soul is cut off from God in the afterlife.

=== Christian views ===
==== Second century ====
In the second half of the second century, Tatian wrote: "The soul is not in itself immortal... If, indeed, it knows not the truth, it dies, and is dissolved with the body, but rises again at last at the end of the world with the body, receiving death by punishment in immortality. But, again, if it acquires the knowledge of God, it dies not, although for a time it be dissolved." Tatian's contemporary Athenagoras of Athens taught that souls sleep dreamlessly between death and resurrection: "[T]hose who are dead and those who sleep are subject to similar states, as regards at least the stillness and the absence of all sense of the present or the past, or rather of existence itself and their own life."

In Octavius, an account of a debate between a Pagan and a Christian by Marcus Minucius Felix, the Christian in the debate takes mortalism to be a matter of common agreement:

But who is so foolish or so brutish as to dare to deny that man, as he could first of all be formed by God, so can again be re-formed; that he is nothing after death, and that he was nothing before he began to exist; and as from nothing it was possible for him to be born, so from nothing it may be possible for him to be restored?

— Octavius, Chapter XXXIV

==== Third to seventh centuries ====
Mortalism in the early church in this period is testified by Eusebius of Caesarea:

About the same time others arose in Arabia, putting forward a doctrine foreign to the truth. They said that during the present time the human soul dies and perishes with the body, but that at the time of the resurrection they will be renewed together. And at that time also a synod of considerable size assembled, and Origen, being again invited there, spoke publicly on the question with such effect that the opinions of those who had formerly fallen were changed.

— Church History, Book VI, Chapter 37

This synod in Arabia would have been during the reign of Emperor Philip the Arab (244–249). Redepenning (1841) was of the opinion that Eusebius' terminology here, "the human soul dies" was probably that of their critics rather than the Arabian Christians' own expression and they were more likely simply "psychopannychists", believers in "soul sleep".

Some Syriac writers such as Aphrahat, Ephrem and Narsai believed in the dormition, or "sleep", of the soul, in which "...souls of the dead...are largely inert, having lapsed into a state of sleep, in which they can only dream of their future reward or punishments." John of Damascus denounced the ideas of some Arab Christians as thnetopsychism ("soul death"). Eustratios of Constantinople (after 582) denounced this and what he called hypnopsychism ("soul sleep"). The issue was connected to that of the intercession of saints. The writings of Christian ascetic Isaac of Nineveh (d. 700), reflect several perspectives which include soul sleep.

==== Ninth to fifteenth centuries ====
Soul sleep evidently persisted since various Byzantine writers had to defend the doctrine of the veneration of saints against those who said the saints sleep. John the Deacon (eleventh century) attacked those who "dare to say that praying to the saints is like shouting in the ears of the deaf, as if they had drunk from the mythical waters of Oblivion."

Pope John XXII inadvertently caused the beatific vision controversy (1331–1334) by suggesting that the saved do not attain the beatific vision, or "see God" until Judgment Day (in Italian: Visione beatifica differita, "deferred beatific vision"), which was a view possibly consistent with soul sleep. The Sacred College of Cardinals held a consistory on the problem in January 1334, and Pope John conceded to the more orthodox understanding. His successor, in that same year, Pope Benedict XII, declared that the righteous do see Heaven prior to the final judgement. In 1336, Pope Benedict XII issued the papal bull Benedictus Deus. This document defined the Church's belief that the souls of the departed go to their eternal reward immediately after death, as opposed to remaining in a state of unconscious existence until the Last Judgment.

==== The Reformation ====
Soul sleep re-emerged in Christianity when it was promoted by some Reformation leaders, and it survives today in some denominations, such as Jehovah's Witnesses and the Seventh-day Adventist Church. Conti has argued that during the Reformation both psychosomnolence (the belief that the soul sleeps until the resurrection) and thnetopsychism (the belief that the body and soul both die and then both rise again) were quite common.

Anglican cleric William Tyndale (1494–1536) argued against Thomas More in favor of soul sleep:

And ye, in putting them [the departed souls] in heaven, hell and purgatory, destroy the arguments wherewith Christ and Paul prove the resurrection... And again, if the souls be in heaven, tell me why they be not in as good a case as the angels be? And then what cause is there of the resurrection?

— William Tyndale, An Answer to Sir Thomas More's Dialogue (1530), pp. 119–120

Morey suggests that John Wycliffe (1320–1384) and Tyndale taught the doctrine of soul sleep "as the answer to the Catholic teachings of purgatory and masses for the dead."

Some Anabaptists in this period, such as Michael Sattler (1490–1527), were Christian mortalists.

Martin Luther (1483–1546) is said to have advocated soul sleep, though certain scholars, such as Trevor O’Reggio, argue that his writings reflect a nuanced position on the subject. In writing on Ecclesiastes, Luther says:

Salomon judgeth that the dead are a sleepe, and feele nothing at all. For the dead lye there accompting neyther dayes nor yeares, but when they are awoken, they shall seeme to have slept scarce one minute.

— Martin Luther, An Exposition of Salomon's Booke, called Ecclesiastes or the Preacher (1573)

Elsewhere Luther states that:

As soon as thy eyes have closed shalt thou be woken, a thousand years shall be as if thou hadst slept but a little half-hour. Just as at night we hear the clock strike and know not how long we have slept, so too, and how much more, are in death a thousand years soon past. Before a man should turn round, he is already a fair angel.

— Martin Luther

Jürgen Moltmann (2000) concludes from this that "Luther conceived the state of the dead as a deep, dreamless sleep, removed from time and space, without consciousness and without feeling." That Luther believed in soul sleep is also the view of Michael R. Watts. Some writers have claimed that Luther changed his view later in life. Gottfried Fritschel (1867) claims that quotations from Luther's Latin works had been misread in Latin or in German translation to contradict or qualify specific statements and what he perceived as Luther's overall teaching, namely that the sleep of the dead was unconscious. These readings can still be found in some English sources.

Several passages, including the following examples, show that Luther's views are more nuanced, or are even cited to show that he adhered to the doctrine of the immortality of the soul:

It is true that souls hear, perceive, and see after death; but how it is done, we do not understand… If we undertake to give an account of such things after the manner of this life, then we are fools. Christ has given a good answer; for his disciples were without doubt just as curious. ‘He that believeth in me, though he were dead, yet shall he live,’ (John xi.25); likewise: ‘Whether we live, or whether we die, we are the Lord’s,’ (Rom. Xiv.8)… ‘The soul of Abraham lives with God, his body lies here dead,’ it would be a distinction which to my mind is mere rot! I will dispute it. One must say: ‘The whole Abraham, the entire man, lives!

A man tired with his daily labour... sleeps. But his soul does not sleep (Anima autem non-sic dormit) but is awake (sed vigilat). It experiences visions and the discourses of the angels and of God. Therefore, the sleep in the future life is deeper than it is in this life. Nevertheless, the soul lives to God. This is the likeness to the sleep of life."

I think the same about the condemned souls; some may feel punishments immediately after death, but others may be spared from [punishments] until that Day [of Judgment]. For the reveler [in that parable] confesses that he is tortured; and the Psalm says, “Evil will catch up with the unjust man when he perishes.” You perhaps also refer this either to the Day of Judgment or to the passing anguish of physical death. Then my opinion would be that this is uncertain. It is most probable, however, that with few exceptions, all [departed souls] sleep without possessing any capacity of feeling. Consider now who the “spirits in prison” were to whom Christ preached, as Peter writes: Could they not also sleep until the Day [of Judgment]? Yet when Jude says concerning the Sodomites that they suffer the pain of eternal fire, he is speaking of a present [fire].

As such, Lutheran churches in the Missouri Synod affirm that "The Confessions rule out the contemporary view that death is a pleasant and painless transition into a perfect world" and reject both the ideas that "the soul is by nature and by virtue of an inherent quality immortal" and that "the soul 'sleeps' between death and the resurrection in such a way that it is not conscious of bliss".

On the other hand, others believing in soul sleep included Camillo Renato (1540), Mátyás Dévai Bíró (1500–45), Michael Servetus (1511–1553), Laelio Sozzini (1562), Fausto Sozzini (1563), the Polish Brethren (1565 onwards), Dirk Philips (1504–1568), Gregory Paul of Brzeziny (1568), the Socinians (1570–1800), John Frith (1573), George Schomann (1574) and Simon Budny (1576).

==== Seventeenth to eighteenth centuries ====
Soul sleep was a significant minority view from the eighth to the seventeenth centuries, and it became increasingly common from the Reformation onwards.

Soul sleep has been called a "major current of seventeenth century protestant ideology." John Milton wrote in his unpublished De Doctrina Christiana,

Inasmuch then as the whole man is uniformly said to consist of body, and soul (whatever may be the distinct provinces assigned to these divisions), I will show, that in death, first, the whole man, and secondly, each component part, suffers privation of life.

— Milton, page 280

Gordon Campbell (2008) identifies Milton's views as "thnetopsychism", a belief that the soul dies with the body but is resurrected at the last judgment. however Milton speaks also of the dead as "asleep".

Those holding this view include: 1600s: Sussex Baptists d. 1612: Edward Wightman 1627: Samuel Gardner 1628: Samuel Przypkowski 1636: George Wither 1637: Joachim Stegmann 1624: Richard Overton 1654: John Biddle (Unitarian) 1655: Matthew Caffyn 1658: Samuel Richardson 1608–1674: John Milton 1588–1670: Thomas Hobbes 1605–1682: Thomas Browne 1622–1705: Henry Layton 1702: William Coward 1632–1704: John Locke 1643–1727: Isaac Newton 1676–1748: Pietro Giannone 1751: William Kenrick 1755: Edmund Law 1759: Samuel Bourn 1723–1791: Richard Price 1718–1797: Peter Peckard 1733–1804: Joseph Priestley Francis Blackburne (1765).

==== Nineteenth to twentieth centuries ====
Belief in soul sleep and the annihilation of the unsaved became increasingly common during the nineteenth century, entering mainstream Christianity in the twentieth century. From this point it is possible to speak in terms of entire groups holding the belief, and only the most prominent individual nineteenth-century advocates of the doctrine will be mentioned here.

Others include: Millerites (from 1833), (Note: The original group following the teachings of William Miller, who began preaching his distinctive beliefs in 1833; Miller himself did not believe in conditional immortality, but it was one of a number of beliefs held among the group.) Edward White (1846), Christadelphians (from 1848), Thomas Thayer (1855), François Gaussen (d. 1863), Henry Constable (1873), Louis Burnier (Waldensian, d. 1878), the Baptist Conditionalist Association (1878), Cameron Mann (1888), Emmanuel Pétavel-Olliff (1891), Miles Grant (1895), George Gabriel Stokes (1897).

=== Modern Christian groups ===
Present-day defenders of soul sleep include Nicky Gumbel, Primitive Baptist Universalists, some Lutherans, the Seventh-day Adventist Church, Advent Christian Church, the Afterlife group, Christadelphians, the Church of God (Seventh Day), Church of God (7th day) – Salem Conference, the Church of God Abrahamic Faith, and various other Church of God organizations and related denominations which adhered to the older teachings of Herbert W. Armstrong's Worldwide Church of God, and the Bible Student movement.

Jehovah's Witnesses teach a form of thnetopsychism, in that the soul is the body (Genesis 2:7) and that it dies (Ezekiel 18:20; Ecclesiastes 9:5,10). They believe that 144,000 chosen ones will receive immortality in heaven to rule as kings and priests with Christ in Heaven (Rev 7:4; 14:1,3) but all the other saved will be raised from the dead on the last day (John 5:28,29) to receive eternal life on a Paradise Earth (Revelation 7:9,14,17).

Seventh-day Adventists believe that death is a state of unconscious sleep until the resurrection. They base this belief on biblical texts such as Ecclesiastes 9:5 which states "the dead know nothing", and 1 Thessalonians 4:13–18 which contains a description of the dead being raised from the grave at the second coming. These verses, it is argued, indicate that death is only a period or form of slumber.

Adventists also use a number of texts to defend this position. They use verses like Rom. 6:23, John 20:17, John 5:28, 29, Isa. 25:8, Job 19:25-27, to defend conditional immortality, stating:

The wages of sin is death. But God, who alone is immortal, will grant eternal life to His redeemed. Until that day death is an unconscious state for all people. When Christ, who is our life, appears, the resurrected righteous and the living righteous will be glorified and caught up to meet their Lord. The second resurrection, the resurrection of the unrighteous, will take place a thousand years later.

On John 11, they also comment:

Although colloquially called “soul sleep, the official term in Adventist belief number 26 (Death and Resurrection) regarding the state of the dead is an “unconscious state.” Examples of it can be found throughout the Bible. For example, when looking at the story of Lazarus rising from the dead (John 11, NKJV), would it not be cruel to interrupt Lazarus’s perfect state in heaven by bringing him back to life to return to this corrupt earth, only to die again later?

== Critics/opponents ==
=== Immortality of the soul ===
The orthodox Christian belief about the intermediate state between death and the Last Judgment is immortality of the soul followed immediately after death of the body by particular judgment. In Catholicism some souls temporarily stay in Purgatory to be purified for Heaven (as described in the Catechism of the Catholic Church, 1030–1032). Eastern Orthodoxy, Methodism, Anglicanism, and Mormonism use different terminology, but generally teach that the soul waits in the Abode of the Dead, specifically Hades or the Spirit World, until the resurrection of the dead, the saved resting in light and the damned suffering in darkness. According to James Tabor this Eastern Orthodox picture of particular judgment is similar to the first-century Jewish and possibly Early Christian concept that the dead either "rest in peace" in the Bosom of Abraham (mentioned in the Gospel of Luke) or suffer in Hades. This view was also promoted by John Calvin, although Calvin taught that immortality was not in the nature of the soul but was imparted by God. Nineteenth-century Reformed theologians such as A. A. Hodge, W. G. T. Shedd, and Louis Berkhof also taught the immortality of the soul, but some later Reformed theologians such as Herman Bavinck and G. C. Berkouwer rejected the idea as unscriptural.

Opponents of psychopannychism (soul sleeping) and thnetopsychism (the temporary death of the soul) include the Roman Catholic Church and Eastern Orthodox Church (that also teach about Intercession of saints, connected to this subject), most mainline Protestant denominations, and most conservative Protestants, Evangelicals, and Fundamentalists.

=== Roman Catholic Church ===
The Roman Catholic Church has called soul sleep a serious heresy:

And since truth cannot contradict truth, we define that every statement contrary to the enlightened truth of the faith is totally false and we strictly forbid teaching otherwise to be permitted. We decree that all those who cling to erroneous statements of this kind, thus sowing heresies which are wholly condemned, should be avoided in every way and punished as detestable and odious heretics and infidels who are undermining the catholic faith. Moreover we strictly enjoin on each and every philosopher who teaches publicly in the universities or elsewhere, that when they explain or address to their audience the principles or conclusions of philosophers, where these are known to deviate from the true faith — as in the assertion of the soul’s mortality or of there being only one soul or of the eternity of the world and other topics of this kind — they are obliged to devote their every effort to clarify for their listeners the truth of the christian religion, to teach it by convincing arguments, so far as this is possible, and to apply themselves to the full extent of their energies to refuting and disposing of the philosophers’ opposing arguments, since all the solutions are available.

— Fifth Council of the Lateran, Session 8, [Condemnation of every proposition contrary to the truth of the enlightened christian faith] (19 December 1513)

=== The Church of Jesus Christ of Latter-day Saints ===
The idea that the spirit continues as a conscious, active, and independent agent after mortal death is an important teaching of the Church of Jesus Christ of Latter-day Saints (LDS). Concerning the post-death, pre-judgment place of human spirits, LDS scripture states that "the spirits of all men, whether they be good or evil, are taken home to that God who gave them life" (Alma 40:11). They are then assigned to a state of paradise or hell (called Spirit Prison) in the spirit world depending on their faith in Christ and the manner of their mortal life (Alma 40:12–14). The Spirits remain in these states until the final judgment, when they are either received into a state of glory in the Kingdom of God, or they are cast off into Outer Darkness.

Latter-Day Saint doctrine teaches that the souls in Prison who ended up there due to ignorance or inability to accept Christ may be preached to while in Prison so that they may accept Christ. This is derived from the LDS interpretation of 1 Peter 3:18–20 where Christ is described as preaching to the "dead who were in prison" and 1 Peter 4:5–6, which states:

5 Who shall give account to him that is ready to judge the quick and the dead. 6 For this cause was the gospel preached also to them that are dead, that they might be judged according to men in the flesh, but live according to God in the spirit.

Like many Eastern Orthodox and Catholics, the LDS Church teaches that the prayers of the righteous living may be of help to the dead, but the LDS Church takes this one step further with vicarious sacraments (called "ordinances" but with a sacramental theological meaning). The LDS Church preaches the necessity of baptism by water and the Holy Ghost (Baptism and Confirmation) for salvation. They teach that previously ignorant spirits who accept Christ in Spirit Prison may receive saving ordinances through vicarious Baptism and Confirmation of the living. This is drawn from 1st Corinthians 15, wherein the Apostle Paul is arguing against a group of Christians who are mistakenly denying the physical resurrection of the dead. Paul asks them in 1st Corinthians 15:29:

29 Else what shall they do which are baptized for the dead, if the dead rise not at all? why are they then baptized for the dead?

The LDS Church believes that this is a reference to vicarious work for the dead which was practiced by the ancient Christian Church and considered orthodox in Early Christianity, including by the Apostle Paul, hence his use of it as an example of the correct doctrine of the resurrection. This is the origin of the LDS practice of baptism for the dead. As such, a great deal of LDS doctrine and practice is tied to the idea of the continued existence and activity of the human spirit after death and before judgment.

== Modern scholarship ==
As early as 1917 Harvey W. Scott wrote "That there is no definite affirmation, in the Old Testament of the doctrine of a future life, or personal immortality, is the general consensus of Biblical scholarship." The scholarly consensus of the 20th century held that the canonical teaching of the Old Testament made no reference to an immortal soul independent of the body in at least its earlier periods. This view is represented consistently in a wide range of scholarly reference works. In recent times, a minority of scholars have partially dissented from this view. According to Stephen Cook, scholars "now hotly debate the older, commonplace position that the idea of a soul, separable from the body, played little or no role in preexilic Israel" and that "recent approaches to Israelite religion that are increasingly informed by archaeological artifacts are defending the view that Israel’s beliefs in an afterlife were much more vibrant than many scholars have been willing to admit."

According to Donelley, "Twentieth century biblical scholarship largely agrees that the ancient Jews had little explicit notion of a personal afterlife until very late in the Old Testament period," and "only the latest stratum of the Old Testament asserts even the resurrection of the body." Scholars have noted that the notion of the "disembodied existence of a soul in bliss" is not in accordance with a Hebrew world view: "While Hebrew thought world distinguished soul from body (as material basis of life), there was no question of two separate, independent entities." Gillman argues that

In contrast to the two enigmatic references to Enoch and Elijah, there are ample references to the fact that death is the ultimate destiny for all human beings, that God has no contact with or power over the dead, and that the dead do not have any relationship with God (see, inter alia, Ps. 6:6, 30:9–10, 39:13–14, 49:6–13, 115:16–18, 146:2–4). If there is a conceivable setting for the introduction of a doctrine of the afterlife, it would be in Job, since Job, although righteous, is harmed by God in the present life. But Job 10:20–22 and 14:1–10 affirm the opposite.

— Gillman, pages 176–182

However, N. T. Wright suggests that "the Bible offers a spectrum of belief about life after death." While Goldingay suggests that Qohelet points out that there is no evidence that "human beings would enjoy a positive afterlife," Philip Johnston argues that a few Psalms, such as Psalm 16, Psalm 49 and Psalm 73, "affirm a continued communion with God after death," but "give no elaboration of how, when or where this communion will take place."

Neyrey suggests that "for a Hebrew, 'soul' indicated the unity of a human person," and "this Hebrew field of meaning is breached in the Wisdom of Solomon by explicit introduction of Greek ideas of soul. Avery-Peck argues that

Scripture does not present even a rudimentarily developed theology of the soul. The creation narrative is clear that all life originates with God. Yet the Hebrew Scripture offers no specific understanding of the origin of individual souls, of when and how they become attached to specific bodies, or of their potential existence, apart from the body, after death. The reason for this is that, as we noted at the beginning, the Hebrew Bible does not present a theory of the soul developed much beyond the simple concept of a force associated with respiration, hence, a life-force.

— Avery-Peck, pages 1343–1351

Regardless of the character of the soul's existence in the intermediate state, biblical scholarship affirms that a disembodied soul is unnatural and at best transitional. Bromiley argues that "the soul and the body belong together, so that without either the one or the other there is no true man. Disembodied existence in Sheol is unreal. Paul does not seek a life outside the body, but wants to be clothed with a new and spiritual body (1 Cor. 15; 2 Cor. 5)."

The mortalist disbelief in the existence of a naturally immortal soul, is affirmed as biblical teaching by a range of standard scholarly Jewish and Christian sources. The Blackwell Encyclopedia of Modern Christian Thought (1995) says, "There is no concept of an immortal soul in the Old Testament, nor does the New Testament ever call the human soul immortal." Harper's Bible Dictionary (1st ed. 1985) says that "For a Hebrew, 'soul' indicated the unity of a human person; Hebrews were living bodies, they did not have bodies". Cressey 1996 says, "But to the Bible man is not a soul in a body but a body/soul unity". Avery-Peck 2000 says, "Scripture does not present even a rudimentarily developed theology of the soul" and "The notion of the soul as an independent force that animates human life but that can exist apart from the human body—either prior to conception and birth or subsequent to life and death—is the product only of later Judaism". The New Dictionary of Theology says that the Septuagint translated the Hebrew word nefesh by the Greek word psyche, but the latter does not have the same sense in Greek thought. The Eerdmans Dictionary of the Bible, 2000 says, "Far from referring simply to one aspect of a person, "soul" refers to the whole person". The International Standard Bible Encyclopedia says, "Possibly Jn. 6:33 also includes an allusion to the general life-giving function. This teaching rules out all ideas of an emanation of the soul." and "The soul and the body belong together, so that without either the one or the other there is no true man". The Eerdmans Bible Dictionary, 1987 says, "Indeed, the salvation of the "immortal soul" has sometimes been a commonplace in preaching, but it is fundamentally unbiblical." The Encyclopedia of Christianity, 2003 says "The Hebrew Bible does not present the human soul (nepeš) or spirit (rûah) as an immortal substance, and for the most part it envisions the dead as ghosts in Sheol, the dark, sleepy underworld". The Oxford Dictionary of the Christian Church, 2005 says, "there is practically no specific teaching on the subject in the Bible beyond an underlying assumption of some form of afterlife (see immortality)". The Zondervan Encyclopedia of the Bible (rev ed.), 2009 says "It is this essential soul-body oneness that provides the uniqueness of the biblical concept of the resurrection of the body as distinguished from the Greek idea of the immortality of the soul".

The mortalist disbelief in the existence of a naturally immortal soul is also affirmed as biblical teaching by various modern theologians, (Note: Fudge admits that belief in the immortality of the soul is the main current in church history. He, however, favors another view: "Crisscrossing all of this flows the stream of Christian mortalism.… This understanding appears as the sparkling water of pristine Christianity". He defines mortalism as "the belief that according to divine revelation the soul does not exist as an independent substance after the death of the body.") and Hebblethwaite observes the doctrine of immortality of the soul is "not popular amongst Christian theologians or among Christian philosophers today".

== See also ==
- Eternal oblivion, the belief that consciousness forever ceases upon death

== Bibliography ==
- Almond (1994), Heaven and Hell in Enlightenment England
- Avery-Peck. "Soul". In Neusner, Green & Avery-Peck (2000).
- Ball (2008), The Soul Sleepers: Christian Mortalism from Wycliffe to Priestley.
- Blackburne (1765), A short historical view of the controversy concerning an intermediate state and the separate existence of the soul between death and the general resurrection, deduced from the beginning of the Protestant Reformation, to the present times.
- Brandon (2007), The coherence of Hobbes's Leviathan: civil and religious authority combined.
- Bromiley (2002), "Psychology", The International Standard Bible Encyclopedia, vol. 3 (rev ed.).
- Constas, Nicholas (2001), Talbot, Alice-Mary (ed.), "'To Sleep, Perchance to Dream': The Middle State of Souls in Patristic and Byzantine Literature", Dumbarton Oaks Papers, 55: 92–124, doi:10.2307/1291814, JSTOR 1291814, archived from the original on 23 September 2015.
- Donelley (1976), Calvinism and Scholasticism in Vermigli's doctrine of man and grace.
- Fudge, Edward; Peterson (2000), Two views of hell: a biblical & theological dialogue.
- Ellingsen, Mark (1999), Reclaiming Our Roots: Martin Luther to Martin Luther King.
- Finger (2004), A contemporary Anabaptist theology: biblical, historical, constructive.
- Froom (1966), The Conditionalist Faith of Our Fathers.
- Gillman. "Death and Afterlife, Judaic Doctrines of". In Neusner, Green & Avery-Peck (2000).
- Goldingay, John (2006), Old Testament Theology, vol. 2.
- Grant, Miles (1895), Positive Theology.
- de Greef, Wulfert (2008), The writings of John Calvin: an introductory guide.
- Hoekema, Anthony A (1994), The Bible and the Future, Grand Rapids, MI: William B Eerdmans.
- Kries, Douglas (1997), Piety and humanity: essays on religion and early modern political philosophy.
- Lake (2009), "Soul", in Silva; Tenney (eds.), The Zondervan Encyclopedia of the Bible, vol. 5 (rev ed.).
- Larsen (2001), "Heaven and Hell in the Preaching of the Gospel: A Historical Survey", Trinity Journal, 22 (2).
- Luther, Martin (1830), Exegetica opera Latina (in Latin), Gottlieb: Christopf Stephan Elsberger.
- Marshall (2002), Beliefs and the dead in Reformation England.
- Milton, John (1825), A Treatise on Christian Doctrine: Compiled from the Holy Scriptures Alone, J. Smith – via Google Books. Via Archive.org
- Moody (1990), The Word of Truth: A Summary of Christian Doctrine Based on Biblical Revelation.
- Neusner, Jacob; Green, William Scott; Avery-Peck, Alan J., eds. (2000), The Encyclopedia of Judaism, vol. 1, Leiden: Brill, ISBN 9004110046, OCLC 313496275.
- Neyrey (1985), "Soul", in Achtemeier; Harper; Row (eds.), Bible Dictionary, pp. 982–83.
- Pool (1998), Against returning to Egypt: Exposing and Resisting Credalism in the Southern Baptist Convention.
- Rudavsky (2010), Maimonides.
- Snobelen (1993), Revelation and Reason: The Development, Rationalization and Influence of Socinianism (honors thesis).
- Vauchez (1966), The History of Conditionalism, Studies, vol. 4, 5, Andrews University Seminary.
- Watts (1985), The Dissenters: From the Reformation to the French Revolution, Oxford.
- Williams, George Huntston (1962), The Radical Reformation.
- Wright (2003), The Resurrection of the Son of God.
