= Thomas Lydiat =

Clergyman and Mathematician (1572-1646)

Thomas Lydiat (1572 – 3 April 1646) was a clergyman and mathematician in England. In his time he was noted as a chronologer and was an opponent in controversy of Joseph Justus Scaliger. He is now considered, albeit in a very different type of theory, to have provided in 1605 a clear suggestion of an oval orbit in astronomy, anticipating Johannes Kepler, with whom he also had a controversial exchange relating to chronology.

His contemporaries ranked him with Joseph Mede and Francis Bacon. His ultimate poverty, certainly exaggerated, furnished Samuel Johnson with an allusion in his poem on the Vanity of Human Wishes.

== Life ==
The son of Christopher Lydiat, he was born in 1572 at Alkerton, Oxfordshire, of which living his father was patron. In 1584, at eleven years of age, he gained a scholarship at Winchester College, and passing thence to New College, Oxford, was elected probationer fellow in 1591, and full fellow two years later. He graduated B.A. 3 May 1595, and M.A. 5 February 1599.

Defective memory and speech led him to give up both the study of divinity and his fellowship in 1603, in order to devote himself to mathematics and chronology. In 1609 he dedicated his Emendatio Temporum to Henry Frederick, Prince of Wales, who appointed him his chronographer and cosmographer, and took him into his household as reader, granting him an annual pension and the use of his library. During the course of this year he became acquainted with James Ussher.

He spent about two years in Dublin, became fellow of Trinity College, Dublin 7 March 1610, and graduated M.A. there in the summer of the same year. Ussher found him rooms in the college and an appointment as reader, with a salary. The mastership of The Royal School, Armagh, seems also to have been promised him. Before August 1611 he had returned to London, but he still wrote to Ussher pressing his claim to the mastership.

The death of the Prince of Wales in 1612 cut off his hopes of preferment, and in the same year, after some hesitation, he accepted the family living of Alkerton, which he had refused during his father's lifetime. The following years he devoted to the study of chronology, and carried on a controversy with Scaliger; Lydiat's chronological discoveries are described in Robert Plot's Oxfordshire. He constructed a new Rectory, in Alkerton, in 1625. It is considered to be one of the finest small Rectories in the country.

In 1629 or 1630 he became surety for the debts of his brother, and being unable to pay was committed to prison, first in the Bocardo Prison at Oxford, and subsequently in the King's Bench, where he pursued his studies, spending what money he could upon books. The efforts of Sir William Boswell, Dr. Robert Pink (Warden of New College), Ussher (who is said to have paid £300 for him), and William Laud, ultimately led to his release. At this point he vainly petitioned the king for permission to travel in Turkey, Armenia, and Abyssinia, in order to collect materials for civil and ecclesiastical history.

Later, Lydiat's staunch royalism and uncompromising expression of his opinions brought him under the notice of the parliamentarians. His rectory was pillaged more than once, and he was carried off to prison, once to Warwick, and again to Banbury. He died at Alkerton, 3 April 1646, and was buried the next day in the chancel of his church. In 1669 a stone was laid over his grave by the society of New College, who also erected a monument, with an inscription to his memory on a black marble table, at the north end of the east cloister of the college.

== Works ==
Lydiat's published works were:

- Tractatus de variis Annorum formis, Lond. 1605.
- Praelectio Astronomica de Natura Coeli et conditionibus Elementorum. Disquisitio Physiologica de origine fontium (these two printed with the first).
- Defensio Tractatus de variis Annorum formis contra J. Scaligeri observationes, Lond. 1607, dedicated to Sir Anthony Cope of Hanwell.
- Examen Canonum Chronologiae Isagogieorum (printed with the 'Defensio').
- Emendatio Temporum ab initio Mundi . . . contra Scaligerum et alios, Lond. 1609.
- Recensio et Explicatio argumentorum — insertia brevibus confutationibus opinionum I. Scaligeranae, Baronianae. . . atque Johannis Keppleri, 1613.
- Solis et Lunae Periodus seu Annus Magnus, Lond. 1620.
- De Anni Solaris Mensura Epistola astronomica ad Hen. Savilium, Lond. 1620.
- Numerus Aureus mellioribus Lapillis insignatus, &c., Lond. 1621.
- Canones Chronologici, Oxford, 1675. Published from a manuscript in the library of John Lamphire.
- Letters to Dr. Jam. Ussher, Primate of Ireland. Printed at the end of Ussher's Life,' 1686, published by Richard Parr.
- Marmoreum Chronicon Arundelianum cum Annotationibus, of which manuscripts are in the Bodleian and Trinity College, Dublin; printed in Humphrey Prideaux's Marmora Oxoniensis.

Soon after Lydiat's death John Worthington and others made efforts to collect Lydiat's manuscripts with a view to having them printed. According to the Preface to Lydiat's Canones Chronologici, his manuscripts were carried off by a countryman to his cottage, where John Lamphire accidentally discovered them some years after Lydiat's death; others were presented to him by Robert Plot. These then passed, apparently, with the rest of Lamphire's property, into the hands of William Coward M.D., who presented to the Bodleian Library fifteen manuscripts.
