= John the Deacon (Byzantine writer) =

The Byzantine John the Deacon (fl. 11th century) is the author of a tract on the veneration of saints and against the doctrine of soul sleep.

He was one of several Byzantine writers who wrote on this theme, from Eustratios of Constantinople and Niketas Stethatos, to Philip Monotropos (Dioptra pp. 210, 220) and Michael Glykas.
