= Rose of Sharon =

Name of flowering plants with biblical origin

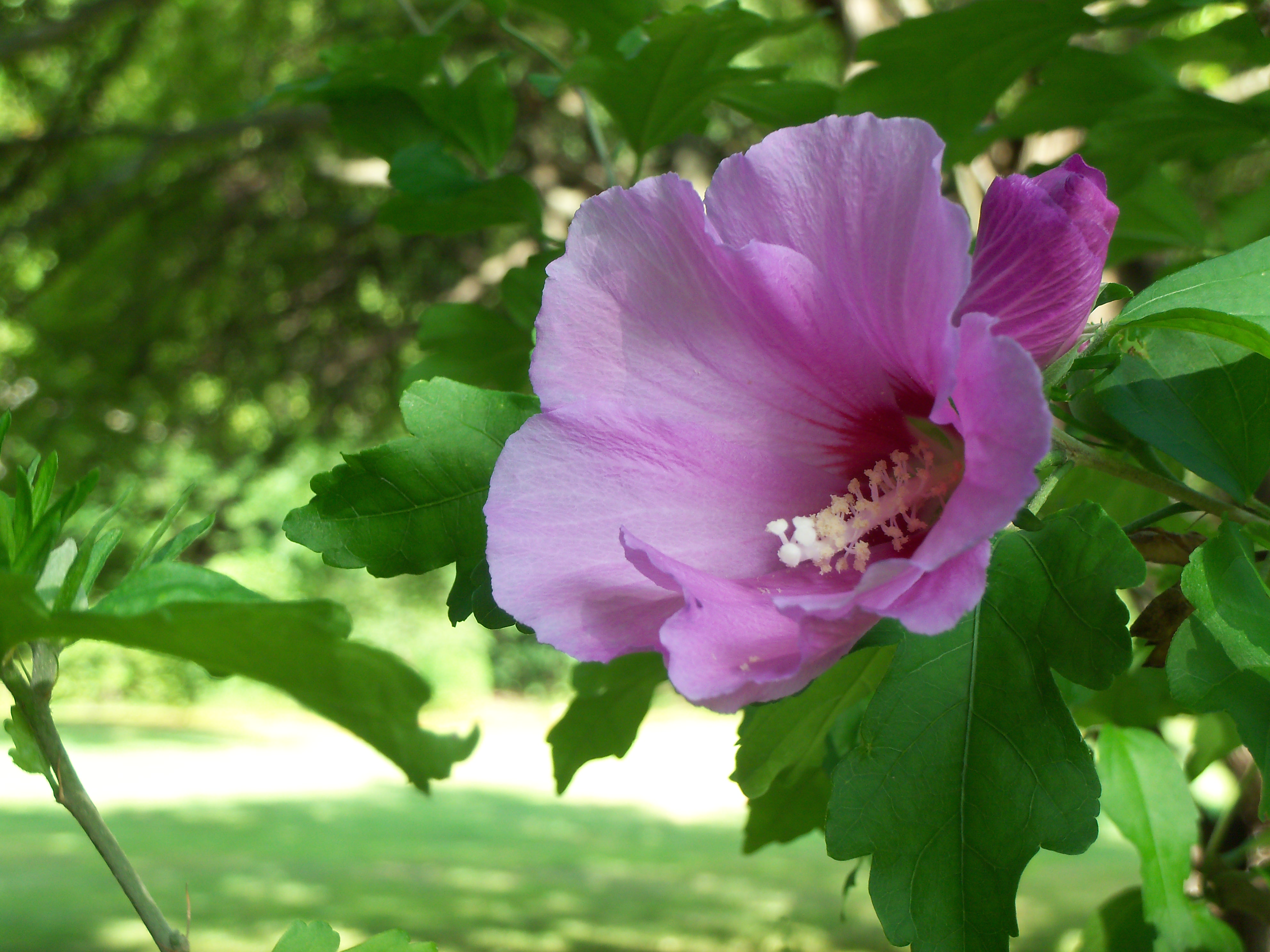
One plant commonly called "rose of Sharon" in the US is Hibiscus syriacus, here seen in bloom.

Rose of Sharon (in Hebrew: חֲבַצֶּלֶת הַשָּׁרוֹן) is a biblical expression, though the identity of the plant referred to is unclear and is disputed among biblical scholars. It has become a common name for several species of flowering plants that are valued in different parts of the world. In no case does it refer to actual roses. The name's varied colloquial application has been used as an example of the lack of precision of common names, which can potentially cause confusion.

== Biblical origins ==
The name "Rose of Sharon" first appears in Hebrew in the Tanakh. In the Shir Hashirim ('Song of Songs') 2:1, the speaker (the beloved) says, "I am the rose of Sharon, a rose of the valley". The Hebrew phrase Biblical Hebrew: חבצלת השרון, romanized: ḥăḇaṣṣeleṯ haššārōn was translated by the editors of the King James Version (KJV) as "rose of Sharon"; however, previous translations had rendered it simply as "the flower of the field" (Septuagint ἐγὼ ἄνθος τοῦ πεδίου, Vulgate ego flos campi, Wycliffe "a flower of the field"). Contrariwise, the Hebrew word ḥăḇaṣṣeleṯ occurs two times in the scriptures: in the Song, and in Isaiah 35:1, which reads, "the desert shall bloom like the rose." The word is translated "rose" in the KJV, but is rendered variously as "lily" (Septuagint κρίνον, Vulgate lilium, Wycliffe "lily"), "jonquil" (Jerusalem Bible) and "crocus" (RSV).

Varying scholars have suggested that the biblical "rose of Sharon" may be one of the following plants:

- A crocus: "a kind of crocus growing as a lily among the brambles" ("Sharon", Harper's Bible Dictionary) or a crocus that grows in the coastal plain of Sharon (New Oxford Annotated Bible);
- A tulip: "a bright red tulip-like flower [...] today prolific in the hills of Sharon" "rose", Harper's Bible Dictionary);
  - Tulipa agenensis, the Sharon tulip, a species of tulip suggested by a few botanists, or;
  - Tulipa montana
- A lily: Lilium candidum, more commonly known as the Madonna lily, a species of lily suggested by some botanists, though likely in reference to the lilies of the valley mentioned in the second part of Song of Solomon 2:1.
- Narcissus

According to an annotation of Song of Solomon 2:1 by the translation committee of the New Revised Standard Version, "rose of Sharon" is a mistranslation of a more general Hebrew word for crocus.

Etymologists have tentatively linked the biblical חבצלת to the words Biblical Hebrew: בצל, romanized: beṣel, meaning 'bulb', and Biblical Hebrew: חמץ, romanized: ḥāmaṣ, which is understood as meaning either 'pungent' or 'splendid' (The Analytical Hebrew and Chaldee Lexicon).

A possible interpretation for the biblical reference is Pancratium maritimum, which blooms in the late summer just above the high-tide mark. The modern Hebrew name for this flower is חבצלת or חבצלת החוף (ḥăḇaṣṣeleṯ or ḥăḇaṣṣeleṯ haḥōf, coastal lily). Some identify this flower with the "rose of Sharon" mentioned in the Song of Songs, but not all scholars accept this.

Recently, some scholars have translated ḥăḇaṣṣeleṯ as 'a budding bulb' in consideration of the genealogical research of multilingual versions and lexicons.

== Modern usage ==
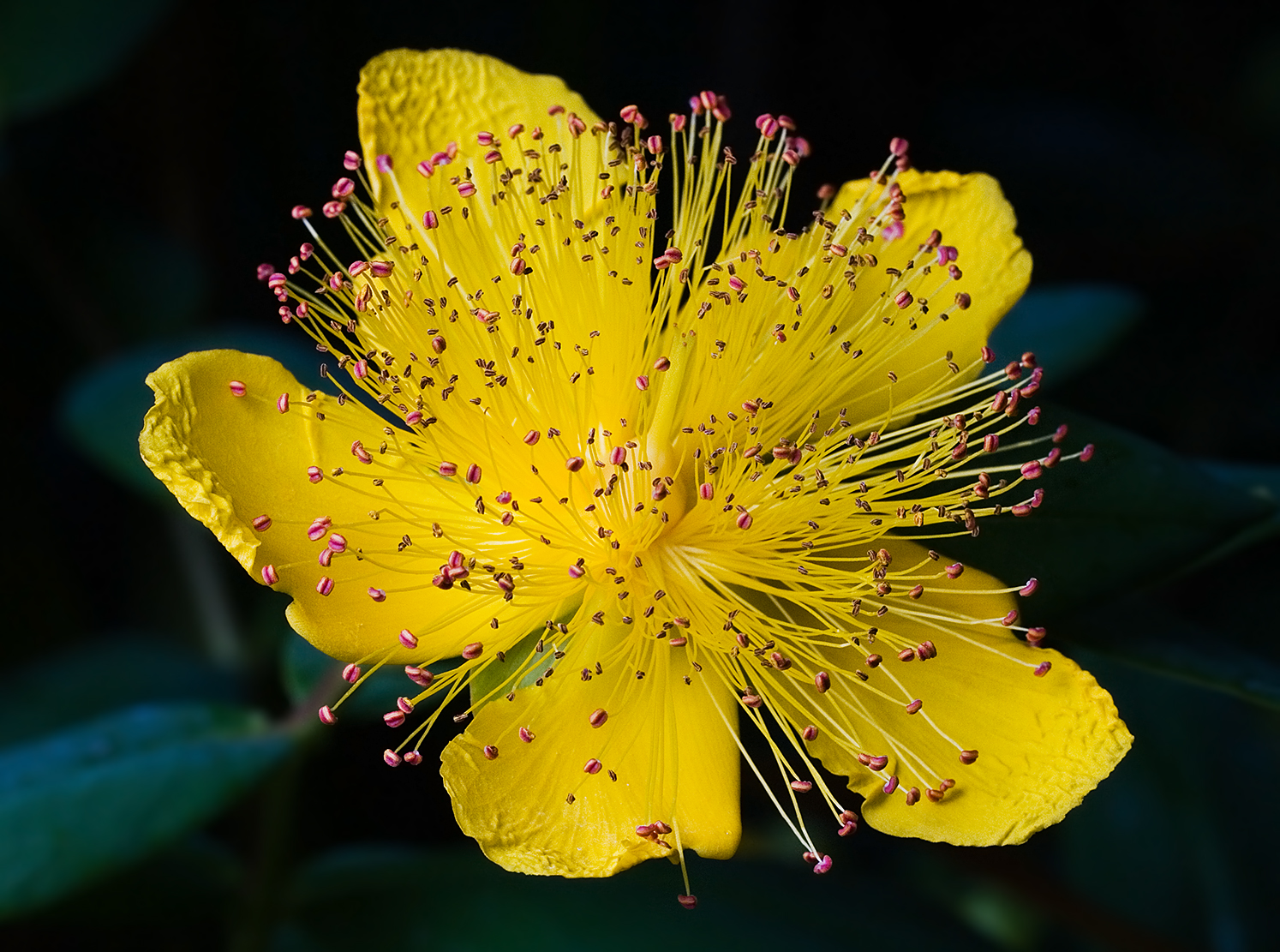
Hypericum calycinum

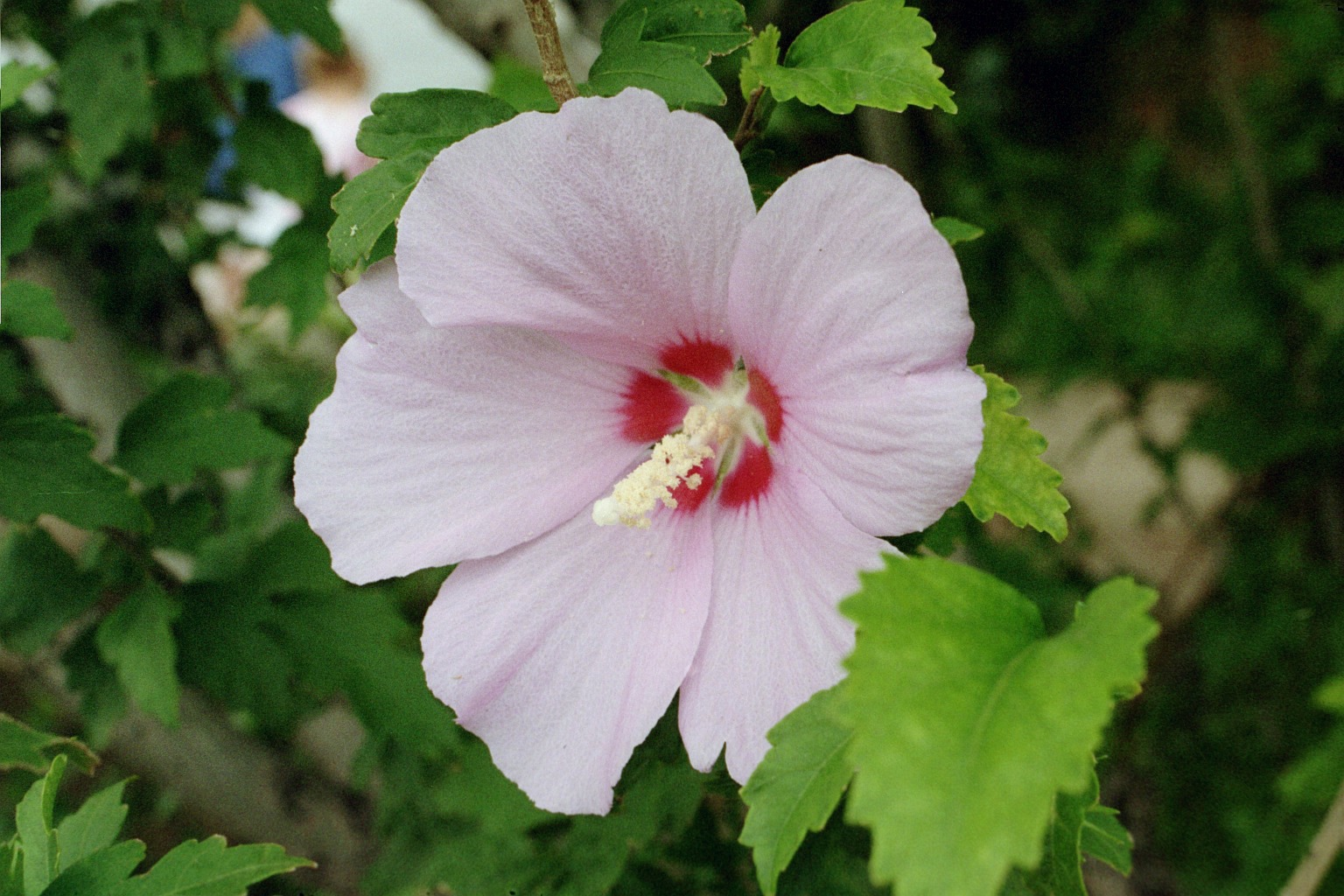
Hibiscus syriacus

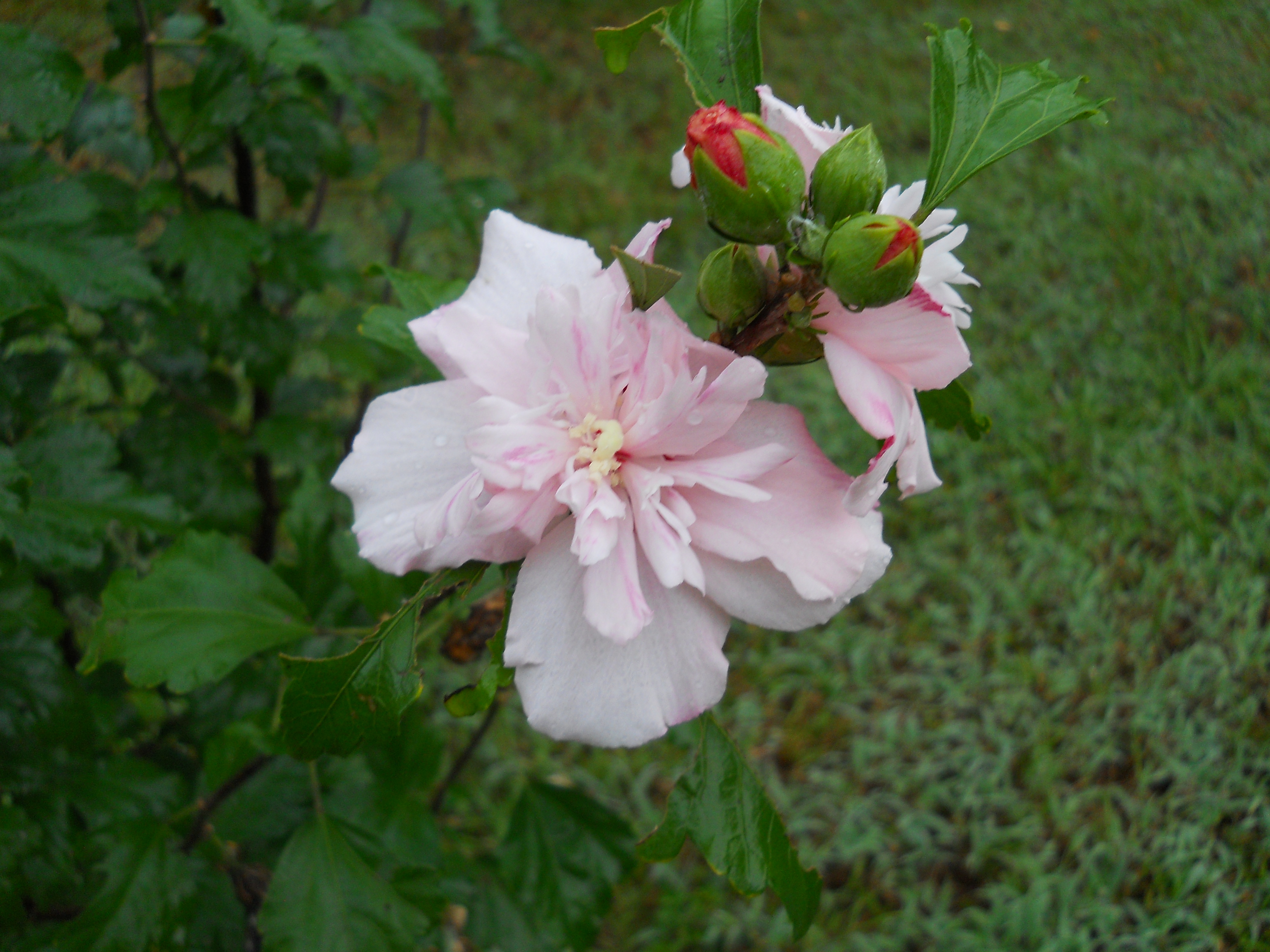
Hibiscus syriacus double bloom

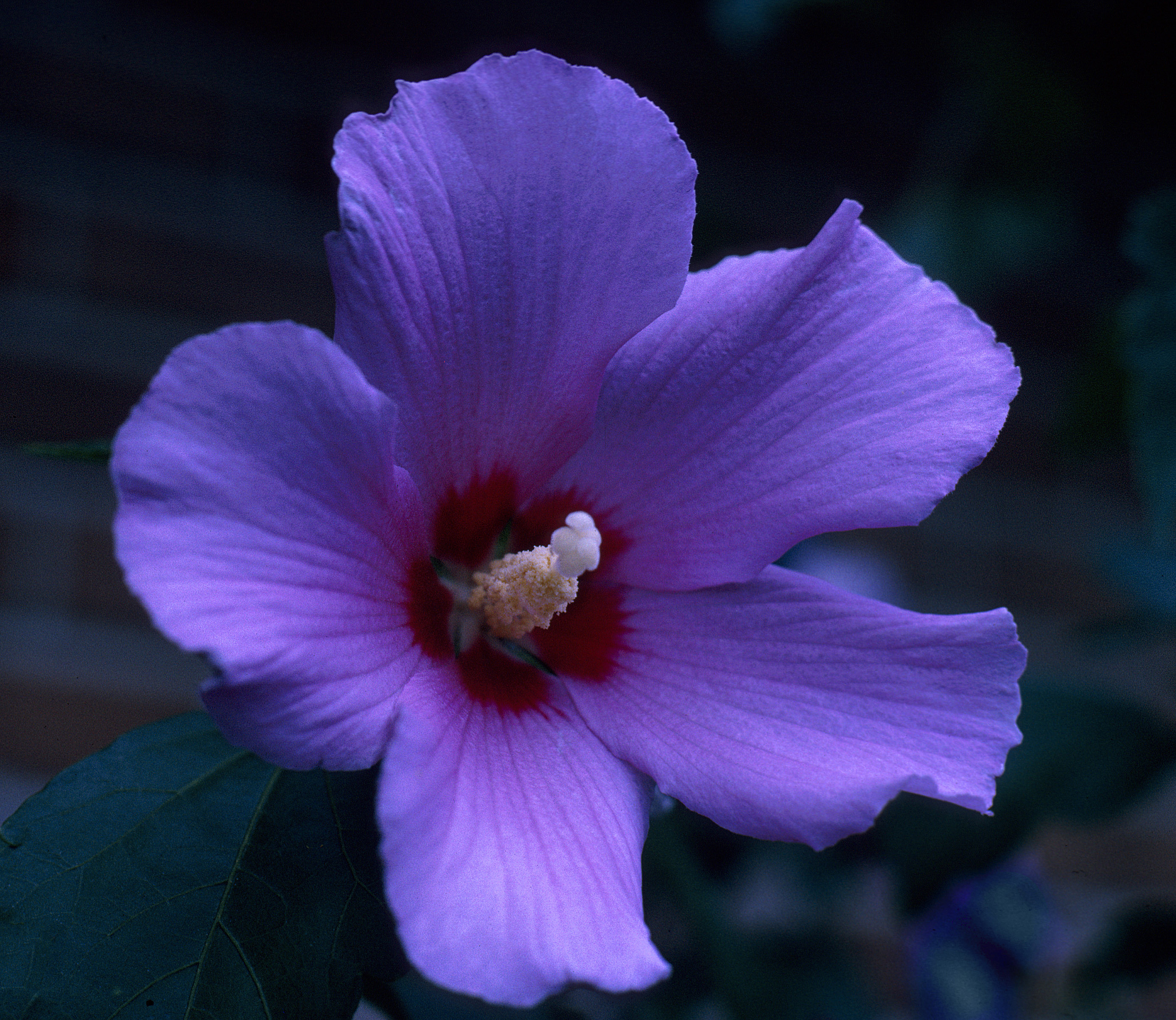
Rose of Sharon or althaea

The name "rose of Sharon" is also commonly applied to several horticultural plants, all originating outside the Levant and not likely to have been the plant from the Bible:

- Hypericum calycinum, the usual plant known by this name in British English. It is an evergreen flowering shrub native to southeast Europe and southwest Asia.
- Hibiscus syriacus, the usual plant known by this name in North America. It is a deciduous flowering shrub native to east Asia, and the national flower of South Korea (also known as "Mugunghwa" and "Althaea").
- Hibiscus rosa-sinensis (var. 'Vulcan'), the national flower of Malaysia.

== As a human name ==
Rose of Sharon, pronounced "Rosasharn," is occasionally a personal name. Most famously, a character named Rose of Sharon Joad appears in John Steinbeck's novel The Grapes of Wrath. In Fallout: New Vegas, a character named Rose of Sharon Cassidy can be a potential companion for the Courier.

== General and cited references ==
- Crawford, P. L. (1995). "Rose". In Paul J. Achtemeier (gen. ed.) (ed.). Harper's Bible Dictionary. San Francisco: Harper. p. 884.
- Davidson, Benjamin (1978) [1848]. The Analytical Hebrew and Chaldee Lexicon (1st softcover ed.). Grand Rapids, Michigan: Zondervan. p. 246. ISBN 0-310-39891-6.
- Lapp, N. L. (1985). "Sharon". In Paul J. Achtemeier (gen. ed.) (ed.). Harper's Bible Dictionary. San Francisco: Harper. pp. 933–4.
- Scott, R. B. Y. (1991). "Annotations to Song of Solomon". The New Oxford Annotated Bible. New York: Oxford University Press. pp. 854 OT.
- Yu, Myŏng-jong; Lee, Ji-Hye; Chŏn, Sŏng-yŏng (2008). 100 Cultural Symbols of Korea: 100 windows showcasing Korea (First ed.). Seoul: Discovery Media.
