= Annihilationism =

Doctrine that the unsaved cease to exist at death

In Christianity, annihilationism (also known as extinctionism or destructionism) is the belief that after the Last Judgment, all damned humans and fallen angels (demons) including Satan will be totally destroyed and their consciousness extinguished. Annihilationism stands in contrast to both the belief in eternal torment and to the universalist belief that everyone will be saved. Partial annihilationism holds that unsaved humans are obliterated but demonic beings suffer forever.

Annihilationism is directly related to Christian conditionalism, the idea that a human soul is not immortal unless given eternal life. Annihilationism asserts that God will destroy and cremate the wicked, leaving only the righteous to live on in immortality. Thus those who do not repent of their sins are eventually destroyed because of the incompatibility of sin with God's holy character. Jehovah's Witnesses believe that there can be no punishment after death because the dead cease to exist.

Annihilationism has appeared throughout Christian history and was defended by several Church Fathers, but it has often been in the minority. It experienced a resurgence in the 1980s when several prominent theologians including John Stott argued that it could be held as a legitimate interpretation of biblical texts by those who give supreme authority to scripture. Earlier in the 20th century, some theologians at the University of Cambridge including Basil Atkinson supported the belief. Twentieth-century English theologians who favor annihilation include Bishop Charles Gore (1916), William Temple, 98th Archbishop of Canterbury (1924); Oliver Chase Quick, Chaplain to the Archbishop of Canterbury (1933), Ulrich Ernst Simon (1964), and G. B. Caird (1966).

Some annihilationist Christian denominations were influenced by the Millerite/Adventist movement of the mid-19th century. These include the Seventh-day Adventists, Bible Students, Christadelphians and various Advent Christian churches. Additionally, some Protestant and Anglican writers have also proposed annihilationist doctrines. The Church of England's Doctrine Commission reported in 1995 that Hell may be a state of "total non-being".

Annihilationists base their belief on their exegesis of scripture, some early church writings, historical criticism of the doctrine of eternal conscious torment, and eternal conscious torment as being inconsistent with God's character. The main Biblical arguments for annihilationism rest in the mortality of man and the just punishment for sin (1 Timothy 6:15-16; 1 Corinthians 15:53-55; Romans 6:23). They claim that the popular conceptions of Hell stem from Jewish speculation during the intertestamental period, belief in an immortal soul which originated in Greek philosophy and influenced Christian theologians, literal interpretation of symbols in Revelation, and also graphic and imaginative medieval art and poetry.

== History ==
=== Old Testament ===
Proponents of annihilationism believe that the Bible teaches that the wicked are punished eternally; they believe that punishment is complete destruction for eternity. Appealed to here are references to an "unquenchable fire" and "undying worm" in the Old Testament (Isaiah 66:24; cf. 2 Kings 22:17; Isaiah 17:2–7; 51:8; Jeremiah 4:4; 7:20; 21:12; Ezekiel 20:47–48; Malachi 4:1-3), which refer to the finality of judgement. Similarly, the New Testament teaches that the wicked will be punished with destruction for their sins (cf. Matthew 10:28; Acts 3:23; Philippians 3:19; 1 Thessalonians 5:3; 2 Thessalonians 1:9; 2 Peter 2:6; 2 Peter 3:7; Jude 1:7).

=== Church Fathers and later ===
Christian writers from Tertullian to Luther have held to traditional notions of Hell. However, the annihilationist position is not without some historical precedent. Early forms of annihilationism or conditional immortality are claimed to be found in the writings of Ignatius of Antioch (d. 108/140), Justin Martyr (d. 165), and Irenaeus (d. 202), among others. However, the teachings of Arnobius (d. 330) are often interpreted as the first to defend annihilationism explicitly. One quote, in particular, stands out in Arnobius' second book Against the Heathen:

Your interests are in jeopardy,—the salvation, I mean, of your souls; and unless you give yourselves to seek to know the Supreme God, a cruel death awaits you when freed from the bonds of body, not bringing sudden annihilation, but destroying by the bitterness of its grievous and long-protracted punishment.

Dr. Graham Keith of Scotland, in his article "Patristic Views on Hell", notes the following: "Indeed, a century or so after Constantine [i.e. the 4th–5th centuries] we have a surprising amount of evidence indicating widespread denial of eternal punishment within the church."

Eternal torment has been "the semiofficial position of the church since approximately the sixth century", according to Pinnock.

Additionally, at least one of John Wesley's recorded sermons is often reluctantly understood as implying annihilationism. Contrarily, the denominations of Methodism which arose through his influence typically do not agree with annihilationism.

An example of a more modern annihilationist is Kirk Cameron.

=== Roman Catholicism ===
As much as certain Church Fathers and Catholic theologians have advocated qualified forms of universalism, some Catholic theologians have advocated qualified forms of annihilationism as being in line with Catholic teaching.

=== Anglicanism ===
The doctrine of annihilation of the "wicked" following a judgment day at a literal return of Christ has had a following in the Anglican Communion. In 1945 a report by the Archbishops' Commission on Evangelism, Towards the conversion of England, caused controversy with statements including that "Judgment is the ultimate separation of the evil from the good, with the consequent destruction of all that opposes itself to God's will."

=== Millerite and Adventist movement ===
Recently the doctrine has been most often associated with groups descended from or with influences from the Millerite movement of the mid-19th century. These include the Seventh-day Adventist Church, the Church of God (7th day) – Salem Conference, the Bible Students, Jehovah's Witnesses, the Christadelphians, the followers of Herbert Armstrong, and the various Advent Christian churches. (The Millerite movement consisted of 50,000 to 100,000 people in the United States who eagerly expected the soon return of Jesus, and originated around William Miller.)

George Storrs introduced the belief to the Millerites. He had been a Methodist minister and antislavery advocate. He was introduced to annihilationism when in 1837 he read a pamphlet by Henry Grew. He published tracts in 1841 and 1842 arguing for conditionalism and annihilation. He became a Millerite, and started the Bible Examiner in 1843 to promote these doctrines. However most leaders of the movement rejected these beliefs, other than Charles Fitch who accepted conditionalism. Still, in 1844 the movement officially decided these issues were not essential points of belief.

The Millerites expected Jesus to return around 1843 or 1844, based on Bible texts including Daniel 8:14, and one Hebrew calendar. When the most expected date of Jesus' return (October 22, 1844) passed uneventfully, the "Great Disappointment" resulted. Followers met in 1845 to discuss the future direction of the movement, and were henceforth known as "Adventists". However, they split on the issues of conditionalism and annihilation. The dominant group, which published the Advent Herald, adopted the traditional position of the immortal soul, and became the American Evangelical Adventist Conference. On the other hand, groups behind the Bible Advocate and Second Advent Watchman adopted conditionalism. Later, the main advocate of conditionalism became the World's Crisis publication, which started in the early 1850s, and played a key part in the origin of the Advent Christian Church. Storrs came to believe the wicked would never be resurrected. He and like-minded others formed the Life and Advent Union in 1863.

==== Seventh-day Adventist Church ====
The Seventh-day Adventist Church view of Hell is held to be as annihilation and it is one of its distinctive tenets. They believe that death is a decreation, or an undoing of what was created. This is described in Ecclesiastes 12:7: "When a person dies, the body turns to dust again, and the spirit goes back to God, who gave it." The spirit of every person who dies—whether saved or unsaved—returns to God at death. The spirit that returns to God at death is the breath of life.

All the dead are unconscious until resurrection. There is not a body/soul dualism with an immortal soul going immediately to heaven or torment. There are two judgements. The first is for believers. Christ returns to resurrect and reward the righteous. The second is a millennial judgment of unbelievers, and in this judgement, unbelievers are annihilated or uncreated, and their spirit returns to God - the spirit being identified as the breath of life.

Ellen G. White rejected the immortal soul concept in 1843. Her husband James White, along with Joseph Bates, formerly belonged to the conditionalist Christian Connection, and hinted at this belief in early publications. Together, the three constitute the primary founders of this denomination.

Articles appeared in the primary magazine of the movement in the 1850s, and two books were published. Annihilationism was apparently established in the church by the middle of that decade. (In the 1860s, the group adopted the name "Seventh-day Adventist" and organized more formally.) D. M. Canright and Uriah Smith produced later books.

A publication with a noticeable impact in the wider Christian world was The Conditionalist Faith of our Fathers (2 vols, 1965–1966) by Le Roy Froom. It has been described by Clark Pinnock as "a classic defense of conditionalism". It is a lengthy historical work, documenting the supporters throughout history.

Robert Brinsmead, an Australian and former Seventh-day Adventist best known for his Present Truth Magazine, originally sponsored Edward Fudge to write The Fire that Consumes.

Samuele Bacchiocchi, best known for his study From Sabbath to Sunday, has defended annihilation. Pinnock wrote the foreword.

The Seventh-day Adventist Church's official beliefs support annihilation. They hold that the doctrine of eternal conscious torment is incompatible with the concept that God is love. They believe that God loves humans unconditionally, and has no destructive intentions for human beings.

==== Church of God (7th day) – Salem Conference ====
According to the Church of God (7th day) – Salem Conference, the dead are unconscious in their graves and immortality is conditional. When God formed Adam out of the dust of the ground, and before Adam could live, God breathed the breath of life into his body: "And man became a living soul" (Genesis 2:7). See also Ezekiel 18:4, 20. Psalm 146:4 says, "His (man's) breath goeth forth, he returneth to his earth (dust); in that very day his thoughts perish." No man has ascended to heaven except Jesus Christ (John 3:13).

==== Others ====
Other supporters have included Charles Frederic Hudson (1860), Edward White (1878), Emmanuel Petavel-Olliff (1836–1910, in 1889) and others. Early Pentecostal pioneer Charles Fox Parham taught annihilationism.

=== 1900s onwards ===
Annihilationism is gaining as a legitimate belief within modern, conservative Protestant theology since the 1960s, and particularly since the 1980s. It has found support and acceptance among some British evangelicals, although it is viewed with greater suspicion by their American counterparts. Recently, a handful of evangelical theologians, including the prominent evangelical Anglican author John Stott, have offered at least tentative support for the doctrine, touching off a heated debate within mainstream evangelical Christianity.

The subject really gained attention in the late 1980s, from publications by two evangelical Anglicans, John Stott and Philip Hughes. Stott advocated annihilationism in the 1988 book Essentials: A Liberal–Evangelical Dialogue with liberal David Edwards, the first time he publicly did so. However, five years later he said that he had been an annihilationist for around fifty years. Stott wrote, "Well, emotionally, I find the concept [of eternal suffering] intolerable and do not understand how people can live with it without either cauterizing their feelings or cracking under the strain. But our emotions are a fluctuating, unreliable guide to truth ... my question [is not] what does my heart tell me, but what does God's word say?"

Stott argued that the biblical descriptions of Hell only state that Hell itself is eternal, not necessarily that sinners damned to Hell will live eternally in suffering, pointing also to several biblical references to the "destruction" of sinners. Fundamentally, though, Stott argues that an eternal punishment for finite crimes would be incompatible with "the belief that God will judge people 'according to what they [have] done' (e.g. Revelation 20:12), which implies that the penalty inflicted will be commensurate with the evil done." However, despite Stott's personal belief in annihilationism, he cautions, "I do not dogmatize about the position to which I have come. I hold it tentatively... I believe that the ultimate annihilation of the wicked should at least be accepted as a legitimate, biblically founded alternative to their eternal conscious torment."

Philip Hughes published The True Image in 1989, which has been called "[o]ne of the most significant books" in the debate. A portion deals with this issue in particular.

John Wenham's 1974 book The Goodness of God contained a chapter that challenged the traditional church doctrine, and it was the first book from an evangelical publishing house to do so. It was republished later as The Enigma of Evil. He contributed a chapter on conditionalism in the 1992 book Universalism and the Doctrine of Hell. He later published Facing Hell: An Autobiography 1913–1996, which explores the doctrine through an autobiographical approach. His interest in the topic stemmed from the 1930s as a student at the University of Cambridge, where he was influenced by Basil Atkinson. (Wenham is best known for his The Elements of New Testament Greek, which has been a standard textbook for students.) He wrote:

I feel that the time has come when I must declare my mind honestly. I believe that endless torment is a hideous and unscriptural doctrine that has been a terrible burden on the mind of the church for many centuries and a terrible blot on her presentation of the gospel. I should indeed be happy if, before I die, I could help in sweeping it away. Most of all I should rejoice to see a number of theologians ... joining ... in researching this great topic with all its ramifications.

The Fire that Consumes was published in 1982 by Edward Fudge of the Churches of Christ. It was described as "the best book" by Clark Pinnock, a decade later. John Gerstner called it "the ablest critique of hell by a believer in the inspiration of the Bible." Clark Pinnock of McMaster Divinity College has defended annihilation. Earlier, Atkinson had self-published the book Life and Immortality. Theologians from Cambridge have been influential in supporting the annihilationist position, particularly Atkinson.

Annihilationism is also the belief of some liberal Christians within mainstream denominations.

There have been individual supporters earlier. Pentecostal healing evangelist William Branham promoted annihilationism in the last few years before his death in 1965.

The Church of England's Doctrine Commission reported in February 1995 that Hell is not eternal torment. The report, entitled "The Mystery of Salvation" states, "Christians have professed appalling theologies which made God into a sadistic monster. ... Hell is not eternal torment, but it is the final and irrevocable choosing of that which is opposed to God so completely and so absolutely that the only end is total non-being." The British Evangelical Alliance ACUTE report (published in 2000) states the doctrine is a "significant minority evangelical view" that has "grown within evangelicalism in recent years". A 2011 study of British evangelicals showed 19% disagreed a little or a lot with eternal conscious torment, and 31% were unsure.

Several evangelical reactions to annihilationism were published. Another critique was by Paul Helm in 1989. In 1990, J. I. Packer delivered several lectures supporting the traditional doctrine of eternal suffering. The reluctance of many evangelicals is illustrated by the fact that proponents of annihilationism have had trouble publishing their doctrines with evangelical publishing houses, with Wenham's 1973 book being the first.

Some well respected authors have remained neutral. F. F. Bruce wrote, "annihilation is certainly an acceptable interpretation of the relevant New Testament passages ... For myself, I remain agnostic." Comparatively, C. S. Lewis did not systematize his own beliefs. He rejected traditional pictures of the "tortures" of hell, as in The Great Divorce where he pictured it as a drab "grey town". Yet in The Problem of Pain, "Lewis sounds much like an annihilationist." He wrote:

But I notice that Our Lord, while stressing the terror of hell with unsparing severity usually emphasizes the idea not of duration but of finality. Consignment to the destroying fire is usually treated as the end of the story—not as the beginning of a new story. That the lost soul is eternally fixed in its diabolical attitude we cannot doubt: but whether this eternal fixity implies endless duration—or duration at all—we cannot say.

The Catechism of the Catholic Church (1992) describes Hell as "eternal death" (paragraph 1861) and elsewhere states that "the chief punishment of hell is that of eternal separation from God" (paragraph 1035). The question is what "eternal" means in this context. Thomas Aquinas, following Boethius, states that "eternity is the full, perfect and simultaneous possession of unending life" (Summa Theologica I, question 10), so apparently eternal separation from God is a "negative eternity", a complete and permanent separation from God. In the Collect (opening prayer) for the eighth Sunday after Pentecost in the Tridentine missal, we find the words "qui sine te esse non possumus", meaning "we who without Thee cannot be (or exist)".

=== Conditional immortality ===
The doctrine is often, although not always, bound up with the notion of "conditional immortality", a belief that the soul is not innately immortal. They are related yet distinct. God, who alone is immortal (1 Timothy 6:15-16), passes on the gift of immortality to the righteous (1 Corinthians 15:53-55; 2 Timothy 1:10), who will live forever in Heaven or on an idyllic Earth or World to Come, while the wicked will ultimately face a second death.

Those who describe or believe in this doctrine may not use "annihilationist" to define the belief, and the terms "mortalist" and "conditionalist" are often used. Edward Fudge (1982) uses "annihilationist" to refer to both the "mortalists" and "conditionalists" who believe in a universal resurrection, as well as those groups which hold that not all the wicked will rise to face the New Testament's "resurrection of the dead, both of the just and unjust".

== Justifications ==
=== Cited texts ===
- James 4:12 "God alone, who gave the law, is the Judge. He alone has the power to save or to destroy."
- Hebrews 10:39 "But we are not like those who turn away from God to their own destruction..."
- Philippians 3:18-19 "For I have told you often before, and I say it again with tears in my eyes, that there are many whose conduct shows they are really enemies of the cross of Christ. 19 They are headed for destruction."
- Psalm 92:7 "Though the wicked sprout like weeds and evildoers flourish they will be destroyed forever."
- Psalm 37:20 "But the wicked will die... they will disappear like smoke."
- Psalm 1:6: "... For the Lord watches over the path of the godly, but the path of the wicked leads to destruction."
- Hebrews 10:26-27 NLT "There is only the terrible expectation of God's judgment and the raging fire that will consume his enemies."
- 2 Peter 3:7 "...for the day of judgment, when ungodly people will be destroyed."
- Romans 2:7 "He will give eternal life to those who keep on doing good, seeking after the glory and honor and immortality that God offers."
- Genesis 3:19 "For you were made from dust, and to dust you will return."
- Psalm 146:4 "When they breathe their last, they return to the earth, and all their plans die with them."
- Ecclesiastes 9:5 "For the living know that they shall die: but the dead know not any thing, neither have they any more a reward; for the memory of them is forgotten."
- Ezekiel 18:20 "The person who sins is the one who will die."
- 2 Chronicles 28:3 "He burned incense in the Valley of the Son of Hinnom, and burned his children in the fire, according to the abominations of the nations whom the Lord had cast out before the children of Israel." (the Valley of Ben Hinnom is where the concept of Gehenna or Hell comes from)
- Jeremiah 19:5 "They have built pagan shrines to Baal, and there they burn their sons as sacrifices to Baal. I have never commanded such a horrible deed; it never even crossed my mind to command such a thing!" (the Valley of Ben Hinnom is where the concept of Gehenna or Hell comes from)
- Malachi 4:1, 4:3 "The day of judgment is coming, burning like a furnace. On that day the arrogant and the wicked will be burned up like straw. They will be consumed—roots, branches, and all... On the day when I act, you will tread upon the wicked as if they were dust under your feet", says the Lord of Heaven's Armies."
- Matthew 10:28 "And fear not them which kill the body, but are not able to kill the soul: but rather fear him which is able to destroy both soul and body in hell."
- John 3:16 "For God so loved the world that he gave his only Son, so that everyone who believes in him may not perish but may have eternal life."
- John 6:51 "I am the living bread that came down from heaven. Anyone who eats this bread will live forever" (the offer to live forever only makes sense if it were possible to not live forever.)
- 2 Thessalonians 1:9 "They will be punished with eternal destruction, forever separated from the Lord and from his glorious power."
- Romans 6:23 "For the wages of sin is death."
- 2 Peter 2:6 "and turning the cities of Sodom and Gomorrah into ashes condemned them with an overthrow, having made them an example unto those that should live ungodly"
- Revelation 20:14-15 "And death and Hades were cast into the lake of fire. This is the second death, even the lake of fire. And if any was not found written in the book of life, he was cast into the lake of fire."

John Wenham, a prominent annihilationist, has classified the New Testament texts on the fate of the dead:

- 10 texts (4%) "Gehenna"
- 26 (10%) to "burning up"
- 59 (22%) to "destruction, perdition, utter loss or ruin"
- 20 (8%) to "separation from God"
- 25 (10%) to "death in its finality" or "the second death"
- 108 (41%) to "unforgiven sin", where the precise consequence is not stated
- 15 (6%) to "anguish"

Wenham claims that just a single verse (Revelation 14:11) sounds like eternal torment to him. This is out of a total of 264 references. Ralph Bowles argues the word order of the verse was chosen to fit a chiastic structure, and does not support eternal punishment. Opponents of annihilationism, however, say that there are in fact many bible verses supporting their view.

=== Opposing texts ===
Proponents of the traditional Christian doctrine of Hell, such as Millard Erickson, identify the following biblical texts in support of their doctrine:

- Psalm 52:5 "Surely God will bring you down to everlasting ruin: He will snatch you up and pluck you from your tent; he will uproot you from the land of the living."
- Psalm 78:66 "He beat back his enemies; he put them to everlasting shame."
- Isaiah 33:14 "The sinners in Zion are terrified; trembling grips the godless: 'Who of us can dwell with the consuming fire? Who of us can dwell with everlasting burning?'"
- Isaiah 66:24 "And they will go out and look on the dead bodies of those who rebelled against me; the worms that eat them will not die, the fire that burns them will not be quenched, and they will be loathsome to all mankind."
- Jeremiah 23:40 "I will bring on you everlasting disgrace—everlasting shame that will not be forgotten."
- Jeremiah 25:9 "I will completely destroy them and make them an object of horror and scorn, and an everlasting ruin."
- Daniel 12:2 "Multitudes who sleep in the dust of the earth will awake: some to everlasting life, others to shame and everlasting contempt."
- Matthew 8:12 "... where there will be weeping and gnashing of teeth."
- Matthew 10:15 "... it will be more bearable for Sodom and Gomorrah on the day of judgment.."
- Matthew 18:8 "It is better for you to enter life maimed or crippled than to have two hands or two feet and be thrown into eternal fire."
- Matthew 25:41 "Then he will say to those on his left, 'Depart from me, you who are cursed, into the eternal fire prepared for the devil and his angels.'"
- Revelation 14:11 "And the smoke of their torment will rise for ever and ever. There will be no rest day or night for those who worship the beast and its image, or for anyone who receives the mark of its name."
- Revelation 20:10 "And the devil, who deceived them, was thrown into the lake of burning sulfur, where the beast and the false prophet had been thrown. They will be tormented day and night for ever and ever." (This verse leads some annihilationists to conclude that while ordinary human unbelievers will be annihilated, demons will be tormented forever.)

Traditionalist Christians point to biblical references to eternal punishment, as well as eternal elements of this punishment, such as the unquenchable fire, the everlasting shame, the worm that never dies, and the smoke that rises forever, as consistent with the doctrine of eternal, conscious torment. An annihilationist response is that the eternal nature of the fire, worms, and disgrace do not imply eternal conscious torment, only that the punishment has eternal consequences.

Christian universalists have also criticized annihilationism using Biblical references. Books of the Bible argued to possibly support the idea of full reconciliation include the First Epistle to the Corinthians. The sections of 1 Corinthians 15:22, "As all die in Adam, so all will be made alive in Christ", and 1 Corinthians 15:28, "God will be all in all", are cited. Verses that seem to support universalism also include Lamentations 3:31–33 (NIV), "For no one is cast off by the Lord forever. Though he brings grief, he will show compassion, so great is his unfailing love", and 1 Timothy 4:10 (NIV), "We have put our hope in the living God, who is the Savior of all people, and especially of those who believe."

== See also ==
- Christian mortalism, the belief that the soul is “sleeping” until the resurrection of dead and is not naturally immortal
- Eternal oblivion
- Problem of Hell
- Soul death
- Universal reconciliation ("Universalism" in a Christian context)
