= Burnier =

Burnier is a surname. Notable people with the surname include:

- Andreas Burnier (1931–2002), Dutch writer
- Gustave Burnier, footballer
- Louis Burnier (1795–1873), Swiss Valdensian pastor and writer
- Radha Burnier (1923–2013), Indian theosophist
- Robert Burnier (1897–1974), French film actor
