= Eustratius of Constantinople =

Eustratius or Eustratios (Ancient Greek: Εὐστράτιος; fl. 582–602) was a hagiographer, theologian and priest of Hagia Sophia in Constantinople.

Eustratios was a native of Melitene. He was a pupil of Patriarch Eutychius of Constantinople (552–565, 577–582), whose biography he wrote. It is a basically factual account, although not lacking in rhetorical flourish. It is an important source for the Second Council of Constantinople (553) and for Eutychius' exile in Amaseia (565–577).

In 602, Eustratios finished a biography of the Persian Christian saint Golinduch. He devotes special attention to the role of Bishop Domitian of Melitene in the diplomacy between the Byzantine Empire and the Persian Empire. Domitian was one of his chief informants on the life of Golinduch.

Eustratios also wrote a tract against belief in soul sleep entitled A Refutation of Those Who Say That the Souls of the Dead Are Not Active and Receive No Benefit from the Prayers and Sacrifices Made for Them to God. A Latin translation of this work De statu animarum post mortem was reprinted in 1841. It was written between 582 and 602, possibly in or about 593–594, when there arose in Constantinople a controversy over some miracles attributed to Euphemia. He responds to arguments that the dead are "incapable of activity" (anenergetoi and apraktoi), by countering that the dead are even more active in death.

Gregory the Great's Dialogues, composed around the same time, deal with similar themes as Eustratios' Refutation. Matthew Dal Santo hypothesises that the two men may have known each other in Constantinople. Other Byzantine writers opposing Christian mortalism were John the Deacon, Niketas Stethatos, Philip Monotropos (Dioptra pp. 210, 220), and Michael Glykas.
