= Psychopannychia =

1534 theological treatise by John Calvin

Psychopannychia (Latin from Greek; literally "all-night-vigil of the soul") is the earliest theological treatise by John Calvin dating in Latin manuscript from Orléans, 1534. The tract opposes the mortalism or "soul sleep" taught by Anabaptists and other radical Protestants. Psychopannychia first appeared in print in Latin as Vivere apud Christum non dormire animis sanctos, Strasbourg, 1542, and then in French, in a translation not by Calvin, as Psychopannychie, Geneva, 1558.
