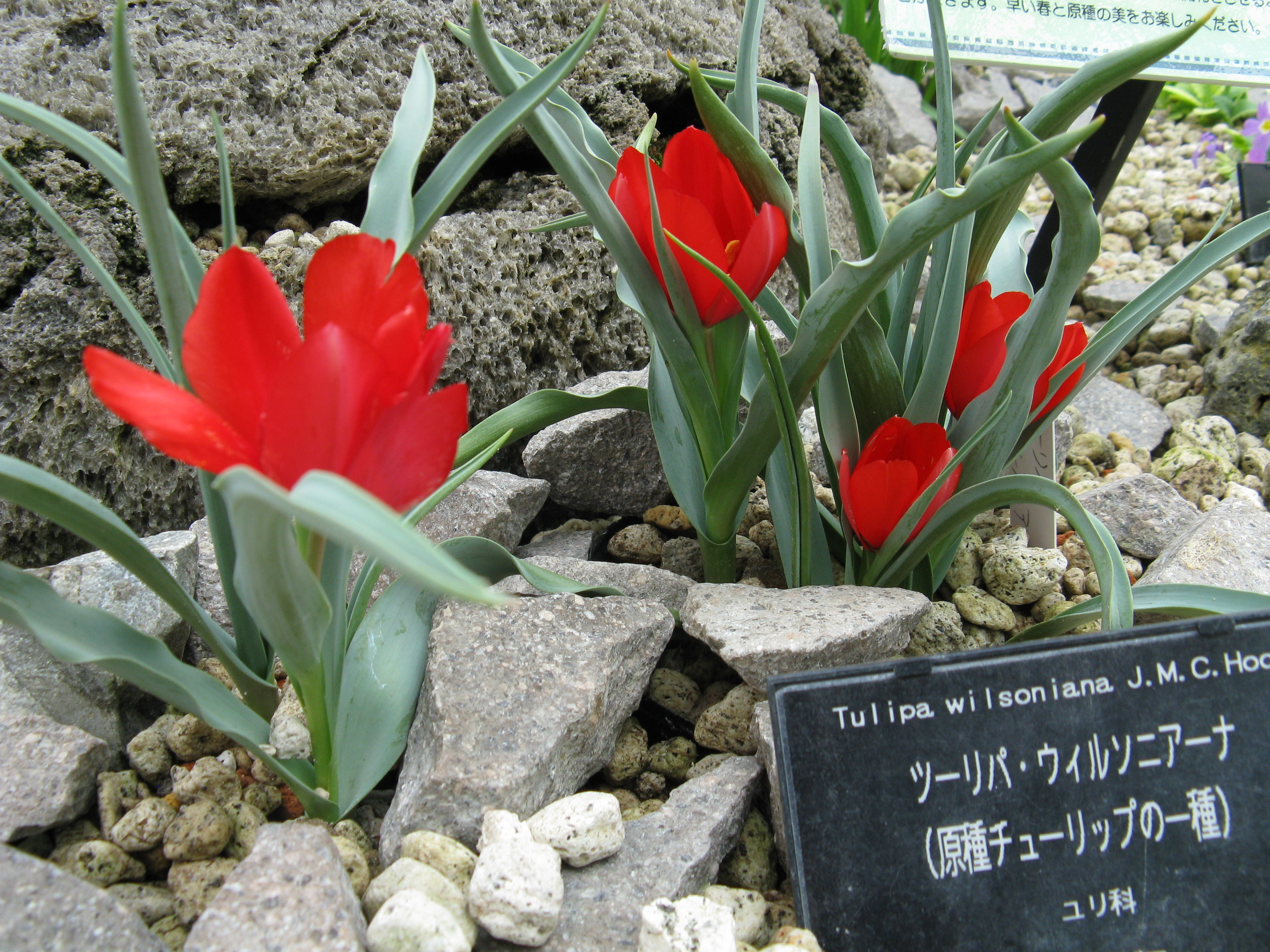
- Tulipa montana here labeled as Tulipa wilsoniana

Scientific classification
- Kingdom: Plantae
- Clade: Tracheophytes
- Clade: Angiosperms
- Clade: Monocots
- Order: Liliales
- Family: Liliaceae
- Subfamily: Lilioideae
- Tribe: Lilieae
- Genus: Tulipa
- Species: T. montana

Binomial name
- Tulipa montana Lindl.

Synonyms
- List: Tulipa biebersteiniana var. aurantiaca Baker; Tulipa chrysantha (Regel) Boiss. ex Benth.; Tulipa giselae Bornm.; Tulipa linifolia f. chrysantha (Regel) Raamsd.; Tulipa montana var. chrysantha Regel; Tulipa montana var. maculata Regel; Tulipa wilsoniana Hoog

= Tulipa montana =

Species of flowering plant

Tulipa montana is a species of tulip native to the mountains of Iran and Turkmenistan. With its deep red petals (there is also a yellow morph) it has been proposed as a candidate for the Biblical Rose of Sharon, whose identity is unknown.

Richard Wilford in his 2006 book Tulips writes, "This really is one of the most alluring of the smaller tulip species".

== Description ==
T. montana is a low-growing perennial bulb, and it can reach up to 15–20 cm (6–8 in) tall.

It has glaucous leaves, then blooms in early spring, or early summer, in April, or as late as July (in America).

It has cup-shaped flowers, that come in shades of red, from scarlet, crimson, to deepest blood-red. Inside the bloom, it has a greenish-black central blotch and yellow anthers. In the wild, there are also yellow forms.

== Taxonomy ==
The Latin specific epithet montana refers to mountains or coming from mountains.

It was first found in Persia in 1826, and then published and described by John Lindley in The Botanical Register (Botanical Register; Consisting of Coloured Figures of Exotic Plants Cultivated in British Gardens; with their History and Mode of Treatment), Vol.13 on page 1106 in 1827.

== Distribution and habitat ==
It is found in the mountains of Iran, Turkmenistan, and possibly, Iraq, around the Caspian Sea.

== Sources ==
- Aldén, B., S. Ryman & M. Hjertson Våra kulturväxters namn - ursprung och användning. Formas, Stockholm (Handbook on Swedish cultivated and utility plants, their names and origin). 2009 (Vara kulturvaxt namn)
- Christenhusz, M. J. M. et al. 2013. Tiptoe through the tulips – cultural history, molecular phylogenetics and classification of Tulipa (Liliaceae) Bot. * J. Linn. Soc. 172:317.
- Raamsdonk, L. W. D. van & T. de Vries 1995. Species relationships and taxonomy in Tulipa subg. Tulipa (Liliaceae) Pl. Syst. Evol. 195:37.
- Rechinger, K. H., ed. Flora iranica. 1963- (F Iran)
- Walters, S. M. et al., eds. European garden flora. 1986- (Eur Gard F)
