= John Tolson (academic) =

English academic administrator

John Tolson D.D. (died 16 December 1644) was an English academic administrator at the University of Oxford.

Tolson was elected Provost (head) of Oriel College, Oxford on 29 June 1621, a post he held until his death in 1644. During his time as Provost of Oriel College, he was also Pro-Vice-Chancellor and Vice-Chancellor of Oxford University. In 1642, at the start of the English Civil War, the Vice-Chancellor John Prideaux left Oxford to take up his position as Bishop of Worcester without formally resigning. His duties were discharged by the Pro-Vice-Chancellors Robert Pincke and then John Tolson. On 7 February 1643, Tolson formally became Vice-Chancellor.

Academic offices
Preceded by William Lewis	Provost of Oriel College, Oxford; 1621–1644	Succeeded by John Saunders
Preceded by John Prideaux	Vice-Chancellor of Oxford University; 1643	Succeeded by Robert Pincke
