= John Prideaux =

English academic and Bishop of Worcester

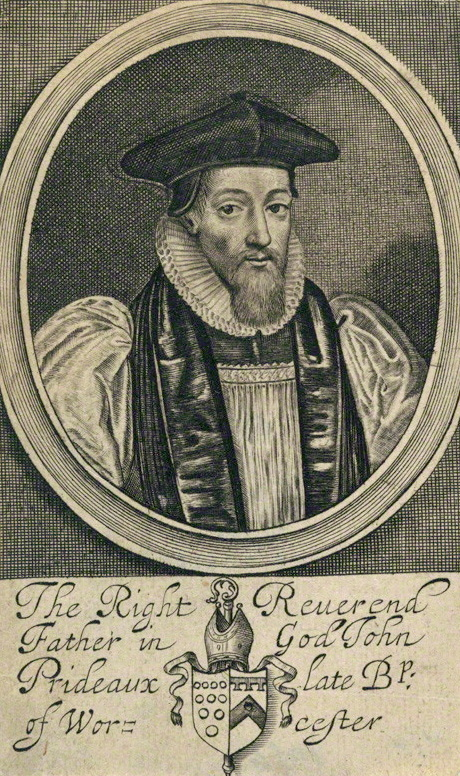
Bishop Prideaux, with arms shown below of the See of Worcester impaling Prideaux

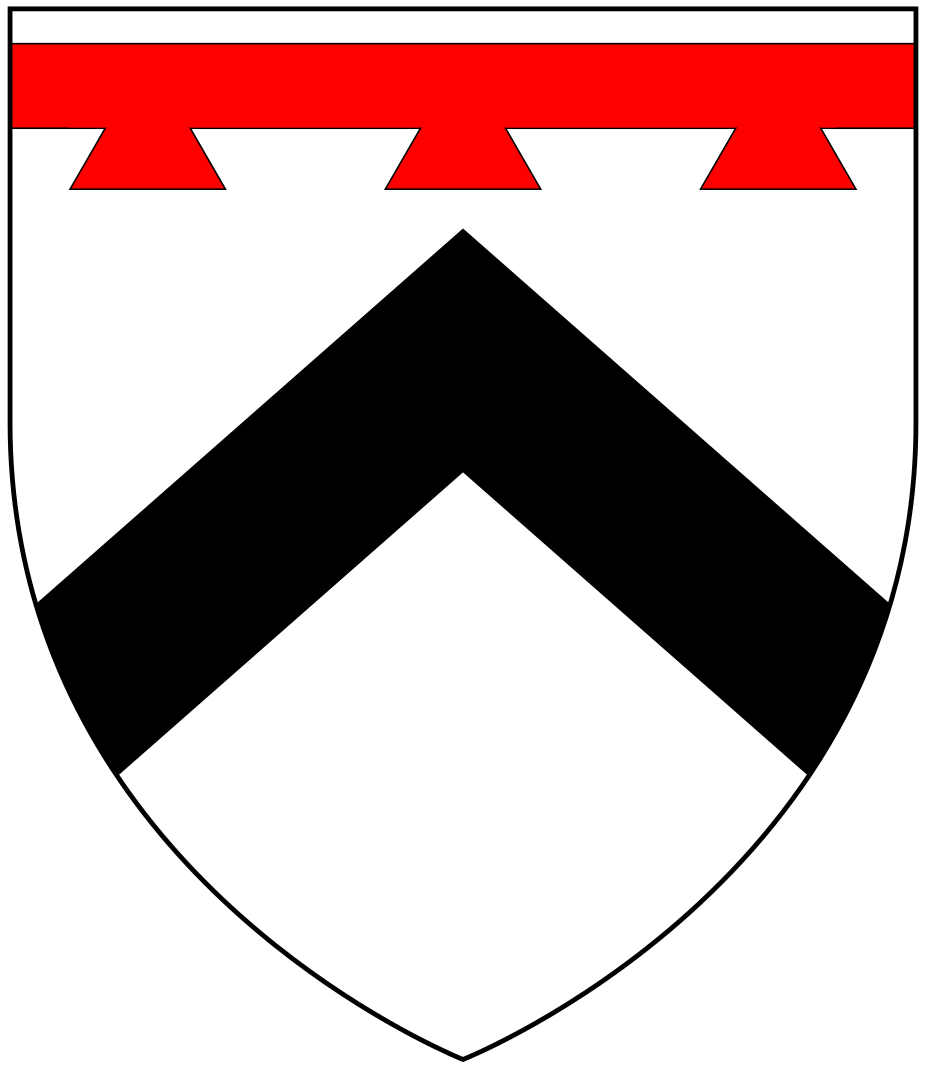
Arms of Prideaux: Argent, a chevron sable in chief a label of three points gules

John Prideaux (17 September 1578 – 29 July 1650) was an English academic and Bishop of Worcester.

== Early life ==
The fourth son of John and Agnes Prideaux, he was born at Stowford House in the parish of Harford, near Ivybridge, Devon, England, on 17 September 1578. His parents had to provide for a family of twelve; John, however, attracted the attention of a wealthy friend, Lady Fowell, of the same parish, and was sent to Oxford at eighteen. He matriculated from Exeter College on 14 October 1596, received a B.A. degree on 31 January 1600, was elected Fellow of Exeter College on 30 June 1601, and received a M.A. degree on 30 June 1603. The College was then under Thomas Holland as Rector and William Helme as tutor.

Prideaux took holy orders soon after 1603, and was appointed chaplain to Henry Frederick, Prince of Wales. Matthew Sutcliffe named him in 1609 one of the fellows of his Chelsea College.

== Rector and Regius Professor ==
Prideaux was admitted B.D. on 6 May 1611, and on 4 April 1612 he was elected Rector of Exeter College, Oxford and was permitted to take the degree of D.D. 30 May 1612, before the statutable period. Exeter was then fifth college numerically in the university, and attracted not only west-countrymen, but also foreign students. Prideaux built on its reputation for scholarship. Philip Cluverius and D. Orville the geographers, James Casaubon and Sixtinus Amama were among the Northern Europeans and others who studied under him. Robert Spottiswoode and James, Duke of Hamilton, were among his Scottish pupils. Prideaux added to the buildings of the college: a new chapel was built in 1624, and consecrated (5 October) with a sermon by him. Anthony Ashley Cooper, his pupil from 1636 to 1638, records that he could be just and kindly to excitable undergraduates. Another of his students was Dutch Reformed theologian Sixtinus Amama.

After the death of Prince Henry in 1612, Prideaux was appointed chaplain to the King. On 17 July 1614, he was collated to the vicarage of Bampton, Oxfordshire, and 8 December 1615 was appointed Regius Professor of Divinity at Oxford University in succession to Robert Abbot; to this office a canonry of Christ Church was annexed. He received subsequently the vicarage of Chalgrove, Oxfordshire, in 1620, a canonry in Salisbury Cathedral 17 June 1620, the rectory of Bladon in 1625, and the rectory of Ewelme, Oxfordshire, in 1629.

Prideaux was in post as Vice-Chancellor of Oxford University (a one-year position at the time) five times: from July 1619 to July 1621, July 1624 to 1626, and from 7 October 1641 to 7 February 1643, although in absentia at the end of his office. In his first year of office, he had to intervene in the dispute raging in Jesus College as to the election of a Principal. In defiance of the fellows, he installed Francis Mansell, the nominee of Lord Pembroke, then chancellor, and expelled most of the dissentients.

It was as Regius Professor of Divinity that Prideaux came most into contact with actual politics. For 26 years, he had to preside at theological disputations, in which the unorthodox found supporters. He maintained throughout a conservative position, without altogether alienating the extremists. To young Gilbert Sheldon, who first at Oxford denied that the Pope was Antichrist, he replied with a joke; and his quarrel with Peter Heylyn, whom in 1627 he denounced as a 'Bellarminian,' for maintaining the supremacy of the church in matters of faith, was amicably settled in 1633 by the mediation of William Laud. In 1617, a similar difficulty with Daniel Featley had been composed by the help of George Abbot. His attitude towards Arminian views was unfriendly. On the other hand, Laud respected him, and asked him in 1636 to revise William Chillingworth's Religion of Protestants, and he always remained one of the royal chaplains.

== Later life ==
Prideaux was one of the miscellaneous theologians summoned by the lords' committee 1 March 1641, to meet in the Jerusalem Chamber and discuss plans of church reform under the lead of John Williams. In the autumn Charles, in filling the five vacant sees, promoted four bishops and appointed Prideaux to the fifth, that of Worcester. Prideaux was consecrated on 19 December 1641, and installed a few weeks later; he was thus engaged at Worcester when Williams and his eleven colleagues assembled to make their protest, 29 December, and so escaped impeachment. He was one of the three peers, all bishops, who dissented when the bill for excluding the spiritual peers from parliament was read a third time, 5 February 1642. That the commons were not hostile to Prideaux was shown by his nomination as one of the Westminster Assembly in April 1642. He never attended any of its meetings, and, returning to Worcester, gradually identified himself with the royalists; so that in the list of the Assembly in the ordinance of June 1643 his name no longer appears.

He was deprived of his See by Parliament on 9 October 1646, as episcopacy was abolished for the duration of the Commonwealth and the Protectorate. He maintained himself in his diocese until the end of the war, and was in Worcester when the city capitulated to Thomas Rainsborough. Deprived of what remained to him of the episcopal estates, he sought a refuge with his son-in-law, Dr Henry Sutton, rector of Bredon, Worcestershire. His last years were spent in comparative poverty, and he had to sell his library to provide for his family. He died of fever at Bredon on 29 July 1650 and was buried in the chancel of the church there 15 August.

== Views ==
Described as one of the most influential Calvinists inside the Church, he was censured in 1631 for his tolerance of preachers in Oxford attacking William Laud.

He was widely disliked by the Laudian party in the Church of England. Richard Montagu, one of Laud's supporters, called him ‘that jackanapes’ and ‘the Bedlam of Exeter’, hardly complimentary things to say about one of Oxford's most renowned heads of house. There was an unusually high presence of staunch Protestants at Exeter, and its reputation as anti-Laudian was clear (it was the only college not to have its altar in the position required by the Laudian statutes). Prideaux's position at the apex of the College allowed his influence to permeate every aspect of its life, academic and religious, and Exeter's appeal as a centre of Protestant scholarship must have stemmed in large part from him.

== Works ==
Matthias Prideaux, a Royalist soldier, was his son, and predeceased him in 1646. John Prideaux edited his work on history.

He wrote a substantial academic treatise, Hypomnemata, as well as theological works.

== Sources ==
This article incorporates text from a publication now in the public domain: Hawke, E.G. (1896). "Prideaux, John (1578-1650)". In Lee, Sidney (ed.). Dictionary of National Biography. Vol. 46. London: Smith, Elder & Co. pp. 354=356.

Academic offices
Preceded by Thomas Holland	Rector of Exeter College, Oxford; 1612–1642	Succeeded by George Hakewill
Preceded by Robert Abbot	Regius Professor of Divinity at Oxford; 1615–1642	Succeeded by Robert Sanderson
Preceded by Edward Reynolds	Vice-Chancellor of Oxford University; 1619–1621	Succeeded by William Piers
Preceded by William Piers	Vice-Chancellor of Oxford University; 1624–1626	Succeeded by William Juxon
Preceded by Christopher Potter	Vice-Chancellor of Oxford University; 1641–1642/3	Succeeded by Robert Pincke/John Tolson
Church of England titles
Preceded by John Thornborough	Bishop of Worcester; 1641–1646	Succeeded by none until English Restoration then George Morley
