= Henry Layton =

British philosopher and theological writer

Henry Layton (1622–1705) was a minor British philosopher, theological writer, and contemporary of John Locke.

== Life ==
He was the eldest son of Francis Layton (died 23 August 1661, aged 84) of Rawdon, West Riding of Yorkshire. His father was one of the masters of the jewel-house to Charles I and Charles II. In accordance with his father's will, Layton built the chapel at Rawdon, a chapelry in the parish of Guiseley. He died at Rawdon on 18 October 1705, aged 83. By his wife Elizabeth (died 1702, aged 55), daughter of Nicholas Yarborough, he had no children.

== Works ==
Layton is remembered for his anonymous authorship of a series of pamphlets, printed between 1692 and 1704, on the question of the immortality of the soul, a doctrine which he rejected. He started writing on the topic in 1691 with short treatise of fifteen sheets, which was circulated in manuscript. A year's correspondence with a nearby minister ended in his being referred to Richard Bentley's second Boyle Lecture (4 April 1692). To this lecture Layton replied in his first published pamphlet. Bentley took no notice of it, but it was criticised five years later by a presbyterian divine, Timothy Manlove of Leeds. Another minister referred Layton to the Pneumatologia (1671) of John Flavel. Layton's original work had now grown to fifty pages. Ultimately he printed it at his own expense as A Search after Souls.

By 1697 he had impaired eyesight; Manlove's criticism, published in that year, was read to him by his amanuensis, Timothy Jackson, and he issued a reply. His pamphlets continued until the year before his death, restating his position that soul is a function of body, a view which he defends on physiological grounds, and harmonises with scripture. His authorship was little known. Caleb Fleming, who replied to his Search in 1758, thought it was the work of William Coward. Besides his printed tracts, Layton left theological manuscripts; his literary executor was his nephew, William Smith, rector of Melsonby, North Riding of Yorkshire.

Layton published the following, all anonymous:

- Observations upon a Sermon intituled, "A Confutation of Atheism," [1692?], pp. 19.
- A Search after Souls and Spiritual Operations in Man, [1693?] pp. 278.
- A Second Part of … A Search after Souls, [1694?], pp. 188 (consists in part of replies to letters of "a minister, eminent as scholar and teacher", who on 21 November 1693 advised him not to publish).
- Observations upon a Short Treatise … by … Timothy Manlove, intituled, "The Immortality of the Soul," [1697?], pp. 128.
- Observations upon Mr. Wadsworth's book of the Soul's Immortality, [1699?], pp. 215; deals with Thomas Wadsworth's Ἀντιψυχοθανασία, 1670; from p. 201 with The Immortality of the Humane Soul, 1659, by Walter Charleton.
- An Argument concerning the Humane Souls Separate Subsistance, [1699?], pp. 16 (Abbot).
- Arguments and Replies in a Dispute concerning the Nature of the Humane Soul, &c., London, 1703, pp. 112 (no publisher; deals with letters, dated 15 August and 14 September 1702; Francis Blackburne, in Hist. View, p. 305, identifies the writer with Henry Dodwell the elder; the tract is evidently meant as the first of the following series).
- Observations upon … "A Vindication of the Separate Existence of the Soul. …" By Mr. John Turner, lecturer of Christ Church, London, &c. [1703?], pp. 55 (Turner had written in 1702 against Coward).
- Observations upon Dr. Nicholl's … "Conference with a Theist," &c. [1703?], pp. 124 (against William Nicholls).
- Observations upon … "Vindiciæ Mentis," … 1702, &c. [1703?], pp. 88.
- Observations upon … "Psychologia" … by John Broughton, M.A. … 1703, [1703?], pp. 132.
- Observations upon … Broughton's Psychologia, Part Second, &c. [1703?], pp. 52.
- Observations upon … A Discourse … By Dr. Sherlock … 1704, &c. [1704?], pp. 115 (William Sherlock).

Almost all were collected (not reprinted) 1706, 2 vols., as A Search after Souls … By a Lover of Truth. Most of the copies were suppressed by Layton's executors, a few being deposited in public libraries and given to private friends.
