= Thomas Wadsworth =

English presbyterian minister

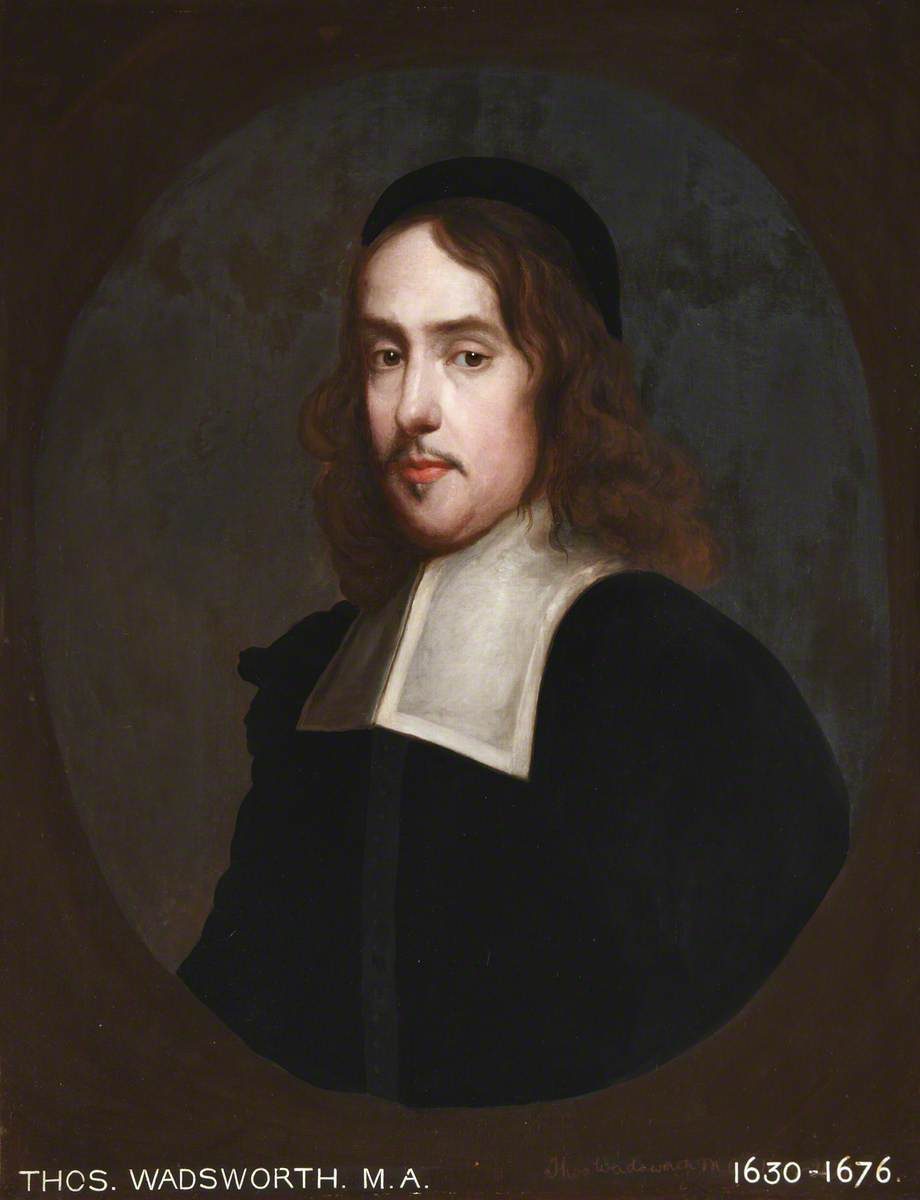
Thomas Wadsworth

Thomas Wadsworth (1630–1676) was an English presbyterian minister, an ejected nonconformist after 1662.

== Life ==
The son of Thomas Wadsworth, he was born in the parish of St. Saviour's, Southwark, on 15 December 1630. His father was close to Samuel Bolton, who held a lectureship at St Saviour's as well as being Master of Christ's College, Cambridge; and in 1647 Thomas entered Christ's College. There his tutors were Peter Harrison and William Owtram. He was scholarly, religiously inclined, and joined an academic club for philosophical study and devotional exercises.

Having graduated B.A. in 1650–1, Wadsworth was called home by his father's last illness. Elected Fellow in 1652 of Christ's, he graduated M.A. in 1654, and then resigned his fellowship on Bolton's advice, accepting a call to minister at St. Mary's, Newington Butts, Surrey. The rectory had been filled by Henry Langley on the sequestration of James Meggs; Langley was followed by John Morton, on whose death the parish was divided on the question of his successor; each section independently petitioned parliament in favour of Wadsworth, who was appointed on 16 February 1653. He was ordained by the eighth London classis in the church of St Mary Axe. He gained a reputation preacher and catechist.

On August 1660, after the English Restoration, Meggs claimed the living; Wadsworth resigned on 29 September. He retained a Saturday morning lectureship at St Antholin's, and a Monday evening lectureship at St Margaret, Fish Street Hill. The parishioners, who were the patrons of the perpetual curacy of St Laurence Pountney, presented him to that living, with a lectureship at St John the Baptist's. He held it till the Act of Uniformity 1662, preaching his farewell sermon on 23 August, the day before the act came into force.

Moving to Theobalds in the parish of Cheshunt, Hertfordshire, he preached privately there, and, also privately to a section of his old flock at Newington Butts, taking no salary. He continued his works during the plague of 1665. After the Great Fire of 1666 he preached in a timber building erected in Deadman's Place, Southwark, where he was assisted by Andrew Parsons (1616–1684). He still continued to reside and preach at Theobalds, where in 1669 he was returned as keeping a conventicle along with Robert Bragge (1627–1704), and where he took out a license (1 May 1672) under the Royal Declaration of Indulgence, as a presbyterian teacher in the house of Jonathan Pritman.

A few weeks before his death Wadsworth left Theobalds for a residence in Pickle Herring Stairs, Southwark. He died on Sunday, 29 October 1676. His funeral sermon was preached (12 November) by Robert Bragge; Richard Baxter took charge for some months of the Deadman's Place congregation.

== Works ==
Wadsworth's writings included:

- Ἀντιψυχοφαναία, or the Immortality of the Soul, 1670. This work was answered in detail by Henry Layton.
- Faith's Triumphs over the Fears of Death, 1670.
- Separation yet no Schism, 1675.
- Last Warning to secure Sinners, 1677 (his last two sermons; edited by Richard Baxter).
- Meditations on the Lord's Supper, 1680.
- Remains, with a Life and portrait.
- Self-Examination, 1687.

== Family ==
Wadsworth married, first, a younger daughter of Henry Hasting of Newington Butts; she died in childbed on 13 October 1661. He married, secondly (November 1663), Margaret (died 3 January 1668), daughter of Henry Gibs of Bristol, and widow of Thomas Sharp, merchant. He married, thirdly (1671), Anna, only daughter of Colonel Markham, by whom he had issue two sons (one of whom died in infancy), and two daughters. By his earlier marriages he had no surviving issue.

== Notes ==
Attribution

This article incorporates text from a publication now in the public domain: Lee, Sidney, ed. (1899). "Wadsworth, Thomas". Dictionary of National Biography. Vol. 58. London: Smith, Elder & Co.
