= Timothy Manlove =

English Presbyterian minister and physician

Timothy Manlove (1663–1699) was an English Presbyterian minister and physician. Dying young, he is now known as a supporter of the anti-materialist philosophy of Richard Bentley.

== Life ==
Son of Edward Manlove the poet, he was born at Ashbourne, Derbyshire. He was educated at a dissenting academy, the Sheriffhales school of John Woodhouse.

He was ordained at Attercliffe, near Sheffield, on 11 September 1688, and his first known settlement was in 1691, at Pontefract, Yorkshire, where he was popular. In 1694 he was invited to the charge of Mill Hill Chapel, Leeds; his ministry at Leeds was not supported well financially. He obtained some private practice as a physician. At first on good terms with Ralph Thoresby the antiquary, he quarrelled with him on the subject of nonconformity.

He moved in 1699 to Newcastle-on-Tyne as assistant to Richard Gilpin, but shortly died of a fever on 4 August 1699, in the prime of life, and was buried on 5 August. A funeral sermon, entitled The Comforts of Divine Love, was published by Gilpin in 1700.

== Works ==
He published:

- The Immortality of the Soul asserted. … With … Reflections on a … Refutation of … Bentley's “Sermon,” &c., 1697, (against Henry Layton);
- Præparatio Evangelica … Discourse concerning the Soul's Preparation for a Blessed Eternity, &c. 1698.

William Tong classes Manlove with Richard Baxter for his ‘clear, weighty way of writing.’

== Notes ==
Attribution

- "Manlove, Timothy" . Dictionary of National Biography. London: Smith, Elder & Co. 1885–1900.
