= Thnetopsychism =

Thnetopsychism, from the Greek thnētós ("mortal") and psūkhḗ ("soul") (also known as the doctrine of the whole death), is a view in Christian theology according to which death means the complete extinction of the human being, with no continuation of an immortal substance independent of bodily existence. The human being is therefore understood as an indivisible unity of body, soul, and spirit; with death, their existence ends entirely. The resurrection of the dead on the Last Day is understood as a complete re-creation of the human being through God's creative power—not as a revivification of a pre-existing core of the soul.

== Proponents ==
The whole-death theory is represented, among others, by the theologians Paul Althaus, Oscar Cullmann, Carl Stange, and Werner Elert, as well as by the process philosopher Charles Hartshorne. It is found in several religious communities, such as the Seventh-day Adventist Church, the Christadelphians and Jehovah's Witnesses.

== See also ==
- Christian mortalism
- Eternal oblivion
