= Hugh Lloyd (headmaster) =

Hugh Lloyd (1546–1601) was a Welsh headmaster of Winchester College.

== Life ==
Born in Lleyn, Carnarvonshire, he was the brother of John Lloyd (1558–1603) the classical scholar. He entered Winchester College in 1560. Proceeding to New College, Oxford, he was admitted probationary fellow on 5 January 1562, and perpetual fellow in 1564. He graduated B.A. in 1566, B.C.L. in 1570, and D.C.L. in 1588.

Lloyd resigned his fellowship in 1578, on being appointed chancellor of Rochester Cathedral; in 1579 he was presented to the vicarage of Charlbury, Oxfordshire, and was master ("informator") of Winchester from 1580 to 1587. On 12 November 1584 he was made prebendary of St Paul's Cathedral, and in 1588 became rector of Islip, near Oxford.

Lloyd died on 17 October 1601, and was buried in New College outer chapel.

== Works ==
Lloyd compiled Phrases elegantiores ex Cæsaris Commentariis, Cicerone, aliisque, in usum Scholæ Winton. (Dictata), 2 pts., published Oxford, 1654, and edited by John Lamphire.
