= Miles Grant =

American Adventist preacher

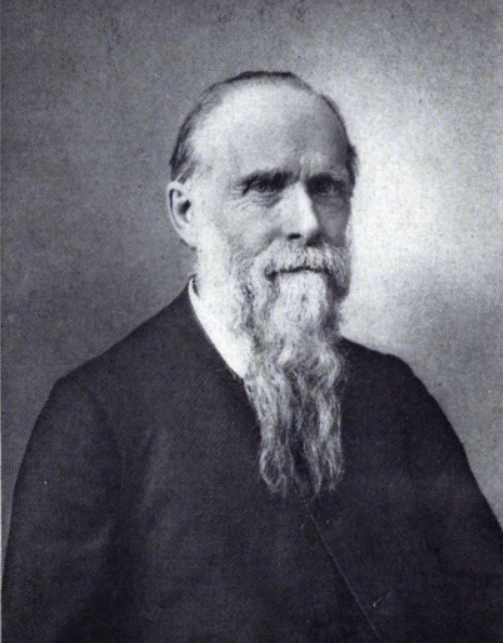
- Born: 13 December 1819; Torrington, Connecticut
- Died: 24 March 1911 (aged 91); Los Angeles
- Occupation: Preacher

Rev. Miles Grant (13 December 1819 – 24 March 1911) was an American Adventist preacher and teacher at Amenia Seminary. He was an advocate of conditional immortality and author of Positive Theology in 1895.

== Career ==
Grant was born in Torrington, Connecticut in 1819. As a teenager he spent much time in hard farm labor until he became a school teacher at Winchester, then Wolcottville and Winsted for several years. He was also employed as a teacher at Amenia Seminary and Jonesville Academy in New York.

He became a Christian in 1842 after attending lectures by H. A. Chittenden and began preaching with S. G. Mathewson in 1850. He held pastorate in Boston between 1855 and 1858. He was the editor of The World’s Crisis and Second Advent Messenger from 1856 to 1876. Miles became convinced that only the righteous were awarded eternal life and the Bible does not teach immortality of the soul as after death man lies in a state of unconscious; a dreamless sleep until the resurrection.

During the late 19th-century there was rivalry between Advent Christians and Seventh-day Adventists. Grant was a fierce opponent of Ellen G. White and the Seventh-day Adventist Church.

== Vegetarianism ==
Grant was described as a "vegetarian clergyman". He gave up hunting at the age of twenty-one and came to view fishing and hunting as cruel sports. He became a strict vegetarian in 1853 for ethical and religious reasons. He also gave up coffee, tea, salt, spices and pastry. In 1865, he stated that he was never sick and his "mind is always clear and active, is always happy and contented". He lived on a diet of apples, beans, vegetables, cheese, milk, Graham bread, raw eggs, raisins, nuts, oatmeal and potatoes. He preferred two meals a day.

== Selected publications ==
- Spiritualism Unveiled and Shown to be the Work of Demons. Boston. 1866.
- Positive Theology. Boston. 1895.
