= John Lamphire =

John Lamphire M.D. (1614–1688) was an English academic, who became a physician after being ejected from his college fellowship. He was later Camden Professor of Ancient History, and principal of Hart Hall, Oxford.

== Life ==
He was son of George Lamphire, apothecary, and was born in Winchester. He was admitted scholar of Winchester College in 1627. He matriculated from New College, Oxford in 1634, aged 20; was elected fellow there in 1636; proceeded B. A. in 1638, and M.A. in 1641–2. He is apparently the John Lanfire who was appointed prebendary of Bath and Wells in 1641.

In 1648 he was ejected from his fellowship by the parliamentary visitors, but during the Commonwealth practised physic with some success at Oxford. Anthony à Wood in his 'Autobiography' says he belonged to a set of royalists "who esteemed themselves virtuosi or wits". He was Wood's physician, and tried to cure his deafness.

Lamphire was restored to his fellowship in 1660, and on 16 August was elected Camden professor of history. On 30 October 1660 he was created M.D. On 8 Sept. 1662 he succeeded Christopher Rogers (deprived) as principal of New Inn Hall, and on 30 May 1668 was translated to the headship of Hart Hall. He was also a justice of the peace for the city and county of Oxford, and seems to have taken some part in civic affairs, particularly in the paving of St. Clement's and the draining of the town moat. He died on 30 March 1688. aged 76, and was buried on 2 April in the chapel of Hart Hall (now Hertford College), near the west door. Walker calls him "a good, generous, and fatherly man, of a public spirit, and free from the modish hypocrisy of the age he lived in".

== Works ==
Lamphire had a good collection of books and manuscripts, but some of them were burnt in April 1650 by a fire in his house. He owned thirty-eight manuscripts of the works of Thomas Lydiat, which he had bound in twenty-two volumes, and he published one of them, Canones Chronologici (Oxford, 1675), He also published two works by Dr. Hugh Lloyd, the grammarian, in one volume, entitled Phrases Elegantiores et Dictata, Oxford, 1654 (Bodleian). To the second edition (1661) of his friend John Masters's Monarchia Britannica, an oration given in New College Chapel on 6 April 1642 (1st edition 1661), Lamphire added an oration by Henry Savile. He is also said to have published Quaestiones in Logica, Ethica, et Metaphysica (Oxford, 1680) by Robert Pink or Pinck, and he edited Henry Wotton's Plausus et Vota ad Regem de Scotia reducem in Monarchia (Oxford, 1681). He was an executor to Jasper Mayne, and with Robert South put a stone over his grave in Christ Church Cathedral.
