= Emmanuel Pétavel-Olliff =

Dr. Emmanuel Pétavel-Olliff (1836–1910) was a Swiss pastor and biblical scholar.

He was son of Abram-François Pétavel (1791–1870), Neuchâtel pastor, pro-Jewish writer and author of the poem La fille de Sion; ou, le rétablissement d'Israël (1850)

Pétavel-Olliff wrote an early history of the Bible in France (1864). In 1866 Pétavel-Olliff formed a society in Paris for the publication of a new ecumenical French translation of the Bible which was to include Protestant, Catholic, Jewish and independent scholars. Originally the project had government support and the participation of Catholic scholars, but by the second conference in Paris in 1867 the Catholic scholars had withdrawn and the project was abandoned.

In England Pétavel-Olliff was mainly known for the translation of La fin du mal which presented a Protestant case for conditional immortality.

== Works ==
- La fin du Mal Vol.1 The Struggle for Eternal Life; Or the Immortality of the Just, and the Gradual Extinction of the Wicked.
- Le problème de l'immortalité Vol.2 translated into English as The Problem of Immortality; with a prefatory letter by Charles Secrétan. Translation by F. A. Freer. London. 1892.
- La Bible en France ou Les traductions françaises des saintes Écritures Libraire francaise et etrangere, Paris, 1864.
- La Loi du progrès 1869
- l'Egalité chrétienne 1869
- "Redeem the Time"
- Appel aux Chrétiens Boers 1901; Le droit des Anglais dans La guerre du Transvaal et les conditions de la paix. Par un vieux Suisse 1900; "Voice of Alarm"
- Le plan de Dieu dans l'evolution: étude sur l'evolutionnisme Chrétien 1902
- God's Plan in Evolution (1914)
