= Stephen Lloyd Cook =

American biblical scholar

Stephen Cook serves as the Catherine N. McBurney Professor of Old Testament Language and Literature at Virginia Theological Seminary, the largest of the accredited seminaries of the Episcopal Church.

== Career ==
Prior to joining the VTS faculty in 1996, Cook served on the faculty of Union Theological Seminary at Columbia University in New York City for four years. He did his doctoral training in Old Testament at Yale University after having completing the M.Div. degree at Yale's Divinity School, where he also served as an instructor and fellow. His undergraduate work was at Trinity College, Hartford, Connecticut, where he graduated with honors as a religion major in 1984.

Cook has served in several capacities as an officer of the Society of Biblical Literature, most recently as a Regional Coordinator for the guild. He is also the Corporation Representative for Virginia Seminary to the American Schools of Oriental Research and a member of such other professional societies as the Anglican Association of Biblical Scholars and the Catholic Biblical Association. He has been in high demand around the country as a lecturer, seminar speaker, and workshop leader.

== Family ==
He and his wife Catherine, a psychotherapist, live amid the seminary community on its campus in Alexandria, Virginia, with their daughter.

== Books published ==
- Conversations with Scripture: 2 Isaiah (Anglican Association of Biblical Scholars Study Series; Harrisburg, Pa.: Morehouse, 2008)
- New Proclamation: Year B, 2008-2009(Fortress, 2008)
- The Apocalyptic Literature (IBT; Abingdon, 2003)
- The Social Roots of Biblical Yahwism (Society of Biblical Literature, 2004)
- Prophecy and Apocalypticism (Fortress, 1995)
- Ezekiel's Hierarchical World: Wrestling with a Tiered Reality (SBL Symposium Series, 2004)
- The Whirlwind: Essays on Job, Hermeneutics, and Theology in Memory of Jane Morse (JSOTSup 336; Sheffield, 2002)
- On the Way to Nineveh: Studies in Honor of George M. Landes (ASOR, 1999)

== Awards, grants and fellowships ==
- Suzanne F. Thomas Faculty Research Award, Virginia Theological Seminary (2006)
- Conant Grant for Sabbatical Research from the Episcopal Church, United States (2003)
- Dr. Cook's Prophecy and Apocalypticism named an Outstanding Book of the Year by Choice (1997)
- The Leonard Hastings Schoff Publication Fund Grant (1992)
