= William Coward =

English physician, writer and poet

William Coward (1657?–1725) was an English physician, controversial writer, and poet. He is now remembered for his sceptical writings on the soul, which Parliament condemned as blasphemous and ordered to be burned in his presence.

== Life ==
He was born at Winchester in 1656 or 1657. His mother was sister of John Lamphire, principal of Hart Hall, Oxford. In May 1674 Coward was admitted as a commoner of Hart Hall; and in 1675 a scholar of Wadham College. He proceeded B.A. in 1677, and in January 1679-1680 was elected fellow of Merton College.

In 1682 he published a Latin version of John Dryden's Absalom and Achitophel (1681). It was eclipsed by a contemporary version published by Francis Atterbury, and Coward was ridiculed. In 1683 Coward became M.A., in 1685 M.B., and in 1687 M.D. He practised in Northampton; and in 1693 or 1694 settled in Lombard Street, London, having to leave Northampton in consequence of immorality, according to Thomas Hearne.

Coward left London about 1705, and in 1718 was residing at Ipswich, whence in 1722 he wrote to Sir Hans Sloane, offering to submit an epitaph upon the Duke of Marlborough to the duchess, who was said to have offered £500 for such a performance. He was admitted a candidate of the College of Surgeons on 5 July 1695, and remained in that position till 1725, when the absence of his name from the lists proves that he must have been dead.

== Controversial writings ==
In 1702 Coward published, under the pseudonym "Estibius Psychalethes", Second Thoughts concerning Human Soul, demonstrating the notion of human soul as believed to be a spiritual, immortal substance united to a human body to be a plain heathenish invention ... the ground of many absurd and superstitious opinions, abominable to the reformed churches and derogatory in general to true Christianity. His argument was possibly suggested by John Locke's speculation as to the possibility that a power of thinking might be 'superadded' to matter. He maintains, partly upon scriptural arguments, that there is no such thing as a separate soul, but that immortal life will be conferred upon the whole man at the resurrection.

Replies were made in William Nichols's Conference with a Theist, John Turner's Vindication of the Separate Existence of the Soul, and John Broughton's Psychologia. Locke, in letters to Anthony Collins, speaks contemptuously both of the Psychologia and of Coward's next work, The Grand Essay; or a Vindication of Reason and Religion against Impostures of Philosophy, to which was appended an Epistolary reply to the Psychologia. After the publication of this, a complaint was made in the House of Commons, 10 March 1704. A committee was appointed to examine Coward's books. Coward was called to the bar and professed his readiness to recant anything contrary to religion or morality.

The house voted that the books contained offensive doctrines, and ordered them to be burnt by the common hangman. The proceeding increased the notoriety of Coward's books; and in the same year he published another edition of the Second Thoughts. In 1706 (apparently) appeared The Just Scrutiny; or a serious enquiry into the modern notions of the soul.

Henry Dodwell's Epistolary Discourse, &c. in support of the natural mortality of the soul, appeared in 1706, and led to a controversy with Samuel Clarke and Anthony Collins. Coward distinguishes his own position from Dodwell's and attacks Clarke.

In 1706 Coward also published his Ophthalmoiatria, chiefly medical, but in which he ridicules the Cartesian notion of an immaterial soul residing in the pineal gland. Sir Hans Sloane corrected the proofs, and that in spite of Sloane's remonstrances Coward declined to conceal his opinions. Jonathan Swift and other contemporaries frequently ridicule Coward in company with John Toland, Collins, and other deists.

== Other works ==
Coward published two poetical works, The Lives of Abraham, Isaac, and Jacob, an heroic poem (1705), which seems to have disappeared; and Licentia Poetica discussed ... to which are added critical observations on . . . Homer, Horace, Virgil, Milton, Cowley, Dryden, &c. (1709). Commendatory verses by Aaron Hill and John Gay are prefixed. It is a didactic performance in the taste of the day, with an apparatus of preface, notes, and political appendix. His medical works are : 1. De Fermento volatili nutritivo conjectura rationis, &c. (1695)). 2. Alcali Vindicatium (1698). 3. Remediorum Medicinalium Tabula (1704). 4. Ophthalmoiatria, &c. (1706).
