= Gottfried Fritschel =

Gottfried William Leonhard Fritschel (Nuremberg, December 19, 1836 – 1889) was a German-born Lutheran who emigrated to Iowa. His father was Martin Fritschel a minister, his brother Conrad Sigmund Fritschel (1833–1900) was a professor at Wartburg College, and his son George J. Fritschel, also became a professor at Dubuque.

== Works ==
- Luther und offene Fragen - in Zeitschrift für die gesammte lutherische Theologie und Kirche Iowa, 1867
