= Robert Pink =

English clergyman and academic administrator

- Born: 1573
- Died: 2 November 1647 (aged 73–74)
- Education: New College, Oxford
- Occupations: Clergyman, academic
- Known for: Supporter of William Laud; Warden of New College, Oxford

Robert Pink D.D. (Pinck, Pincke, Pinke) (1573 – 2 November 1647) was an English clergyman and academic, a supporter of William Laud as Warden of New College, Oxford, and later a royalist imprisoned by Parliament.

== Life ==
Robert Pink was the eldest son of Henry Pink of Kempshott in the parish of Winslade, Hampshire, by his second wife, Elizabeth, daughter of John Page of Sevington, and was baptised on 1 March 1573. He was admitted to Winchester College in 1588, and matriculated at New College, Oxford, on 14 June 1594, aged 19. He was elected Fellow in 1596, graduated BA on 27 April 1598, and MA on 21 January 1602.

In 1610, Pink became proctor, and in 1612 Bachelor of Medicine. In 1617, he was elected Warden of New College, and two years later, 26 June 1619, was admitted to the degrees of BD and DD From 1620, he was rector of Stanton St John, Oxfordshire, and perhaps of Colerne, Wiltshire, in 1645.

Pink was a close ally of Laud in his measures for the reorganisation of Oxford University, and was one of the committee of delegates charged to draw up the new statutes. In July 1634, Laud nominated Pink to succeed Brian Duppa as Vice-Chancellor and reappointed him again for a second year. In 1639, Pink assisted the Vice-Chancellor in suppressing superfluous alehouses.

At the outbreak of the First English Civil War, John Prideaux, then Vice-Chancellor of Oxford University, left Oxford without resigning his office. Convocation appointed Pink to discharge the Vice-Chancellor's duties as Pro-Vice-Chancellor, or deputy Vice-Chancellor. Pink began to inquire into the condition of the arms in the possession of the different colleges and to drill the scholars. On 25 August 1642 he held a review in New College quad and proceeded to raise defences, and to attempt to persuade the city to co-operate with the university in erecting fortifications. William Fiennes, 1st Viscount Saye and Sele, and other adherents of Parliament then collected forces at Aylesbury and threatened an attack on Oxford. Pink went to confer with the parliamentary commanders, and was sent by them to London to answer to Parliament. Before leaving he appealed to Oxford University's Chancellor, Philip Herbert, 4th Earl of Pembroke, to protect it. The House of Commons kept him for a time under arrest, and on 17 November. ordered that he should be confined at Winchester House. On 5 January 1643, he was ordered to be released on bail.

By 1644, Pink was back in Oxford, finding rooms and employment as chaplains for Isaac Barrow and Peter Gunning, who had been expelled from Cambridge for refusing the covenant. He died on 2 November 1647 and was buried in New College chapel. In 1677, Ralph Brideoake erected a monument for him on the west wall of the outer chapel. Pink was a benefactor of New College and also of Winchester College. A small collection of verses in his honour was published in 1648, containing poems by James Howell and others.

== Works ==
Pink was the author of Quaestiones Selectiores in Logica, Ethica, Physica, Metaphysica inter authores celebriores repertae, (1680), published by John Lamphire. It was a selection of extracts on scholastic philosophy, up to Francisco Suárez. The material was still current for use in Oxford disputations of the period.

== Sources ==
- This article incorporates text from a publication now in the public domain: Firth, Charles (1896). "Pinck, Robert". In Lee, Sidney (ed.). Dictionary of National Biography. Vol. 45. London: Smith, Elder & Co. pp. 308–310.

Academic offices
Preceded by Arthur Lake	Warden of New College, Oxford; 1617–1647	Succeeded by Henry Stringer
Preceded by Brian Duppa	Vice-Chancellor of Oxford University; 1634–1636	Succeeded by Richard Baylie
Preceded by John Tolson	Vice-Chancellor of Oxford University; 1643–1645	Succeeded by Samuel Fell
