= Louis Burnier =

Swiss pastor and author

Louis Burnier (1795–1873) was a Swiss pastor and writer of educational and religious works. He was pastor at Lutry, Lucens, Cossonay, Vich, Rolle and Morges.

== Works ==
- Études Élémentaires Et Progressives de la Parole de Dieu (Lausanne, 1847–1852) 9 vols.
- Histoire littéraire de l'Education morale et religieuse en France et dans la Suisse romande
