= Christian conditionalism =

Concept in Christian theology

In Christian theology, conditionalism or conditional immortality is the belief that the human soul is not naturally immortal and that immortality (“eternal life”) is a gift given to Christians by God through faith in Jesus Christ. This concept is related to soul sleep. This viewpoint stands in contrast to the more popular concept of the "natural immortality" of the soul. Conditionalism is practically synonymous with annihilationism, the belief that the unsaved will be ultimately destroyed.

== Protestantism ==
The British Evangelical Alliance ACUTE report states that conditionalism is a "significant minority evangelical view" that has "grown within evangelicalism in recent years". In the 20th century, conditional immortality was considered by certain theologians in the Eastern Orthodox Church.

Proponents of conditional immortality ("conditionalists") point to Genesis 2 and Revelation 22, where the Tree of Life is mentioned. It is argued that these passages, along with Genesis 3:22–24 teach that human beings will naturally die without continued access to God's life-giving power.

As a general rule, conditionalism goes hand in hand with annihilationism; that is, the belief that the souls of the wicked will be destroyed. The two ideas are not exactly equivalent, however, because in principle God may annihilate a soul which was previously created immortal. While annihilationism places emphasis on the active destruction of a person, conditionalism places emphasis on a person's dependence upon God for life; the extinction of the person is thus a passive consequence of separation from God.

In secular historical analysis, the doctrine of conditional immortality reconciles the ancient Hebrew view that humans are mortal with the Christian view that the saved will live forever.

Belief in forms of conditionalism became a current in Protestantism beginning with the Reformation, but it was only adopted as a formal teaching tenet by denominations such as early Unitarians, the churches of the English Dissenting Academies, then Seventh-day Adventists, Christadelphians, the Bible Students and Jehovah's Witnesses.

Moralist writers, such as Thomas Hobbes in Leviathan, have often argued that the doctrine of natural (or innate) immortality stems not from Hebrew thought as presented in the Bible, but rather from pagan influence, particularly Greek philosophy and the teachings of Plato, or Christian tradition. Bishop of Durham N.T. Wright noted that 1 Timothy 6:15–16 teaches "God... alone is immortal," while in 2 Timothy 1:10 it says that immortality only comes to human beings as a gift through the gospel. Immortality is something to be sought after (Romans 2:7) therefore it is not inherent to all humanity.
