= Harper's Bible Dictionary =

Scholarly reference book of the Bible

- Author: Paul J. Achtemeier
- Language: English
- Subject: Bible studies
- Genre: Non-fiction
- Publisher: Harper and Row
- Publication date: 1985
- Publication place: United States
- Media type: Print (Hardback)
- ISBN: 0-06-069863-2
- OCLC: 12262764
- Dewey Decimal: 220.3 19
- LC Class: BS440 .H237 1985

Harper's Bible Dictionary is a scholarly reference book of the Bible, containing the texts of the Old Testament, the Apocrypha, and the New Testament. It is written by 180 members of the Society of Biblical Literature, edited by Paul J. Achtemeier, and containing 3500 articles and 400 photographs.

It has a LCC of BS 440.H237.
