= Philip Monotropos =

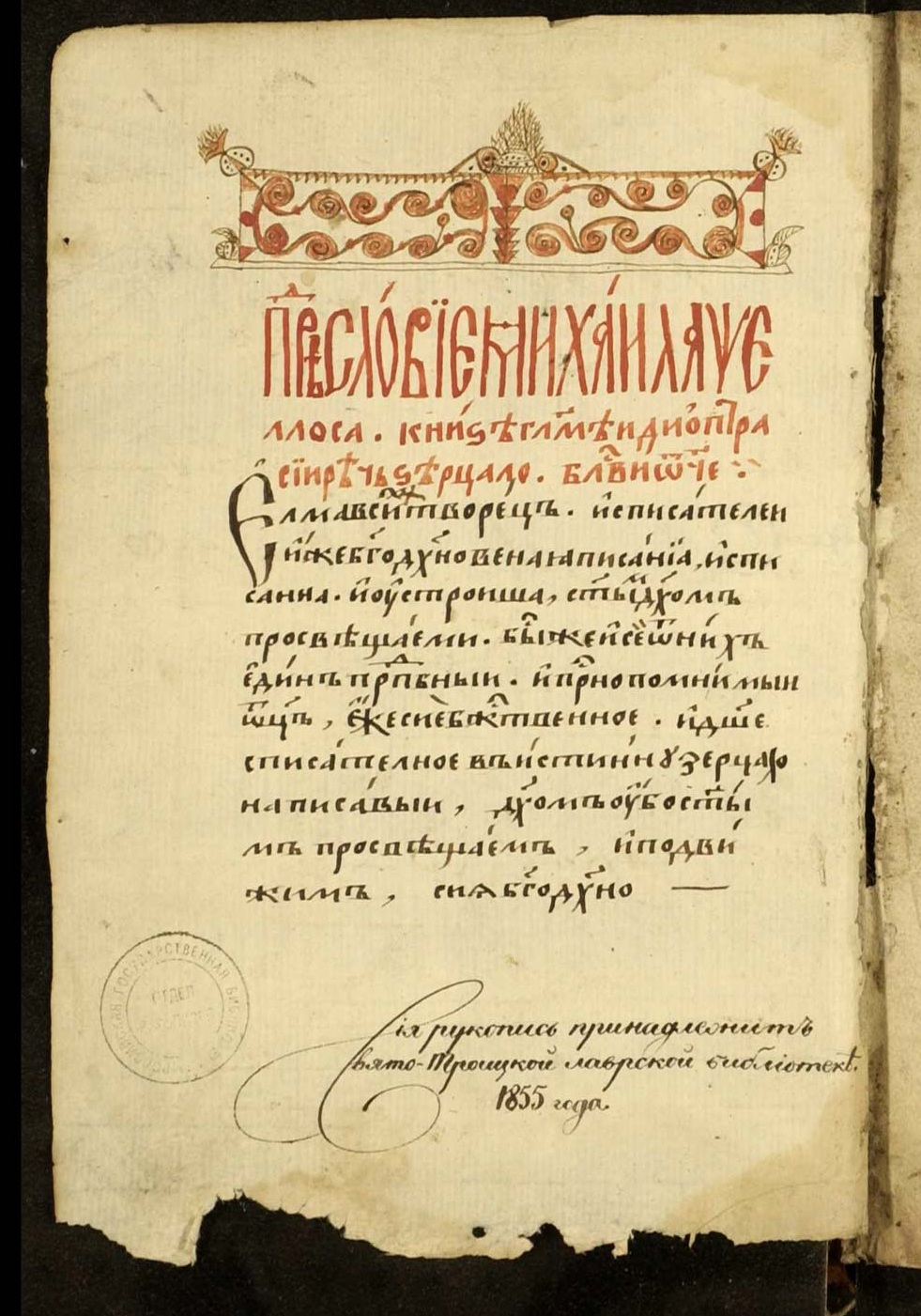
Library of Trinity Lavra of St. Sergius, the manuscript, number 191. (1816.) Dioptra, Philip philosopher, semi-uncial, written in 1471, a quarter of 230 sheets, the start of registration made in the 17th century.

Phillipos Monotropos or Philippus Solitarius ("Phillip the Recluse"; Ancient Greek: Φίλιππος ο Μονότροπος; fl. c. 1080) was a Byzantine monk and writer, notable for his authorship of the Dioptra ("The Mirror"), written towards the end of the eleventh century.

Philip probably lived on Mount Athos. The five-volume Dioptra is a compendium of prose and verse intended to educate the next generation. In the first volume, a sinful monk repents to his soul. In the following four volumes, a dialogue continues between the body and the soul.
