= List of Christian theologians =

This is a list of notable Christian theologians, listed chronologically by century of birth.

== 1st century ==
- Apostle Paul of Tarsus (died c. 60–65)
- Papias of Hierapolis (c. 60 – c. 130)
- Apostle James, Son of Zebedee
- Apostle Simon Peter
- Apostle John, Son of Zebedee
- Deacon Philip
- Deacon Stephen the Protomartyr
- Ignatius of Antioch (c. 35 or 50 – between 98 and 117)
- Polycarp (c. 69 – c. 155)
- Clement of Rome (fl. c. 96)

== 2nd century ==
- Valentinus (c. 100 – c. 160)
- Quadratus of Athens (fl. 124/125)
- Basilides (died c. 132)
- Aristides the Athenian (died c. 133 or fl. c. 140)
- Aristo of Pella (fl. c. 140)
- Marcion (c. 110 – c. 160)
- Justin Martyr (c. 110 – c. 165)
- Hegesippus (c. 110 – 180)
- Melito of Sardis (died c. 180)
- Athenagoras of Athens (c. 133 – c. 190)
- Dionysius of Corinth (fl. c. 171)
- Heracleon (fl. c. 175)
- Apollinaris Claudius (fl. c. 177)
- Ptolemy (fl. c. 180)
- Pantaenus (died c. 200)
- Irenaeus of Lyons (died c. 202)
- Apollonius of Ephesus (fl. c. 180 – c. 210)
- Serapion of Antioch (died 211)
- Clement of Alexandria (c. 150 – 211 or 216)
- Bardaisan (154–222/3)
- Tertullian (c. 160 – c. 220)
- Origen (c. 184 – c. 253)

== 3rd century ==
- Minucius Felix (2nd or 3rd century)
- Caius, Presbyter of Rome (early 3rd century)
- Hippolytus of Rome (c. 170 – c. 236)
- Origen of Alexandria (c. 184 – 254)
- Sabellius (fl. c. 215)
- Cyprian (c. 200 – c. 258)
- Novatian (c. 200 – 258)
- Paul of Samosata (c. 200 – c. 275)
- Dionysius of Alexandria (died 265)
- Gregory Thaumaturgus (c. 213 – c. 270)
- Methodius of Olympus (died c. 311)
- Lucian of Antioch (c. 240 – 312)
- Lactantius (c. 240 – c. 320)
- Arius (256 – 336)
- Aphrahat (ܐܦܪܗܛ, c. 280 – c. 345)
- Athanasius of Alexandria (296–373)

== 4th century ==
- Ephrem the Syrian (c. 306–373)
- Hilary of Poitiers (c. 310 – c. 367)
- Arnobius of Sicca (died c. 330)
- Basil of Caesarea (c. 330 – 379)
- Gregory of Nyssa (c. 330 – c. 395)
- Gregory Nazianzus (329–389)
- Evagrius Ponticus (345-399)
- Ambrose (337/340 – 397)
- John Chrysostom (c. 347–407)
- Jerome (347–420)
- Augustine (354–430)
- Eutyches (c. 375–454)
- Cyril of Alexandria (c. 376 – 444)
- Nestorius (c. 386 – c. 451)

== 5th century ==
- Annianus of Alexandria (fl. 5th c.)
- Basil of Cilicia (fl. 5th c.)
- Isaac of Antioch (fl. 5th c.)
- Peter the Iberian (c. 417–491)
- Boethius (c. 477–525)
- Leontius of Byzantium (485–543)
- Leontius of Jerusalem (c. 485–c. 543)

== 6th century ==
- Eusebius of Alexandria (fl. 6th c.)
- John of Caesarea (fl. 6th c.)
- John of Scythopolis (c. 536–550)
- Gregory the Great (540–604)
- John Moschus (c. 550–619)
- Isidore of Seville (c. 560–636)
- Sophronius of Jerusalem (c. 560–638)
- Andreas of Caesarea (563–614)
- Maximus the Confessor (c. 580–662)
- Eustratius of Constantinople (fl. 582–602)
- Theodore of Raithu (fl. late 6th or early 7th c.)
- Timothy of Constantinople (fl. late 6th or early 7th c.)

== 7th century ==
- Bede (672/673–735)
- John of Damascus (c. 675–749)
- Isaac of Nineveh (died c. 700)

== 8th century ==
- George Syncellus (died after 810)
- Theodore the Studite (759–826)
- Paschasius Radbertus (785–865)
- Joannicius the Great (762–846)

== 9th century ==
- Claudius of Turin (died 839)
- Gottschalk of Orbais (808-878)
- Ratramnus of Corbia (died 868)
- Johannes Scotus Eriugena (810–877)
- Saint Methodius (815–885)
- Photios I of Constantinople (c. 815–893)
- Saint Cyril (826/27–869)
- Leo Choirosphaktes (died c. 919)
- Nicholas I Mystikos (852–925)
- Arethas of Caesarea (c. 860 - c. 939)

== 10th century ==
- Theodore Daphnopates (fl. 10th c.)
- Athanasius the Athonite (c. 920 – c. 1003)
- Arnulf of Orleans (died 1003)
- Philip Monotropos (fl. c. 1080)
- Oecumenius (fl. c. 990)
- Berengar of Tours (999–1088)

== 11th century ==
- John the Deacon (fl. 11th c.)
- Leo of Ohrid (died 1056)
- Yahya of Antioch (died c. 1066)
- Niketas Stethatos (c. 1005–c. 1090)
- Anselm (1033–1109)
- Joannes Zonaras (c. 1070–c. 1140)
- Peter Abelard (1079–1142)
- Bernard of Clairvaux (1090–1153)
- Peter Lombard (c. 1096–1159)
- Hildegard of Bingen (1098–1179)

== 12th century ==
- Constantine Chrysomalus (fl. 12th c.)
- Constantine Stilbes (fl. 12th c.)
- Neilos Doxapatres (fl. 12th c.)
- Euthymios Zigabenos (died after 1118)
- Nicholas of Methone (died 1160/1166)
- Theorianos (died 1173)
- Andronikos Kamateros (c. 1110–c. 1180)
- Hugo Etherianus (1115–1182)
- Eustathius of Thessalonica (c. 1115–c. 1195/6)
- Michael Glykas (born c. 1130)
- Peter Waldo (c. 1140–1205)
- Saint Sava (1169 or 1174–1235)
- Dominic de Guzman (1170–1221)
- Francis of Assisi (c. 1181–1226)
- Nikephoros Blemmydes (1197–1272)

== 13th century ==
- Nikephoros the Monk (fl. 13th c.)
- Albertus Magnus (c. 1200–1280)
- Bonaventure (1221–1274)
- Thomas Aquinas (1225–1274)
- John XI Bekkos (c. 1225–1297)
- Peter Quesnel (died 1299)
- George Pachymeres (1242–c. 1310)
- Theoleptos of Philadelphia (c. 1250–1322)
- Constantine Akropolites (died c. 1324)
- Nikephoros Choumnos (c. 1253–1327)
- Maximus Planudes (c. 1260–c. 1305)
- Meister Eckhart (1260–1328)
- Scotus Johannes Duns (c. 1265 – c. 1308)
- George Moschabar (fl. c. 1270–1280)
- Matthew of Ephesus (1272/3–1355/7)
- William of Ockham (1285–1347)
- Neilos Kabasilas (c. 1290–1363)
- Irene Choumnaina Palaiologina (1291–c. 1355)
- Nicephorus Gregoras (c. 1295 – c. 1360)
- Gregory Palamas (1296–1359)

== 14th century ==
- Dionigi di Borgo San Sepolcro (1300–1342)
- Gregory Akindynos (c. 1300 – 1348)
- Bridget of Sweden (1303–1373)
- Nicholas Kabasilas (c. 1319/23–c. 1392)
- Theodore Meliteniotes (c. 1320–1393)
- John Wycliffe (c.1323–1384)
- Demetrios Kydones (1324–1398)
- Catherine of Siena (1347–1380)
- Joseph Bryennios (c. 1350–1431/38)
- Arsenius of Tyre (fl. 1351–1376)
- Manuel Kalekas (died 1410)
- Jan Hus (c. 1369–1415)
- Euthymius II of Constantinople (died 1416)
- Thomas à Kempis (1380–1471)

== 15th century ==
- Gennadius Scholarius (c. 1400–c. 1472)
- Nicholas of Cusa (1401–1464)
- Desiderius Erasmus (1469–1536)
- Martin Luther (1483–1546)
- Huldrych Zwingli (1484–1531)
- Thomas Cranmer (1489–1556)
- Thomas Müntzer (c. 1489–1525)
- Martin Bucer (1491–1551)
- Ignatius of Loyola (c. 1491–1556)
- Menno Simons (1496–1561)
- Philip Melanchthon (1497–1560)

== 16th century ==
- Alexander Alesius (1500–1565)
- John of Avila (1500–1569)
- Heinrich Bullinger (1504–1575)
- John Calvin (1509–1564)
- Michael Servetus (1511–1553)
- John Knox (c. 1513–1572)
- Teresa of Avila (1515–1582)
- Theodore Beza (1519–1605)
- Peter Baro (1534–1599)
- Caspar Coolhaes (1536–1615)
- Herman Witsius (1636–1708)
- Charles Borromeo (1538–1584)
- John of the Cross (1542–1591)
- Johannes Piscator (1546–1625)
- Richard Hooker (1554–1600)
- Lancelot Andrewes (1555–1626)
- Johannes Wtenbogaert (1557–1644)
- William Perkins (1558–1602)
- Jacob Arminius (1560–1609)
- Anton Praetorius (1560–1613)
- Daniel Tilenus (1563–1633)
- Francis de Sales (1567–1622)
- William Laud (1573–1645)
- Willem van der Codde (1574 – c.1630)
- Thomas Helwys (c. 1575 – c. 1616),
- Jakob Boehme (1575–1624)
- Samuel Brooke (1575–1631)
- Eduard Poppius (c. 1576–1624)
- Jacobus Taurinus (1576–1618)
- Gerardus Vossius (1577–1649)
- Thomas Jackson (1579–1640)
- Johannes Arnoldi Corvinus (c. 1582–1650)
- Johann Gerhard (1582–1637)
- Simon Episcopius (1583–1643)
- Hugo Grotius (1583–1645)
- Zachary Boyd (1585–1653)
- Dirk Rafelsz Camphuysen (1586–1627)
- Étienne de Courcelles (1586–1659)
- Caspar Barlaeus (1584–1648)
- John Goodwin (1593–1665)
- Moses Amyraut (1596–1664)

== 17th century ==
- Petrus Serrarius (1600–1669)
- Owen Feltham (c. 1602–1668)
- Henry Hammond (1605–1660)
- John Milton (1608–1674)
- Laurence Womock (1612–1686)
- John Pearson (1613–1686)
- Jeremy Taylor (1613–1667)
- Richard Baxter (1615–1691)
- John Owen (1616–1683)
- Francis Turretin (1623–1687)
- George Fox (1624–1691)
- Simon Patrick (1626–1707)
- John Flavel (1627–1691)
- Stephen Charnock (1628–1680)
- Philipp van Limborch (1633–1712)
- George Bull (1634–1710)
- Thomas Grantham (1634–1692)
- Thomas Burnet (c. 1635–1715)
- Philipp Jakob Spener (1635–1705)
- Edward Stillingfleet (1635–1699)
- Isaac Newton (1643–1727)
- Gilbert Burnet (1643–1715)
- Isaac Jacquelot (1647–1708)
- Fénelon (1651–1715)
- Jean Leclerc (1657–1736)
- Emanuel Swedenborg (1688–1772)
- Johann Jakob Wettstein (1693–1754)
- John Gill (1697–1771)

== 18th century ==
- Nicolas Ludwig Count von Zinzendorf (1700–1760)
- Jonathan Edwards (1703–1758)
- John Wesley (1703–1791)
- Charles Wesley (1707–1788)
- George Whitefield (1714–1770)
- John Brown (1722–1787)
- John Fletcher (1729–1785)
- Gotthold Ephraim Lessing (1729–1781)
- Ignaz Wurz (1731–1784)
- John Hey (1734–1815)
- Thomas Coke (1747–1814)
- Georg Wilhelm Friedrich Hegel (1770–1831)
- Aaron Bancroft (1755–1839)
- Heinrich Paulus (1761–1851)
- Adam Clarke (1762–1832)
- Friedrich Schleiermacher (1768–1834)
- Archibald Alexander (1772–1851)
- Lyman Beecher (1775–1863)
- Nathan Bangs (1778–1862)
- Thomas Hartwell Horne (1780–1862)
- Richard Watson (1781–1833)
- Nathaniel William Taylor (1786–1858)
- Charles Grandison Finney (1792–1875)
- Wilbur Fisk (1792–1839)
- Charles Hodge (1797–1878)

== 19th century ==
- John Henry Newman (1801–1890)
- Christian Hermann Weisse (1801–1866)
- Leonard Bacon (1802–1881)
- Horace Bushnell (1802–1876)
- Frederick Denison Maurice (1805–1872)
- Horatius Bonar (1808–1889)
- C. F. W. Walther (1811–1887)
- Thomas Osmond Summers (1812–1882)
- Franz Delitzsch (1813–1890)
- Søren Kierkegaard (1813–1855)
- John Miley (1813–1895)
- John McClintock (1814–1870)
- James Stuart Russell (1816–1895)
- J. C. Ryle (1816–1900)
- Ransom Dunn (1818–1900)
- Philip Schaff (1819–1893)
- Randolph Sinks Foster (1820–1903)
- Henry C. Sheldon (1820–1877)
- Mary Baker Eddy (1821–1910)
- William Burt Pope (1822–1903)
- Albrecht Ritschl (1822–1889)
- James Strong (1822–1894)
- Willibald Beyschlag (1823–1900)
- A. A. Hodge (1823–1886)
- William Alexander (1824–1911)
- William Booth (1829–1912)
- Frederic William Farrar (1831–1903)
- Heinrich Julius Holtzmann (1832–1910)
- James Strong (1833–1913)
- William Fairfield Warren (1833–1929)
- Charles Spurgeon (1834–1892)
- Henry Barclay Swete (1835–1918)
- Augustin Gretillat (1837–1894)
- Abraham Kuyper (1837–1920)
- Paul Petter Waldenström (1838–1917)
- Peter Taylor Forsyth (1842–1921)
- Albert Benjamin Simpson (1843–1919)
- C. I. Scofield (1843–1921)
- Borden Parker Bowne (1847–1910)
- Hugh Price Hughes (1847–1902)
- Bernhard Stade (1848–1906)
- Adolf von Harnack (1851–1930)
- B. B. Warfield (1851–1921)
- Franz Pieper (1852–1931)
- Charles Taze "Pastor" Russell (1852–1916)
- Herman Bavinck (1854–1921)
- Max Reischle (1858–1905)
- Walter Rauschenbusch (1861–1918)
- Billy Sunday (1862–1935)
- Geerhardus Vos (1862–1949)
- Nicholas Timothy Clerk (1862–1961)
- Richard C. H. Lenski (1864–1936)
- Rudolf Otto (1869–1937)
- William Henry Chamberlin (1870–1921)
- Sergei Bulgakov (1871–1944)
- Lewis Sperry Chafer (1871–1952)
- Louis Berkhof (1873–1957)
- Albert C. Knudson (1873–1953)
- Nikolai Berdyaev (1874–1948)
- Karl Heim (1874–1958)
- Albert Schweitzer (1875–1965)
- Reginald Garrigou-Lagrange (1877–1964)
- H. Orton Wiley (1877–1961)
- Mary Ely Lyman (1880s – 1975)
- Nikolaj Velimirović (1880–1956)
- Edwin Lewis (1881–1959)
- John Gresham Machen (1881–1937)
- William Temple (1881–1944)
- Johannes Pedersen (1883–1977)
- Edgar S. Brightman (1884–1953)
- Rudolf Karl Bultmann (1884–1976)
- Étienne Gilson (1884–1978)
- E. Stanley Jones (1884–1973)
- Oliver Chase Quick (1885–1944)
- Karl Barth (1886–1968)
- Paul Tillich (1886–1965)
- Friedrich Gogarten (1887–1967)
- Vincent Taylor (1887–1968)
- Emil Brunner (1889–1966)
- Dietrich von Hildebrand (1889–1977)
- Leonard Hodgson (1889–1969)
- Anders Nygren (1890–1978)
- Georgia Harkness (1891–1974)
- Reinhold Niebuhr (1892–1971)
- Dorothy Sayers (1893–1957)
- H. Richard Niebuhr (1894–1962)
- Fulton Sheen (1895–1979)
- Cornelius Van Til (1895–1987)
- Henri de Lubac (1896–1991)
- Mildred Barker (1897–1990)
- Dorothy Day (1897–1980)
- A. W. Tozer (1897–1963)
- C. S. Lewis (1898–1963)
- John Murray (1898–1975)
- Howard Thurman (1899–1981)
- Martyn Lloyd-Jones (1899–1981)

== 20th century ==
- Gerhard von Rad (1901–1971)
- Gordon Clark (1902–1985)
- Oscar Cullmann (1902–1999)
- Watchman Nee (1903–1972)
- Dumitru Stăniloae (1903–1993)
- Yves Congar (1904–1995)
- Bernard Lonergan (1904–1984)
- Joseph Sittler (1904–1987)
- Karl Rahner (1904–1984)
- J. Vernon McGee (1904–1988)
- Hans Urs von Balthasar (1905–1988)
- Eric Lionel Mascall (1905–1993)
- Mildred Bangs Wynkoop (1905–1997)
- Dietrich Bonhoeffer (1906–1945)
- Joseph Clifford Fenton (1906–1969)
- Albert C. Outler (1908–1989)
- F. F. Bruce (1910–1990)
- W. T. Purkiser (1910–1992)
- John Walvoord (1910–2002)
- George Eldon Ladd (1911–1982)
- Frank Stagg (1911–2001)
- Alan Walker (1911–2003)
- Jacques Ellul (1912–1994)
- Francis Schaeffer (1912–1984)
- Dafydd Rhys ap Thomas (1912–2011)
- Carl F. H. Henry (1913–2003)
- Anthony A. Hoekema (1913–1988)
- Bolaji Idowu (1913–1993)
- Thomas F. Torrance (1913–2007)
- Leon Lamb Morris (1914–2006)
- Thomas Berry (1914–2009)
- Hebe Charlotte Kohlbrugge (1914–2016)
- Anthony of Sourozh (Andrei Borisovich Bloom, 1914–2003)
- Vernon Grounds (1914–2010)
- Edward Schillebeeckx (1914–2009)
- Markus Barth (1915–1994)
- Thomas Merton (1915–1968)
- Derek Prince (1915–2003)
- J. Dwight Pentecost (1915–2014)
- Marie-Émile Boismard (1916–2004)
- William Ragsdale Cannon (1916–1997)
- Stanley Monroe Horton (1916–2014)
- Victor Paul Wierwille (1916–1985)
- C. K. Barrett (1917–2011)
- G. B. Caird (1917–1984)
- Edmund Clowney (1917–2005)
- Avery Dulles (1918–2008)
- Billy Graham (1918–2018)
- J. Rodman Williams (1918–2008)
- Langdon Gilkey (1919–2004)
- John Macquarrie (1919–2007)
- Catharina Halkes (1920–2011)
- Karol Wojtyła (Pope John Paul II) (1920–2005)
- J. Kenneth Grider (1921–2006)
- George Wesley Buchanan (1921–2019)
- Alexander Schmemann (1921–1983)
- John Stott (1921–2011)
- John Hick (1922–2012)
- Hans Wilhelm Frei (1922–1988)
- James M. Houston (1922–2026)
- Meredith G. Kline (1922–2007)
- John Alexander Motyer (1924–2016)
- John B. Cobb (1925–2024)
- James Leo Garrett Jr. (1925–2020)
- John J McNeill (1925–2015)
- Charles Ryrie (1925–2016)
- Frederick Buechner (1926–2022)
- H. Ray Dunning (born 1926)
- Jurgen Moltmann (1926–2024)
- J. I. Packer (1926–2020)
- Thomas J. J. Altizer (1927–2018)
- Gerhard Forde (1927–2005)
- Chuck Smith (1927–2013)
- Joseph Ratzinger (Pope Benedict XVI) (1927–2022)
- John Howard Yoder (1927–1997)
- Mary Daly (1928–2010)
- Gustavo Gutiérrez (1928–2024)
- Hans Küng (1928–2021)
- Martin E. Marty (born 1928)
- Johann Baptist Metz (1928–2019)
- Wolfhart Pannenberg (1928–2014)
- William Stringfellow (1928–1985)
- Carl Braaten (1929–2023)
- Kwesi Dickson (1929–2005)
- Kosuke Koyama (小山晃佑, 1929–2009)
- Dorothee Soelle (1929–2003)
- James D. Strauss (1929–2014)
- Joseph A. Bracken (born 1930)
- Ignacio Ellacuría (1930–1989)
- Michael Green (1930–2019)
- John Polkinghorne (1930–2021)
- Robert Jenson (1930–2017)
- David Pawson (1930–2020)
- Patricia Reif (1930–2002)
- William L. Lane (1931–1999)
- John S Mbiti (1931–2019)
- Thomas C. Oden (1931–2016)
- Adrian Rogers (1931–2005)
- John Shelby Spong (1931–2021)
- John Zizioulas (1931–2023)
- Millard Erickson (born 1932)
- Norman Geisler (1932–2019)
- Eugene H. Peterson (1932–2018)
- Alvin Plantinga (born 1932)
- Robert L. Reymond (1932–2013)
- Charles Stanley (1932–2023)
- Rubem Alves (1933–2014)
- Walter Brueggemann (born 1933)
- Roger T. Forster (born 1933)
- Walter Kaiser Jr. (born 1933)
- Michael Novak (1933–2017)
- Marjorie Hewitt Suchocki (born 1933)
- Charles E. Curran (born 1934)
- Gordon Fee (1934–2022)
- I. Howard Marshall (1934–2015)
- Mercy Oduyoye (born 1934)
- Henry Wansbrough (born 1934)
- Rolland D. McCune (1934–2019)
- Dallas Willard (1935–2013)
- Rosemary Radford Ruether (1936–2022)
- Justo Gonzalez (born 1937)
- Clark Pinnock (1937–2010)
- Anthony Thiselton (1937–2023)
- Ed Parish Sanders (1937–2022)
- Richard Thomas France (1938–2012)
- Leonardo Boff (born 1938)
- David J. A. Clines (1938–2022)
- James Hal Cone (1938–2018)
- Jack Cottrell (1938–2022)
- Ronald M. Enroth (1938–2023)
- Elisabeth Schüssler Fiorenza (born 1938)
- James Montgomery Boice (1938–2000)
- Keith Ward (born 1938)
- James Dunn (1939–2020)
- John Frame (born 1939)
- John F. MacArthur (1939–2025)
- R. C. Sproul (1939–2017)
- Matthew Fox (born 1940)
- Stanley Hauerwas (born 1940)
- Walter Klaiber (born 1940)
- John N. Oswalt (born 1940)
- Stephen Tong (born 1940)
- Elizabeth Johnson (born 1941)
- Erwin Lutzer (born 1941)
- George Newlands (born 1941)
- Marcus Borg (1942–2015)
- Grant R. Osborne (1942–2018)
- Paige Patterson (born 1942)
- Lamin Sanneh (1942–2019)
- Marilyn McCord Adams (1943–2017)
- John Lennox (born 1943)
- Douglas Stuart (born 1943)
- Gareth Lee Cockerill (born 1944)
- Klyne Snodgrass (born 1944)
- John Ankerberg (born 1945)
- Kwame Bediako (1945–2008)
- Keith Drury (born 1945)
- D. A. Carson (born 1946)
- John Piper (born 1946)
- Vern Poythress (born 1946)
- Andrew Purves (born 1946)
- John Sailhamer (1946–2017)
- William Willimon (born 1946)
- William J. Abraham (1947–2021)
- Paul S. Fiddes (born 1947)
- Jesse Mugambi (born 1947)
- Greg Bahnsen (1948–1995)
- David Brown (born 1948)
- Marva Dawn (1948–2021)
- Sinclair Ferguson (born 1948)
- Bob Goss (born 1948)
- Wayne Grudem (born 1948)
- Scotty McLennan (born 1948)
- J.P. Moreland (born 1948)
- Michael Plekon (born 1948)
- N. T. Wright (born 1948)
- William Lane Craig (born 1949)
- Ray Comfort (born 1949)
- Chris Glaser (born 1950)
- Stanley Grenz (1950–2005)
- Donald E. Battle (born 1950)
- Gary Habermas (born 1950)
- Timothy J. Keller (1950–2023)
- Katherine Sonderegger (born 1950)
- Rowan Williams (born 1950)
- Nancy Wilson (born 1950)
- Ken Ham (born 1951)
- Ben Witherington (born 1951)
- Marcella Althaus-Reid (1952–2009)
- Joel R. Beeke (born 1952)
- Greg Laurie (born 1952)
- Alistair Begg (born 1952)
- Kenneth J. Collins (born 1952)
- Roger E. Olson (born 1952)
- Carsten Peter Thiede (1952–2004)
- Daniel B. Wallace (born 1952)
- Kent Hovind (born 1953)
- Musimbi Kanyoro (born 1953)
- Catherine Keller (born 1953)
- Randy L. Maddox (born 1953)
- William D. Mounce (born 1953)
- Alister McGrath (born 1953)
- Adele Reinhartz (born 1953)
- Douglas Wilson (born 1953)
- Peter Lampe (born 1954)
- Scott J. Jones (born 1954)
- Thomas R. Schreiner (born 1954)
- Tina Beattie (born 1955)
- Craig Blomberg (born 1955)
- Michael L. Brown (born 1955)
- Skip Heitzig (born 1955)
- Don Thorsen (born 1955)
- Graham Ward (born 1955)
- Robert Jeffress (born 1955)
- Joel B. Green (born 1956)
- Miroslav Volf (born 1956)
- Gregory A. Boyd (born 1957)
- Douglas Groothuis (born 1957)
- Scott Hahn (born 1957)
- Daniela Müller (born 1957)
- Kevin J. Vanhoozer (born 1957)
- Gavin D'Costa (born 1958)
- Robert A. J. Gagnon (born 1958)
- James Alison (born 1959)
- R. Albert Mohler Jr. (born 1959)
- Timothy Tennent (born 1959)
- Yves-Marie Adeline (born 1960)
- Mark Dever (born 1960)
- Craig S. Keener (born 1960)
- Frank Turek (born 1961)
- Peter Enns (born 1961)
- Paul Washer (born 1961)
- Willie James Jennings (born 1961)
- Paul Copan (born 1962)
- Elizabeth Stuart (born 1963)
- Michael Horton (born 1964)
- Seung-Moo Ha (하승무, born 1963)
- David Bentley Hart (born 1965)
- Thomas Jay Oord (born 1965)
- R. C. Sproul, Jr. (born 1965)
- Ken Schenck (born 1966)
- Mikael Mogren (born 1969)
- Robert Arp (born 1970)
- Timothy Paul Jones (born 1973)
- Ulrich L. Lehner (born 1976)
- Heidrun E. Mader (born 1977)
- John L. Drury (born 1978)
- Michael S. Heiser (1963–2023)
- Gavin Ortlund (born 1983)

== See also ==
- List of Catholic philosophers and theologians
- Doctor of the Church (Catholicism / Orthodox Christianity)
- List of Methodist theologians
- List of Reformed Baptists
- List of renewal theologians
- Christian theologian
- Category:Christian theologians
