= William Trumbull (diplomat) =

English diplomat and administrator (d. 1635)

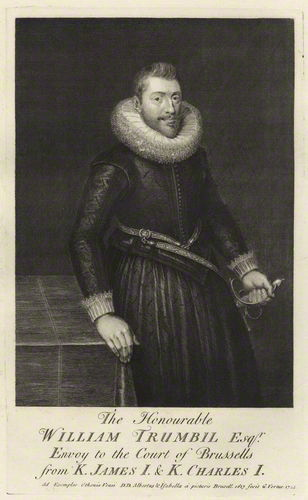
- William Trumbull, 1726 by George Vertue after Otto van Veen.
- Born: 1575?
- Died: 1635
- Occupations: Diplomat, administrator, politician

William Trumbull (1575?–1635) was an English diplomat, administrator and politician. From 1605 to 1625 Trumbull was secretary and later envoy from James I and then Charles I at the Brussels Court of Archduke Albert of Austria, ruler of the Habsburg Netherlands.

Trumbull also had an interest in music. Around 1595 he compiled a personally prepared collection of lute manuscripts that has become known as the Trumbull lute book, which shows he would have had access to the lute music of English court composers spanning much of the reign of Elizabeth I.

== Life ==
He was son of John Trumbull of Craven, Yorkshire, and his wife, Elizabeth Brogden or Briggden. He seems to have been introduced at court by Sir Thomas Edmondes. Early in James I's reign he was a court messenger, and probably he was attached to Edmondes's embassy to the Archduke Albert of Austria, regent of the Netherlands.

When Edmondes was recalled from Brussels in 1609, Trumbull was promoted to succeed him as resident at the archduke's court, and retained the post for sixteen years, On 6 June 1611 he was instructed to demand the extradition of William Seymour and Lady Arbella Stuart should they land in the archduke's dominions. On 17 February 1614, he was granted an ordinary clerkship to the privy council; a sinecure, given that Trumbull remained at his post at Brussels. In 1620 he protested against the Spanish invasion of the Palatinate.

In 1624 he requested the reversion of one of the six clerks' places for himself and a clerkship of the privy seal for his eldest son. He was recalled in 1625 on the open rupture with Spain and on 16 February 1626 he was returned to parliament for Downton in Wiltshire. He assumed active duties as clerk of the privy council, devoting himself especially to naval matters.

On 28 March 1629, he was granted Easthampstead Park, Berkshire, on condition of maintaining a deer-park for the king's recreation. Soon afterwards he was appointed muster-master-general. He died in London in September 1635, being succeeded as clerk to the council by his godson Edward Nicholas, and was buried in Easthampstead church, where a monument was erected to his memory.

== Works ==
Trumbull's correspondence is a source for the diplomatic history of the period; it was preserved in various archives. Many of the letters were printed in Ralph Winwood's Memorials, and in Dudley Digges's Compleat Ambassador. While at Brussels Trumbull secured the private correspondence between Francisco de Vargas y Mexia and Cardinal Granvelle on the Council of Trent; an English translation was published in 1697 by Michael Geddes, and one in French by Michel Le Vassor in 1700.

== Family ==
By his wife Deborah, daughter of Walter Downes of Beltring, Kent, he left two sons and two daughters. The elder son, William (1594?–1668), was father of Sir William Trumbull.

== Notes ==
Attribution

This article incorporates text from a publication now in the public domain: "Trumbull, William (d.1635)". Dictionary of National Biography. London: Smith, Elder & Co. 1885–1900.
