= Bibliography of justification (theology) =

This is a sub-page for the Justification (theology) page.

== Ecumenical & General ==
- The Lutheran World Federation and The Roman Catholic Church. Joint Declaration on the Doctrine of Justification. English-Language Edition. Grand Rapids: Eerdmans, 2000. ISBN 0-8028-4774-9
- Kärkkäinen, Veli-Matti. One With God: Salvation As Deification And Justification. Collegeville, MN: Liturgical Press, 2005. ISBN 0-8146-2971-7
- McGrath, Alister E. Iustitia Dei : A History of the Christian Doctrine of Justification. Cambridge: Cambridge University Press, 1986. ISBN 0-521-62481-9
- Oden, Thomas C. The Justification Reader. Grand Rapids: Eerdmans, 2002. ISBN 0-8028-3966-5
- Seifrid, Mark A. Christ, Our Righteousness: Paul's Theology of Justification. Downers Grove, IL: InterVarsity Press, 2001. ISBN 0-8308-2609-2
- Reimer, Matthias. An Intertextual Approach to the Paradox of Romans 2:13 and 3:20: Justified by Law Observance? Hamburg: Dr. Kovač, 2022. ISBN 978-3-339-12904-8

== Orthodox ==
- Carlton, Clark. The Life: The Orthodox Doctrine of Salvation. Salisbury, MA: Regina Orthodox Press, 2001. ISBN 1-928653-02-2
- Mantzaridis, Georgios I. The Deification of Man: St. Gregory Palamas and the Orthodox Tradition. Crestwood, NY: St. Vladimir's Seminary Press, 1997. ISBN 0-88141-027-6
- Nellas, Panayiotis. Deification in Christ: Orthodox Perspectives on the Nature of the Human Person. Contemporary Greek Theologians, Vol. 5. Crestwood, NY: St. Vladimir's Seminary Press, 1987. ISBN 0-88141-030-6
- Pappas, Barbara. Are You Saved?: The Orthodox Christian Process of Salvation. 4th Ed. Westchester, IL: Amnos Publications, 1997. ISBN 0-9623721-4-5
- Theophan the Recluse, Saint. The Path to Salvation: A Manual of Spiritual Transformation. Platina, CA: St. Herman Press, 1997. ISBN 1-887904-50-6
- Stavropoulos, C. Partakers of Divine Nature. Minneapolis: Light and Life Publishing, 1976. ISBN 0-937032-09-3
- Ware, Kallistos. How Are We Saved?: The Understanding of Salvation in the Orthodox Tradition. Minneapolis: Light and Life Publishing, 1996. ISBN 1-880971-22-4

== Roman Catholic Church ==
- The Catholic Church. The Catechism of the Catholic Church. Second Edition. New York: Doubleday, 2003. ISBN 0-385-50819-0
- Akin, James. The Salvation Controversy. Catholic Answers, 2001. ISBN 1-888992-18-2
- Armstrong, David. A Biblical Defense of Catholicism. Sophia Institute Press, 2003. ISBN 1-928832-95-4
- Armstrong, David. More Biblical Evidence for Catholicism: Companion to a Biblical Defense of Catholicism. Authorhouse, 2002. ISBN 0-7596-7072-2
- Balthasar, Hans Urs von. Theo-Drama: Theological Dramatic Theory, vols. 1-5. San Francisco: Ignatius Press, 1988. ISBN 0-89870-185-6
- Balthasar, Hans Urs von. The Theology of Karl Barth: Exposition and Interpretation. San Francisco: Ignatius Press, 1992. ISBN 0-89870-398-0
- Bouyer, Louis. The Spirit and Forms of Protestantism. Scepter, 2001. ISBN 1-889334-31-6
- Hahn, Scott, and Leon J. Suprenant, eds. Catholic for a Reason: Scripture and the Mystery of the Family of God. Emmaus Road, 1998. ISBN 0-9663223-0-4
- Hahn, Scott. "Faith Alone: Is It Justifiable? Catholic Answers Live with Dr. Scott Hahn," 3-part audio interview. El Cajon, CA: Catholic Answers.
- Hahn, Scott. "Justification: Becoming a Child of God" audio series. Saint Joseph Communications, 1995. ISBN 1-57058-037-5
- Hahn, Scott. "Romanism in Romans" audio series. Saint Joseph Communications.
- Kreeft, Peter. Fundamentals of the Faith. Fundamentals of the Faith. San Francisco: Ignatius Press, 1988. ISBN 0-89870-202-X
- Lubac, Henri de. Brief Catechesis on Nature and Grace. San Francisco: Ignatius Press, 1984. ISBN 0-89870-035-3
- Lubac, Henri de. The Mystery of the Supernatural. Herder & Herder, 1998. ISBN 0-8245-1699-0
- Maloney, George A. The Mystery of Christ in You: The Mystical Vision of Saint Paul. Alba House, 1998. ISBN 0-8189-0802-5
- Mitch, Curtis, and Scott Hahn, eds. The Letter of St. Paul to the Romans: Revised Standard Version (Ignatius Catholic Study Bible). San Francisco: Ignatius Press, 2003. ISBN 0-89870-938-5
- Ott, Ludwig. Fundamentals of Catholic Dogma. Rockford, IL: Tan Books & Publishers, 1974. ISBN 0-89555-009-1
- Pinckaers, Servais. The Sources of Christian Ethics. Catholic University of America Press, 1995. ISBN 0-8132-0818-1
- Schroeder, H. J., trans. The Canons and Decrees of the Council of Trent. Rockford, IL: Tan Books and Publishers, 1978. ISBN 0-89555-074-1
- Sungenis, Robert A. Not by Faith Alone: A Biblical Study of the Catholic Doctrine of Justification. Queenship Publishing Company, 1997. ISBN 1-57918-008-6
- Sungenis, Robert A. How Can I Get to Heaven?: The Bible's Teaching on Salvation Made Easy to Understand. Queenship Publishing Company, 1997. ISBN 1-57918-007-8

== Lutheran and Anglican ==
- Bayer, Oswald. Living by Faith: Justification and Sanctification. Geoffrey W. Bromiley, trans. Grand Rapids: Eerdmans, 2003. ISBN 0-8028-3987-8
- Concordia Triglotta: Libri symbolici Ecclesiae Lutheranae. St. Louis: Concordia Publishing House, 1921.
- Braaten, Carl E. Justification: The Article by Which the Church Stands or Falls. Minneapolis: Fortress Press, 1990. ISBN 0-8006-2403-3
- Braaten, Carl E. and Robert W. Jenson, eds. Union with Christ: The New Finnish Interpretation of Luther. Grand Rapids: Eerdmans, 1998. ISBN 0-8028-4442-1
- Elert, Werner. The Structure of Lutheranism. Volume One. Walter A. Hansen, trans. St. Louis: Concordia Publishing House, 1962. ISBN 0-570-03192-3
- Forde, Gerhard O. The Captivation Of The Will: Luther Vs. Erasmus On Freedom And Bondage. Grand Rapids: Eerdmans, 2005. ISBN 0-8028-2906-6
- Forde, Gerhard O. Justification by Faith: A Matter of Death and Life. Mifflintown, PA: Sigler Press, 1990. ISBN 0-9623642-5-8
- Hägglund, Bernt. The Background of Luther's Doctrine of Justification in Late Medieval Theology. Philadelphia: Fortress Press, 1980. ISBN 0-8006-3063-7
- Hein, David. "Austin Farrer on Justification and Sanctification." The Anglican Digest 49.1 (2007): 51–54.
- Jüngel, Eberhard. "The Freedom of a Christian: Luther's Significance for Contemporary Theology." Minneapolis: Augsburg Publishing, 1988. ISBN 0-8066-2393-4.
- Jüngel, Eberhard. "Justification: The Heart of the Christian Faith." Edinburgh: T&T Clark, 2001. ISBN 0-567-08775-1. Originally published in German by J. C. B. Mohr in 1999.
- Köberle, Adolf. The Quest for Holiness: A Biblical, Historical and Systematic Investigation. John C. Mattes, trans. Minneapolis: Augsburg Publishing House, 1938.
- Kolb, Robert and Timothy J. Wengert, eds. The Book of Concord: The Confessions of the Evangelical Lutheran Church. Minneapolis: Fortress Press, 2000. ISBN 0-8006-2740-7
- Luther, Martin. The Bondage of the Will. J. I. Packer and O. R. Johnston, trans. Grand Rapids: Fleming H. Revell (Baker Books), 1957. ISBN 0-8007-5342-9
- Mannermaa, Tuomo. Christ Present In Faith: Luther's View Of Justification. Minneapolis: Augsburg Fortress, 2005. ISBN 0-8006-3711-9
- Mattes, Mark C. The Role of Justification in Contemporary Theology. Grand Rapids: Eerdmans, 2004. ISBN 0-8028-2856-6
- Pieper, Francis. Christian Dogmatics. Volume II. Theodore Engelder, trans. St. Louis: Concordia Publishing House, 1951. ISBN 0-570-06713-8
- Preus, Robert. Justification and Rome. St. Louis: Concordia Academic Press, 1997. ISBN 0-570-04264-X
- Tappert, Theodore G., ed. The Book of Concord: The Confessions of the Evangelical Lutheran Church. Philadelphia: Fortress Press, 1959. ISBN 0-8006-0825-9

== Calvinist/Presbyterian/Reformed ==
- Sproul, R. C. Faith Alone: The Evangelical Doctrine of Justification. Grand Rapids: Baker Books, 1999. ISBN 0-8010-5849-X
- Hoekema, Anthony Saved by Grace. Grand Rapids: W.B. Eerdmans, 1989. ISBN 0-85364-625-2.
- Calvin, John Institutes of the Christian Religion. Ed. J.T. McNeill. Philadelphia: The Westminster Press, 1960 (original, 1541). ISBN 0-664-22028-2
- Buchanan, James The Doctrine of Justification. Vestavia Hills, AL: Solid Ground Christian Books, 2006 (original, 1867). ISBN 978-1-59925-073-1
- Owen, John The Doctrine of Justification by Faith Through the Imputation of the Righteousness of Christ Explained, Confirmed and Vindicated. Grand Rapids: Reformation Heritage Books, 2006 (original, 16--). ISBN 978-1-892777-97-3
- Waters, Guy Prentiss Justification and the New Perspective on Paul: A Review and Response. Phillipsburg, NJ: P&R Publishing, 2004. ISBN 978-0-87552-649-2
- Oliphint, K. Scott Justified in Christ: God's Plan for us in Justification. Fearn, Scotland: Mentor, 2007. ISBN 978-1-84550-246-1
- Piper, John The Future of Justification: A Response to N. T. Wright. Wheaton, IL: Crossway, 2007. ISBN 978-1-58134-964-1

== Arminian/Methodist/Wesleyan ==
- Cannon, W.R. The Theology of John Wesley: With Special Reference to the Doctrine of Justification. Lanham, MD: The University Press of America, 1984. ISBN 0-8191-4001-5
- Collins, Kenneth J. The Scripture Way of Salvation: The Heart of John Wesley's Theology. Nashville: Abingdon, 1997. ISBN 0-687-00962-6
- Collins, Kenneth J. Wesley on Salvation: A Study in the Standard Sermons. Grand Rapids, MI: Zondervan, 1989. ISBN 0-310-75421-6
- Grider, J. Kenneth. A Wesleyan-Holiness Theology. Kansas City: Beacon Hill, 1994. ISBN 0-8341-1512-3
- Maddox, Randy L. Responsible Grace: John Wesley's Practical Theology. Nashville: Kingswood Books, 1994. ISBN 0-687-00334-2
- Miley, John. Atonement in Christ, New York: Jennings & Graham, 1879 (O.P.)
- Miley, John. Systematic Theology (2 volumes). Eaton & Mains, 1892. ISBN 0-943575-09-5 (Hendrickson)
- Watson, Richard. Theological Institutes (2 Volumes). New York: Lane & Scott, 1851.
