= Henry Sheldon =

Henry Sheldon may also refer to:

- Henry Sheldon (educator) (1874–1948), American educator and historian
- Henry Newton Sheldon (1842–1926), justice of the Massachusetts Supreme Judicial Court
- Henry C. Sheldon (1845–1928), best known as Henry C. Sheldon, American Methodist theologian and writer
- Henry James Sheldon, was High Sheriff of Warwickshire in 1860
- Henry Sheldon (fl. 1880s), founder of the Henry Sheldon Museum of Vermont History
