= Kenneth Collins =

Kenneth Collins may refer to:

- Ken Collins (Scottish politician) (born 1939), Scottish politician
- Kenneth J. Collins (born 1952), American theologian and minister in the United Methodist Church
- Ken Collins (Kansas politician), member of the Kansas House of Representatives
