= Michel Le Vassor =

French Oratorian priest and author

Michel le Vassor (1648?–1718) was a French Oratorian priest and author, who became a Protestant in exile in England. He is known for theological, historical and political works.

== Life ==
He was born in Orléans about 1648. Influenced by Nicolas Malebranche, but also close to Jansenist in his view, he tried fruitlessly to reconcile Malebranche with Antoine Arnauld in 1679. In fact Le Vassor's lectures on grace after Malebranche, given at Saint-Magloire, set off a substantial public debate involving Arnauld.

Le Vassor left the Oratorians in 1690. In 1695 he was converted to Protestantism, and went to England via the Netherlands. There he was supported by William Bentinck, 1st Earl of Portland, and by Gilbert Burnet. He died in Northamptonshire.

He became a Fellow of the Royal Society in 1702.

== Works ==
Le Vassor's Traité de la véritable religion (1688) was an attack on the biblical criticism of Richard Simon, Jean Le Clerc, and Benedict Spinoza. It included early examples of arguments against Spinoza's thought that were to become standard, and was widely recommended (by the Lutheran Johann Wolfgang Jaeger as well as the Catholics Daniele Concina and Luis António Verney); Le Vassor's reputation was made by the work, accessible in French, and he was mentioned with the leading Catholic opponents of Spinoza, Daniel Huet (in Latin only) and François Lamy, as well as the Protestants Bernard Nieuwentyt and Buddeus. It was stated in the Traité as a commonplace that a form of Spinozism had become popular particularly in educated French circles, that its appeal was both its systematic character and the opportunities it afforded for sniping against the Bible and miracles, and that Spinoza had not in fact died an atheist as had been alleged, in Pierre Bayle's account. The main religious battle had now shifted, Le Vassor argued as many others did at the time, to face general impiety rather than just Protestant views, and an "enlightened" Christianity was required to provide effective opposition to free-thought. The basis needed was an emphasis on rational design in nature, the innateness of belief in a providential God (an argument also in René-Joseph Tournemine), and the continuity of tradition attesting the teaching of the Church. The design argument was used also at this time by Jacob Abbadie and Le Clerc, and was taken up later by Isaac Jaquelot and Jean Denyse.

Simon defended himself against Le Vassor in 1689 with an Apology, published in the name of a nephew. In the same year Le Vassor published some New Testament paraphrases.

The anonymous Les Soupirs de la France esclave (1689) has been attributed to Le Vassor; the traditional attribution to Pierre Jurieu is now much contested. It touched on economic themes under the ancien régime, was published in 15 parts, and was largely reprinted (13 parts) in 1788 as Les voeux d'un patriote, through the efforts of Jean-Paul Rabaut Saint-Étienne. Le Vassor's Lettres d'un gentilhomme français (1695), published at Liège, discussed a proposed French poll tax.

Traité de la manière d'examiner les différends de religion (1697) was seen as a work of apologetics on behalf of the Church of England. Lettres et memoires de François de Vargas, de Pierre de Malvenda et de quelques évéques d'Espagne touchant le Concile de Trent (1699) was a translation from Spanish originals of 16th-century letters of Francisco de Vargas y Mexia to Cardinal Granvelle relating to the Council of Trent, expanded by correspondence of Pedro de Malvenda and others. The letters were in the collection of Sir William Trumbull.

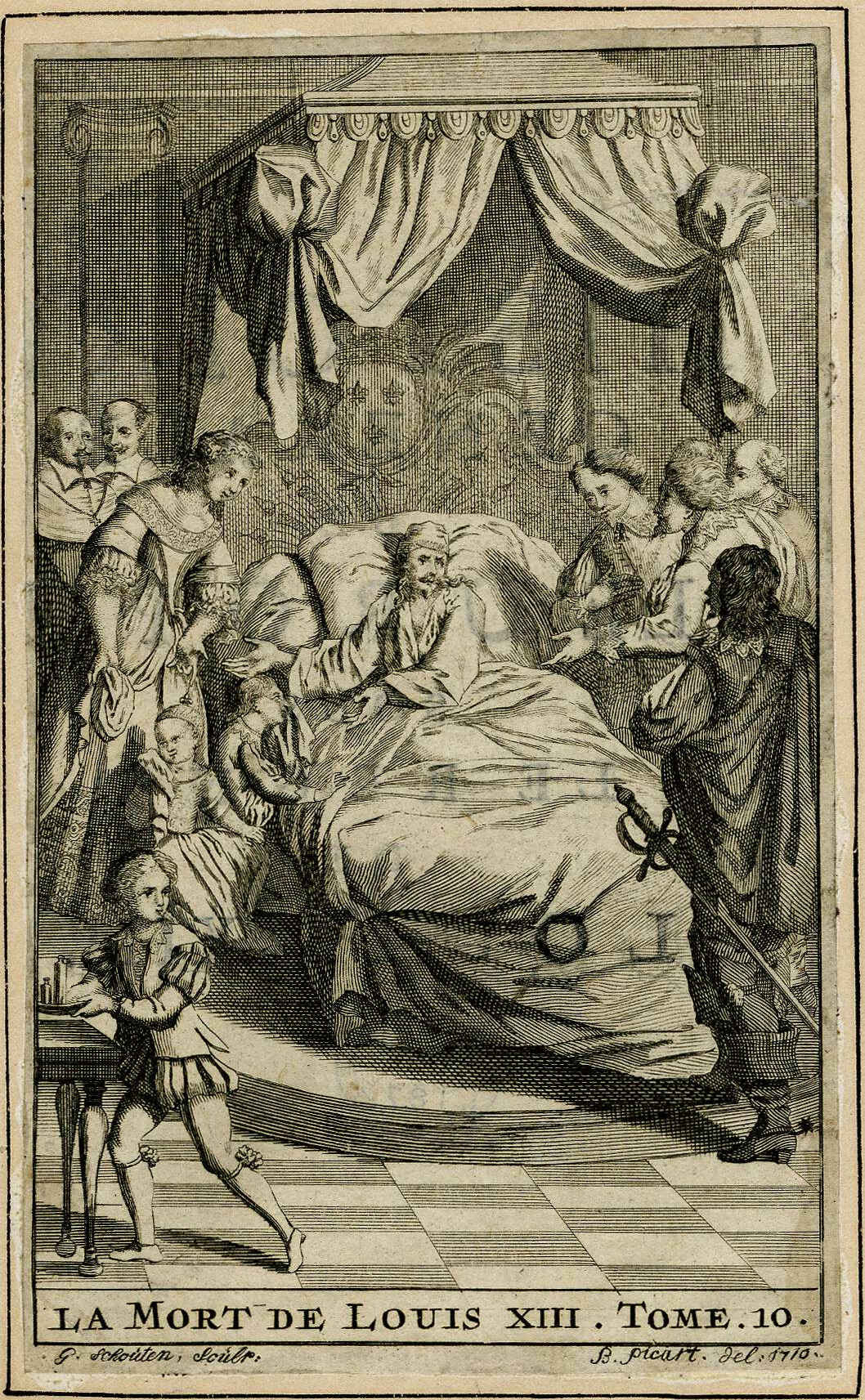
The death of Louis XIII, illustration from Le Vassor's history.

Other works were the Histoire du règne de Louis XIII (Amsterdam, from 1700, ten volumes) and An account of the present state and government of the Empire of Germany (1711) addressed to Thomas Foley, on the death of Joseph I, Holy Roman Emperor. The history of Louis XIII was a virulent anti-Catholic work; at the time of its publication Le Vassor was tutor to Henry Bentinck, known by the courtesy title Viscount Woodstock. Louis XIV made a point of asking Woodstock's father the Earl of Portland to dismiss Le Vassor; and Portland eventually complied for the sake of diplomacy. Voltaire wrote that this was the satirical work of an "odious declaimer", who sought only to denigrate Louis XIV, and of the factual content little was actually incorrect, though all the judgements were.
