= Michael Geddes =

Scottish clergyman and historian

Michael Geddes LL.D. (1650?–1713) was a Scottish clergyman of the Church of England and historian. He was born in Scotland about 1650, and educated at the University of Edinburgh, where he took the degree of M.A. in 1668. He was incorporated at Oxford on 11 July 1671, as one of the first four Scots who benefited by Bishop John Warner's exhibitions intended for Balliol College. These scholars were first placed in Gloucester Hall, but in 1672 they were moved to Balliol.

In 1678 Geddes went to Lisbon as chaplain to the English factory. In 1686 he was forbidden by the Inquisition to continue his functions, although he pleaded a traditional privilege, founded on the treaty between England and Portugal. The English merchants wrote immediately to Henry Compton, bishop of London, to assert their rights; but before their letter reached its destination Geddes was suspended by the ecclesiastical commissioners appointed by James II. Matters had to await the arrival of Charles Scarborough, the English envoy, and Geddes returned in May 1688 to England.

Gilbert Burnet as bishop of Salisbury collated Geddes to the chancellorship of his cathedral on 12 June 1691. The Lambeth degree of LL.D. was conferred on Geddes, 16 April 1695, by Archbishop Thomas Tenison. He died in the early part of 1713.

== Works ==
Geddes' works include:

- ‘The History of the Church of Malabar, from the time of its being first discover'd by the Portuguezes in the year 1501. … Together with the synod of Diamper, celebrated in … 1599, done out of Portugueze into English. With some remarks upon the faith and doctrines of the Christians of St. Thomas in the Indies,’ London, 1694.
- ‘The Church-History of Ethiopia. Wherein the two great … Roman missions into that empire are placed in their true light. To which are added an epitome of the Dominican History of that Church, and an account of the practices and conviction of Maria of the Annunciation, the famous nun of Lisbon,’ London, 1696.
- ‘The Council of Trent no free Assembly: more fully discovered by a collection of letters and papers of the learned Dr. Vargas and other … Ministers who assisted at the said Synod. Published from the original manuscripts in Spanish … with an introductory discourse concerning Councils, showing how they were brought under bondage to the Pope,’ London, 1697. The manuscripts consisted of original letters addressed by Francisco de Vargas y Mexia to Cardinal Granvelle, that came into the possession of Sir William Trumbull. Edward Stillingfleet had them, and requested Geddes to translate them.
- ‘Miscellaneous Tracts,’ 3 vols. London, 1702–6; 2nd edit. 1709; 3rd edit. 1715.
- ‘Several Tracts against Popery: together with the Life of Don Alvaro de Luna,’ London, 1715.
- ‘The most celebrated Popish Ecclesiastical Romance: being the Life of Veronica of Milan. Begun to be translated from the Portuguese by the late Dr. Geddes, and finish'd by Mr. Ozell,’ London, 1716.
