= John L. Drury =

American Theologian (born 1978)

- Born: November 16, 1978 (age 47)
- Spouse: Amanda Hontz Drury

Academic background
- Education: Indiana Wesleyan University; Princeton Theological Seminary

Academic work
- Institutions: Indiana Wesleyan University Indiana Wesleyan University
- Notable works: The Resurrected God: Karl Barth's Trinitarian Theology of Easter

Jonathan Leonard Drury (born November 16, 1978) is an ordained minister in The Wesleyan Church of North America and an American theologian known for his contribution to Christology, Wesleyan Theology, Barthianism, Holiness Theology, and Protestant Theology. He is currently the Professor of New Testament and Spiritual Formation at Indiana Wesleyan University following his time as the Discipleship Pastor in their Spiritual Formation Office. He was also an Associate Professor of Theology and Christian Ministry at Wesley Seminary.

== Biography ==
=== Early life ===
John was born to Keith Drury and Sharon Bailey Drury, both pastors in the Pilgrim Holiness Church and later the Wesleyan Church after its merger with The Wesleyan Methodist Church in 1968. John is the youngest of two sons.

=== Life and career ===
Drury earned his B.A. at Indiana Wesleyan University, majoring in Religion, Philosophy, and Biblical Literature, and graduated summa cum laude in 2001. While at Indiana Wesleyan, he met and later married Amanda Hontz of Holland, MI.

He went on to earn both his M.Div. in 2004 and his Ph.D. in Systematic Theology at Princeton Theological Seminary in Princeton, NJ. He was awarded the A. A. Hodge Prize in Systematic Theology at Princeton Theological Seminary and earned the rank of magna cum laude for his doctoral dissertation titled, "The Resurrected God: Karl Barth's Trinitarian Theology of Easter." in 2011.

Drury went on to become the inaugural Professor of Theology and Spiritual Formation at Wesley Seminary in Marion, IN where he served from 2010 to 2021. In 2021 he accepted the position of Spiritual Formation Coordinator in the chapel office at Indiana Wesleyan University. Since then, in Fall of 2023 he began his first semester in the position of New Testament Professor in the School of Theology and Ministry at Indiana Wesleyan University.

=== Honors and awards ===
A. A. Hodge Prize in Systematic Theology

At the 57th Annual meeting of The Wesleyan Theological Society at Duke Divinity School in March 2022, Drury was called "one of the two greatest young minds in the Wesleyan tradition" (along with Jason Vickers) by Dr. Cheryl Bridges Johns, during informal comments after her plenary address.

== Dissertation ==
Drury's landmark work on the theme of Resurrection in Karl Barth's fourth volume of Church Dogmatics was among the most influential English-language Christian theological dissertations of that year and earned him the rank of magna cum laude from Princeton Theological Seminary. It has since become a central text in numerous published works including Mark Edwards "The Divine Moment", Nixon De Vera's "The Suffering of God in the Eternal Decree: A Critical Study of Karl Barth on Election," Adriani Milli Rodrigues' "Toward a Priestly Christology: A Hermeneutical Study of Christ's Priesthood," and JP Haley's book "The Humanity of Christ: The Significance of the Anhypostasis and Enhypostasis in Karl Barth's Christology."

== Works ==
=== Books ===
- The Resurrected God: Karl Barth's Trinitarian Theology of Easter. Augsburg Fortress Publishers, 2014 ISBN 9781451482805
- Karl Barth and the Future of Evangelical Theology. Pickwick Publications. 2017 ISBN 9780227176658
- 19th and 20th Centuries, in A Canon of Christian Theology: The Methodist Tradition. London T&T Clark Publishers, 2014.
- Judgment. Methodist Doctrine, Vol. 10. Atlanta Cascade, 2016.

=== Articles ===
- "Promise and Command: Wesley and Barth on Matthew 5:48," in Karl Barth in Conversation, ed. W. Travis McMaken and David Congdon (Cascade Press, forthcoming).
- "Barth and Testimony," in Karl Barth and the Future of Evangelical Theology, ed. Christian T. Collins Winn and John L. Drury (Eugene, OR: Pickwick Publications, forthcoming).
- "The Paradox of the Evangelical Ecumenist: Reflections on Oberlin II," Ecumenical Trends (June 2008).
- "Hell and Hope in Balthasar: The Substitutionary Character of Christ's Descent into Hell and its Implications for the Extent of the Atonement," Koinonia Journal 17 (2005) pp. 93–104.
- "The Sending of the Church: Toward an Emergent Ecclesiology," Princeton Theological Review 11:3 (Autumn 2005) pp. 13–18.
- "Gregory of Nyssa's Dialogue with Macrina: The Compatibility of Resurrection and Immortality," Theology Today 62:2 (Jul 2005) pp. 210–222.
- "Luther and Wesley on Union and Impartation: Reopening the Dialogue in Light of Recent Finnish Luther Research," Wesleyan Theological Journal 40:1 (Spring 2005) pp. 58–68.
- "Light in Darkness: Hans Urs von Balthasar and the Catholic Doctrine of Christ's Descent into Hell – By Alyssa Lyra Pitstick," Reviews in Religion & Theology (August 2008).
- "From the Margins: A Celebration of the Theological Work of Donald W. Dayton – By Christian T. Collins Winn," Reviews in Religion & Theology (July 2008).
- "Karl Barth's Trinitarian Theology: A Study in Karl Barth's Analogical Use of the Trinitarian Relation – By Peter S. Oh," Reviews in Religion & Theology (December 2007).
- "Charles Wesley: A Biography ? By Gary M. Best," Reviews in Religion & Theology (September 2007)
