= Marie-Émile Boismard =

French biblical scholar (1916 – 2004)

Claude (Marie-Émile) Boismard (December 14, 1916 – April 23, 2004) was a French biblical scholar.

Boismard joined the Dominican Order in 1935, and was one of the most important French biblical scholars regarding the writings of Saint John the Apostle.

Educated in Rome, he was for many years professor of New Testament studies at the École Biblique in Jerusalem; he went on to work as one of the translators who created the Jerusalem Bible.

He advanced a new hypothesis concerned to the Synoptic problem, the question of Acts, the two texts of the Book of Revelation, and about the origins of the Codex Bezae.

== Works ==
- "L'Apocalypse", ou "les Apocalypses" de S. Jean, Revue Biblique, volume 56, No. 4 (October 1949), pp. 507-541
- L'Apocalypse (La Sainte Bible traduite en français sous la direction de l'École biblique de Jérusalem), Paris, Éd. du Cerf, 1950.
- Le Prologue de saint Jean, Paris, Éd. du Cerf, «Lectio Divina» 11, 1953.
- Du Baptême à Cana (Jean 1,19-2,11), Paris, Éd. du Cerf, «Lectio Divina» 18, 1956.
- Quatre hymnes baptismales dans la première épître de Pierre, Paris, Éd. du Cerf, «Lectio Divina» 30, 1961.
- Synopse des quatre évangiles en français avec parallèles des apocryphes et des Pères, vol. I, Textes, avec P. Benoit, Paris, Éd. du Cerf, 1965.
- Synopse des quatre évangiles en français, vol. II, Commentaire, avec P. Benoit, A. Lamouille et P. Sandevoir, Paris, Éd. du Cerf, 1972.
- Synopse des quatre évangiles en français, vol. III, L'évangile de Jean, avec A. Lamouille et G. Rochais, Paris, Éd. du Cerf, 1977.
- La Vie des Évangiles. Initiation à la critique des textes, avec A. Lamouille, Paris, Éd. du Cerf, 1980.
- Le Texte occidental des Actes des apôtres. Reconstitution et réhabilitation, (2 vol.) (Synthèse 17), avec A. Lamouille, Paris, Éd. Recherche sur les civilisations, 1984. Édition nouvelle entièrement refondue (Études bibliques NS 40), Paris, J. Gabalda, 2000.
- Synopsis Graeca Quattuor Evangeliorum, avec A. Lamouille, Leuven-Paris, Peeters, 1986.
- Moïse ou Jésus. Essai de christologie johannique (BETL, 86), Leuven, University Press-Peeters, 1988.
- Les Actes des deux apôtres (3 vol.) avec A. Lamouille (Études bibliques 12-14), Paris, J. Gabalda, 1989.
- Un évangile pré-johannique (F. vol. I [Jean 1,1-2,12] en 2 tomes, avec Arnaud Lamouille, Paris, Gabalda [Études Bibliques, n.s. 17-18], 1993; vol. II [Jean 2,13-4,54] en 2 tomes, Paris, Gabalda [Études Bibliques n.s. 24-25], 1994; vol. III).
- L'évangile de Marc. Sa préhistoire (F. Paris, Gabalda [Études Bibliques n.s. 26], 1994).
- Faut-il encore parler de « résurrection »? (F. Paris, Cerf, 1995)
- Jésus, un homme de Nazareth, raconté par Marc l'évangéliste, Éd. du Cerf, 1996.
- Le martyre de Jean l'apôtre (CRB 35), Paris, Gabalda, 1996.
- L'Évangile de l'enfance (Luc 1 - 2) selon le proto-Luc (Études bibliques 35), Paris, J. Gabalda, 1997.
- En quête du proto-Luc (Études bibliques 37), Paris, J. Gabalda, 1997.
- À l'aube du christianisme. Avant la naissance des dogmes (Théologie), Paris, Cerf, 1998.
- Critique textuelle ou critique littéraire? Jean 7,1-51 (CRB 40), Paris, J. Gabalda, 1998.
- La lettre de saint Paul aux Laodicéens retrouvée et commentée (CRB 42), Paris, Gabalda, 1999.
- L'énigme de la lettre aux Éphésiens (Études bibliques NS 39), Paris, J. Gabalda, 1999.
- Le baptême selon le Nouveau Testament (Théologies), Paris, Le Cerf, 2001.
- Comment Luc a remanié l'évangile de Jean (CRB 51), Paris, J. Gabalda, 2001.
- L'évangile selon Matthieu, d'après un papyrus de la collection Schøyen. Analyses littéraires (CRB 55), Paris, Gabalda, 2003.

== See also ==
- List of Christian theologians
