= Don Thorsen =

American scholar and writer (born 1955)

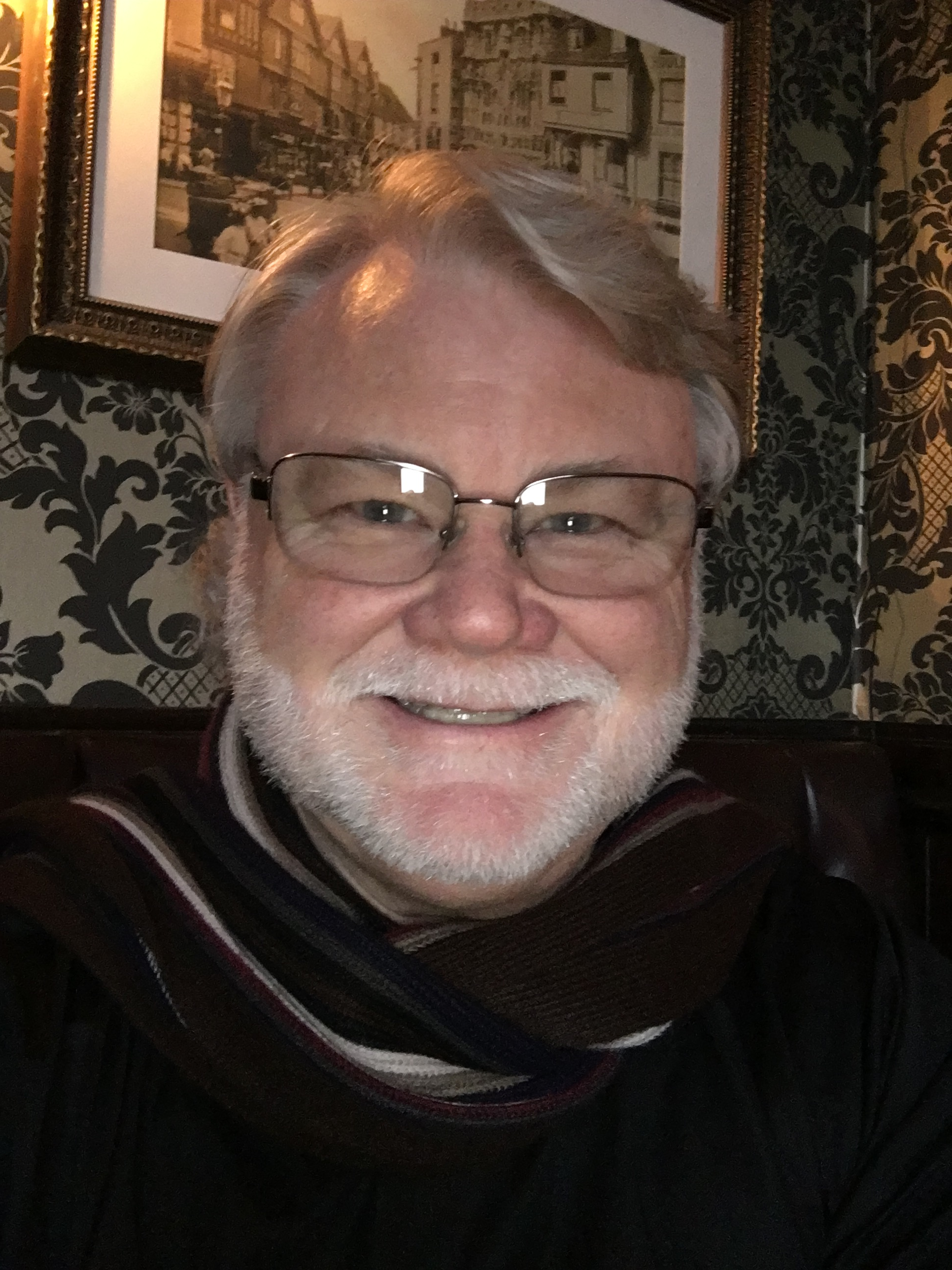
- Born: 1955 (age 70–71); Turlock, California
- Education: Drew University; Stanford University
- Occupations: Scholar and writer

Don Thorsen (born 1955 in Turlock, California) is an American theologian, author, and professor of theology whose work focuses on systematic theology, Wesleyan and ecumenical thought, and Christian ethics. His scholarship integrates historical theology, ecumenical engagement, and contemporary theological reflection, and he is widely recognized for his contributions to Wesleyan theological education.

After a long academic career that spans more than four decades, Thorsen currently teaches in the seminary at Azusa Pacific University. He previously taught as a Visiting Professor of Theology at Asbury Theological Seminary from 1985 to 1987.

He has been a contributing editor to Christianity Today, Light and Life, and Christian Scholar's Review. Thorsen teaches master's and doctoral classes and holds membership in such societies as the American Academy of Religion, Wesleyan Theological Society, and Oxford Institute.

== Education ==
Thorsen earned a Bachelor of Arts in Religious Studies from Stanford University, followed by a Master of Divinity (M.Div.) in Theology from Asbury Theological Seminary. He completed a Th.M. in Systematic Theology at Princeton Theological Seminary and subsequently obtained both an M.Phil. and a PhD in Theological and Religious Studies from Drew University.

== Career ==
Thorsen began his full-time academic teaching career as a Visiting Professor of Theology at Asbury Theological Seminary. He subsequently joined the faculty of Azusa Pacific University in Azusa, California, where he has served for nearly four decades as Professor of Theology and has held leadership responsibilities within theology and philosophy programs. His teaching and scholarship focus on systematic theology, Christian ethics, historical theology, and ecumenical studies.

In his academic work, Thorsen promotes the Wesleyan quadrilateral as a methodological complement to the Protestant Reformation emphasis on sola Scriptura. He argues that although the Protestant reformers emphasized the authority of Scripture as a corrective to ecclesial abuses, their theological method also relied upon systematic reasoning and the ecumenical creeds of the early Church. Following the approach of John Wesley, Thorsen affirms the primacy of Scripture together with the secondary, though genuine, theological authority of tradition, reason, and experience, commonly referred to as the Wesleyan quadrilateral.

Thorsen also contrasts the five points of Calvinism, commonly summarized by the acronym TULIP, with ACURA, a semi-Augustinian framework associated with Arminian and Wesleyan traditions (A = All are sinful; C = Conditional election; U = Unlimited atonement; R = Resistible grace; A = Assurance of salvation). He argues that, although many Christians identify with Calvinism at a doctrinal level, their lived religious practice more closely reflects semi-Augustinian assumptions.

Beyond teaching and research, Thorsen has been actively involved in national and international ecumenical initiatives. He has worked with the National Council of Churches through its Theological Dialogue on Matters of Faith and Order Convening Table and its programs on Interreligious Relations and Collaboration, and has also participated in ecumenical efforts with the Wesleyan Holiness Connection. He has served in editorial roles with Christianity Today and Christian Scholar’s Review.

In 2023, Thorsen received the J. Irwin Miller Award for Excellence in Ecumenical Leadership from the National Council of Churches.

== Research and scholarly works ==
Thorsen’s research focuses on systematic theology, Wesleyan theological method, ecumenism, and contemporary ethical and social questions in Christian thought. A central theme in his scholarship is the constructive use of the Wesleyan quadrilateral Scripture, tradition, reason, and experience as a framework for theological reflection, particularly in dialogue with Reformation approaches to authority and doctrine. His work frequently engages questions of salvation, grace, ecclesiology, and theological method within Wesleyan and broader Protestant traditions.

Thorsen has also made sustained scholarly contributions to ecumenical theology, examining how historic Christian creeds and councils continue to shape contemporary doctrinal discourse. This emphasis is reflected in his edited volume, Nicaea: The Council and Creed That Defined Christianity (2025), which brings together interdisciplinary perspectives on the historical and theological significance of the Nicene Creed for present-day churches.

In the area of public and contextual theology, Thorsen’s work addresses racism, social injustice, and the role of theology in public life. He is a co-editor of Confronting Racism and White Supremacy in the US: Twenty-First Century Theological Perspectives (2024), which situates theological reflection within contemporary debates on race, structural injustice, and Christian responsibility in the United States.

His monograph, I Am Who I Am: Unfolding the Biblical Understanding of God (2025), presents a biblical-theological study of the doctrine of God, integrating exegetical analysis with systematic and historical theology. In addition, Thorsen has contributed to scholarship on church life and mission through edited collections such as Golden Nuggets of Truth: Christian Wisdom for Church Life and Mission (2024), which explores practical and theological dimensions of Christian discipleship and ministry.

Beyond academic theology, Thorsen has also written in narrative form, using fiction as a medium for theological reflection in Jesus’ Best Friend: A Novel (2023), which explores themes of discipleship and relational faith from a theological perspective.

== Personal life ==
Thorsen is married to Andrea Thorsen. They live in Sierra Madre, California.

== Books ==
In addition to teaching, Thorsen has lectured around the world, and written numerous articles, book chapters, and books. His books include:

- I Am Who I Am: Unfolding the Biblical Understanding of God (Aldersgate Press, 2025). ISBN 978-1-60039-316-7
- Nicaea: The Council and Creed That Defined Christianity (Friendship Press, 2025), Edited by Don Thorsen, Jeanette Bouknight, Michael Trice, and Robby Waddell. ISBN 978-1-961088-28-3
- Confronting Racism and White Supremacy in the US: Twenty-First Century Theological Perspectives (Friendship Press, 2024), Co-edited with Michael Fisher, Jr., and Whitney Wilkinson Arreche. ISBN 978-1-961088-22-1
- Golden Nuggets of Truth: Christian Wisdom for Church Life and Mission (Emeth Press, 2024), Co-edited with Barry Callen and Kevin Mannoia. ISBN 978-1-60947-204-7
- Jesus’ Best Friend: A Novel (Resource Publications for Wipf & Stock, 2023). ISBN 978-1-6667-7239-5
- What's True About Christianity? An Introduction to Christian Faith and Practice. Claremont, CA: Claremont Press, 2020. ISBN 978-1946230416
- An Exploration of Christian Theology, 2nd ed. (Baker Academic, 2020) ISBN 978-1-54-096174-7.
- Pocket Dictionary of Christian Spirituality (InterVarsity, 2018) ISBN 978-0830849673.
- Christian Ethics and Moral Philosophy: An Introduction to Issues and Approaches (Baker Academic, 2018), with Craig A. Boyd. ISBN 978-0801048234.
- The Wesleyan Quadrilateral: An Introduction (Emeth Press, 2018). ISBN 978-1609471170
- Twelve Great Books that Changed the University (Cascade, 2014), with Steve Wilkens. ISBN 978-1498216333.
- Strength to Be Holy (Emeth, 2014). ISBN 978-1609470739.
- Calvin vs. Wesley: Bringing Belief in Line with Practice (Abingdon, 2013). ISBN 978-1426743351
- Unity in Mission: Theological Reflections on the Pilgrimage of Mission (Paulist, 2013), edited with Mitzi Budde. ISBN 978-0809148301.
- Heart and Life: Rediscovering Holy Living (Aldersgate, 2012), edited with Barry Callen. ISBN 978-1609470357.
- What Christians Believe about the Bible (Hendrickson, 2012), with Keith Reeves. ISBN 978-0801048319.
- Everything You Know about Evangelicals Is Wrong (Well, Almost Everything) (Baker Academic, 2010), with Steve Wilkens. ISBN 978-0801070976.
- The Holiness Manifesto (Eerdmans, 2008), edited with Kevin Mannoia. ISBN 978-0802863362.
- An Exploration of Christian Theology (Hendrickson, 2008; rpt. Baker Academic, 2010). ISBN 978-0801030901.
- Inclusive Language Handbook (Wesleyan/Holiness Women's Clergy, 1998), with Vickie Becker.
- Theological Resources for Ministry (Evangel, 1996). ISBN 978-0916035716.
- The Wesleyan Quadrilateral: Scripture, Tradition, Reason, and Experience as a Model of Evangelical Theology (Zondervan, 1990). ISBN 978-0310753414
