= Katherine Sonderegger =

American Episcopal theologian and priest (born 1950)

The Reverend Katherine Sonderegger
- Born: August 18, 1950 (age 76)

Ecclesiastical career
- Religion: Christianity (Anglican)
- Church: United Church of Christ; Episcopal Church (United States)
- Ordained: 1977 (UCC minister); 2000 (Episcopal deacon); 2001 (Episcopal priest)

Academic background
- Education: Smith College; Yale University; Brown University
- Thesis: Karl Barth's Dogmatic Interpretation of Israel (1990)
- Doctoral advisor: Wendell S. Dietrich

Academic work
- Discipline: Theology
- Sub-discipline: Systematic theology
- Institutions: Middlebury College; Virginia Theological Seminary

Katherine Sonderegger (born 18 August 1950) is William Meade Chair in Systematic Theology at Virginia Theological Seminary.

== Biography ==
Sonderegger received her AB in Medieval Studies from Smith College (1972), an M.Div. (Biblical Studies, 1976) and STM (Theology, 1984) at Yale Divinity School, and a Ph.D. from Brown University in Western Religious Thought (1990). Her Ph.D. dissertation was revised and published as That Jesus Christ was Born a Jew: Karl Barth's Doctrine of Israel (1992). She has taught at Middlebury College (1987–2002) and Bangor Theological Seminary (1993–1996) and, since 2002, at Virginia Theological Seminary, where she became the William Meade Professor in 2014. She was ordained a minister of the United Church of Christ in 1977, but in 1993 confirmed into the Episcopal Church and ordained a deacon and a priest in 2000.

In 2022, she was awarded the Karl Barth Prize by the Union of Evangelical Churches in the Evangelische Kirche in Deutschland for her work in Barth studies and in praise of her more recent work in constructive theology.

== Systematic Theology ==
In 2015, Sonderegger published her second book, The Doctrine of God, the first in a planned multi-volume systematic theology. Her project will focus on the unity of God in contrast to what she sees as the overemphasis of contemporary Christian theology on the Trinity. It also emphasizes that systematic theology should be undergirded by the Christian Bible. In 2020, she published the second volume, The Doctrine of the Holy Trinity: Processions and Persons. She is currently at work on the third volume, Divine Missions, Christology, and Pneumatology.

== Writings ==
- Systematic Theology, Volume 2: The Doctrine of the Holy Trinity: Processions and Persons. Minneapolis: Fortress Press, 2020. ISBN 9781506464183
- Praying the Stations of the Cross: Finding Hope in a Weary Land, with Margaret Adams Parker. Grand Rapids: William Eerdmans Publishing, 2019. ISBN 9780802876645
- The God We Worship: Conversations with Katherine Sonderegger. Barton: St. Mark's National Theological Centre, 2019.
- Systematic Theology, Volume 1: The Doctrine of God. Minneapolis: Fortress Press, 2015. ISBN 9781451496659
- That Jesus Christ Was Born a Jew: Karl Barth's Doctrine of Israel. Pennsylvania: Pennsylvania State University Press, 1992. ISBN 9780271039299
