= Dafydd Rhys ap Thomas =

Welsh Old Testament scholar

Dafydd Rhys ap Thomas (2 May 1912 – 19 May 2011) was a Welsh theologian, specialising in Old Testament studies.

== Early life and education ==
Thomas was born in Menai Bridge, Anglesey on 2 May 1912. His family included his parents, Jeanette and Rev. W. Keinion Thomas, and siblings Gwyn, Alon, Iwan, Jac, and Truda. He attended Beaumaris Grammar School after having been home-schooled. He studied Semitic and Hebrew Languages in Bangor and graduated with honours from the University College of North Wales in 1934. He then studied at Mansfield College, Oxford. He obtained an M.A. degree in theology from Oxford and a B.D. (bachelor of divinity) degree from the University of London. He then travelled to Berlin in 1937, where he had planned to complete his doctoral dissertation. At that time, though, the political climate and the threat of war in Nazi Germany made the situation untenable.

== Career ==
He became a lecturer in Hebrew at the University College, Bangor in 1938, and was later appointed as a senior lecturer. During that time, he was at Toronto University as a visiting lecturer on occasion. For one year, he worked in the Holy Land at an archaeological site. Thomas retired in 1977.

Thomas was an author, translator, and editor. He wrote A Primer of Old Testament Text Criticism – the first edition was published in 1947 and the second edition in 1961 – and was co-author with Gwilym H. Jones of Gramadeg Hebraeg y Beibl ("Grammar of Biblical Hebrew"), which was published in 1976. In 1962, his first edition of the translation of the two-volume Norwegian work The Psalms in Israel's Worship by Sigmund Mowinckel was published. He also translated works of Martin Noth and Otto Eissfeldt and helped translate the Old Testament for the New Welsh Bible. Between 1976 and 1990, the University of Wales Press published a series that he edited, Beibl a Chrefydd ("Bible and Worship").

He was secretary of Coleg Bala-Bangor, secretary and president of the Society for Old Testament Study, and president of the Union of Welsh Independents. Thomas was a lay minister and preacher at the Welsh Independents Hirael chapel in Bangor.

== Personal life ==
In 1940, Thomas married Menna Davies, whose parents were Marianne and Rev. George Davies. They lived with their children, Marian and Keinion, in Menai Bridge and Bangor.

His wife died in August 2004. He died 19 May 2011. Her grave is in Blaenau Ffestiniog and his ashes are also buried there.
