= George Moschabar =

George Moschabar (Greek: Γεώργιος Μοσχάμπαρ, name also transliterated "Moschampar," "Moschambar") was a thirteenth-century Greek Orthodox theologian, who was active in Constantinople during the decades of the 1270s and 1280s, at times serving there as professor of scriptural exegesis. He wrote against the Union of Lyons, at first anonymously, then, when the union was abrogated under Emperor Andronikos II, he took an active part in the synods that enforced a restoration of Orthodoxy. Under Patriarch Gregory II of Constantinople (Gregory of Cyprus, 1283–1289), Moschabar served as chartophylax, i.e., patriarchal secretary, but, because of disagreements between him and the patriarch, he stepped down from that office and worked to bring about Gregory's resignation.

Nothing certain is known about the years either of George Moschabar's birth or of his death, though he is last heard from in 1289, and by that time he was already an old man. Nor is it known where he was born. The name Moschabar is not of Greek derivation, which has led some to speculate that he was of Turkish or Semitic extraction. He also seems to have borne the name "Psyllos" or "Psilates." He was often referred to, ironically, as "the philosopher" or "the Aristotelian."

== Works ==
Most of George Moschabar's works are polemical, aimed at combating the ecclesiastical union between Greeks and Latins agreed to at Lyons in 1274 and, in particular, condemning the doctrine of the Filioque. The following works are extant, although most of them remain unpublished:

- A. Two dialogues, one with a Dominican, one with a Greek unionist, on the procession of the Holy Spirit. These were published anonymously during the 1270s. The dialogue with the Latin was reprinted in 1627 in Constantinople; in that publication, the work was ascribed to a contemporary Greek bishop named Maximos Margounios, who plagiarized Moschabar.
- B. A work Against the Pneumatomachians, also published anonymously, probably in 1279 or 1280. In it, Moschabar equates supporters of union with fourth-century heretics who denied the divinity of the Holy Spirit. John Bekkos, who was patriarch of Constantinople at the time and who supported the union, got hold of a copy of the treatise and wrote a refutation of it.
- C. Antirrhetic Chapters against the Writings and Teachings of Bekkos, a work of 33 chapters, published in August 1281 under the patronage of Gregory, Patriarch of Jerusalem. In this work, for the first time, Moschabar felt safe enough to publish openly, affixing his own name to the treatise. It has recently been edited by Demetra I. Moniou. John Bekkos wrote a refutation of at least part of this work; he mentions particularly his reply to ch. 16, in which Moschabar gives an interpretation of Revelation 22:1. This refutation has not survived.
- D. A critique of the authenticity of a phrase from St. John of Damascus's On the Orthodox Faith, καὶ προβολεὺς διὰ Λόγου ἐκφαντορικοῦ Πνεύματος, "and the producer, through the Word, of the manifesting Spirit," a phrase which had been appealed to by the unionists at the Synod of Blachernae in 1285 in defense of the orthodoxy of their position. Moschabar rejected the text as inauthentic. He wrote his critique probably before the end of 1286; an edition of it was published by Chrysostomos Sabbatos in 1998.
- E. A declaration, acknowledging the orthodoxy of Patriarch Gregory II on condition that he step down from office, which was written in 1289

== Literature ==
- Laurent, Vitalien (1929). "Un polémiste grec de la fin du XIIIe siècle. La vie et les oeuvres du Georges Moschabar". Échos d'Orient. 28: 129–158. doi:10.3406/rebyz.1929.2603.
- Laurent, Vitalien (1936). "A propos de Georges Moschambar, polémiste antilatin. Notes et rectifications". Échos d'Orient. 35 (183): 336–347. doi:10.3406/rebyz.1936.2875.
- Makarov, Dmitry I. "The thirteenth-century prerequisites of St. Gregory Palamas' theology ," Parrésia 9-10 (2015-2016), 99–112.
- Margounios, Maximos Διάλογος Μαξίμου τοῦ Μαργουνίου, ταπεινοῦ Κυθήρων ἐπισκόπου (Constantinople, 1627).
- Moniou, Demetra I. Γεώργιος Μοσχάμπαρ: ἕνας ἀνθενωτικὸς θεολόγος τῆς πρωϊμῆς Παλαιολογείας περιόδου. Βίος καὶ ἔργο (Athens, 2011).
- Papadakis, Aristeides (1997) [1983]. Crisis in Byzantium: The Filioque Controversy in the Patriarchate of Gregory II of Cyprus (1283-1289) (Rev. ed.). Crestwood, NY: St. Vladimir's Seminary Press. ISBN 9780881411768.
- Sabbatos, Chrysostomos Γεωργίου Μοσχάμπαρ: Ἀπόδειξις ὅτι οὐκ ἔστι τὸ τοιοῦτον βλάσφημον κεφάλαιον τοῦ μεγάλου πατρὸς Δαμασκηνοῦ Ἰωάννου τὸ ἐπιγεγραμμένο "περὶ θείων ὀνομάτων" ἀκριβέστερον (Athens, 1998).
