= Peter Quesnel =

English Franciscan

Peter Quesnel (or Quesuel) (d. 1299?) was an English Franciscan friar who became the warden of the Franciscan house at Norwich, England. Quesnel held a high reputation as a "theologian and doctor of the canon law", and was the author of Directorium Juris in Foro Conscientiæ et Juridiciali.

== Works ==
Quesnel's work is divided into four books:

- De summa Trinitate et fide Catholica, et de septem Sacramentis;
- De iisdem Sacramentis ministrandis et accipiendis;
- De Criminibus quæ a Sacramentis impediunt et de pœnis iisdem injungendis;
- De iis quæ ad jus spectant ordinate dirigendis.

(Little, Greyfriars at Oxford, p. 224 n. 1, Oxf. Hist. Soc.).
