= Nicephorus Gregoras =

Byzantine astronomer and scholar (c. 1295 – 1360)

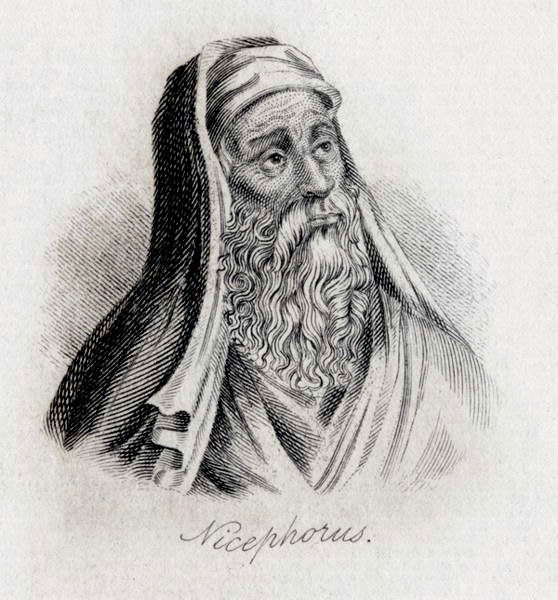
- Born: c. 1295; Heraclea Pontica, Bithynia
- Died: c. 1360; Constantinople
- Scientific career
- Fields: Astronomy; historiography; theology
- Academic advisors: Theodore Metochites
- Notable students: Isaac Argyros

Nicephorus Gregoras (/ˈɡrɛɡərəs/; Greek: Νικηφόρος Γρηγορᾶς, Nikēphoros Grēgoras; c. 1295 – c. 1360) was a Byzantine astronomer, historian, and theologian. His 37-volume Roman History, a work of erudition, constitutes a primary documentary source for the 14th century.

== Life ==
Gregoras was born at Heraclea Pontica, in Bithynia of Asia Minor, where he was raised and educated by his uncle, John, who was the Bishop of Heraclea. At an early age he settled at Constantinople, where his uncle introduced him to Andronicus II Palaeologus, by whom he was appointed chartophylax (keeper of the archives). In 1326 Gregoras proposed (in a treatise which remains in existence) certain reforms in the calendar, which the emperor refused to carry out for fear of disturbances; over two hundred years later they were introduced by Gregory XIII on almost the same lines.

=== Downfall of Andronicus II ===
When Andronicus was dethroned (1328) by his grandson Andronicus III Palaeologus, Gregoras shared his downfall and retired into private life. Attacked by Barlaam of Calabria, he was with difficulty persuaded to come forward and meet him in a war of words, in which Barlaam was bested. This greatly enhanced his reputation and brought him a large number of pupils.

Gregoras remained loyal until the death of the elder Andronicus. Thereafter he succeeded in gaining the favour of Andronicus III, who appointed him to conduct negotiations for a union of the Greek and Latin churches with the ambassadors of Pope John XXII. The negotiations, which took place in 1333, failed to achieve a resolution.

=== Hesychast controversy ===
Beginning in 1346, Gregoras took an important part in the Hesychast controversy at the encouragement of the Empress Anna, by publishing a tract in which he staunchly opposed Gregorius Palamas, the chief supporter of the doctrine. Although he persuaded some prominent churchmen, such as Joseph of Ganos and Arsenios of Tyre, his opinion was opposed to those of Emperor John VI Cantacuzene. Although he presented his views at length at the synod of 1351, that synod declared his views heretical and the doctrines of Palamas orthodox. He and other dissidents were given the opportunity to recant, and he refused. He was then practically imprisoned in a monastery for two years.

=== Campaign against doctrine of Gregorius Palamas ===
Although the doctrine of Gregorius Palamas came to be accepted by the majority of the Orthodox Church, Gregoras persisted in campaigning against what he considered a heretical doctrine forced upon the Church by a robber council. He became a monk and devoted himself to campaigning against the Palamites, destroying his friendship with John Cantacuzene. He was first placed under house arrest, then confined to the Chora Monastery. When he was released from the monastery in 1354, Gregoras returned to his preaching and denunciations. Gregoras devotes two of the 37 books of his Roman History on his objections to the doctrine of Palamas; according to Donald Nicol, "It is disappointing that Gregoras the philosopher and historian should have degenerated into a ranting polemicist in his declining years."

=== Astronomy ===
Gregoras is known to have predicted with exactitude a total solar eclipse on 16 July 1330 using Ptolemy's Handy Tables and Almagest. In astronomy, Gregoras was a pupil of Theodore Metochites.

== Writings ==
Gregoras's chief work is his Roman History, in 37 books, covering the years 1204 to 1359. It partly supplements and partly continues the work of George Pachymeres. Gregoras shows considerable industry, but his style is pompous and affected. This work and that of John Cantacuzene supplement and correct each other, and should be read together.

The other writings of Gregoras, which (with a few exceptions) still remain unpublished, attest his great versatility. Amongst them may be mentioned a history of the dispute with Palamas; biographies of his uncle and early instructor John, metropolitan of Heraclea, and of the martyr Codratus of Antioch; funeral orations for Theodore Metochites, and the two emperors Andronicus; commentaries on the wanderings of Odysseus and on Synesius's treatise on dreams; tracts on orthography and on words of doubtful meaning; a philosophical dialogue called Phlorentius or Concerning Wisdom; astronomical treatises on the date of Easter, on the preparation of the astrolabe and on the predictive calculation of solar eclipses; and an extensive correspondence.

Editions include: Bonn Corpus – Corpus Scriptorum Historiae Byzantinae by L. Schopen and I. Bekker, with life and list of works by J. Boivin (1829–1855); J. P. Migne, Patrologia Graeca, cxlviii., cxlix.; see also Karl Krumbacher, Geschichte der byzantinischen Litteratur (1897).
