= W. T. Purkiser =

Westlake Taylor Purkiser (April 28, 1910–July 18, 1992) was an American preacher, scholar, and author in the Church of the Nazarene.

Purkiser held a PhD from the University of Southern California; he was a lecturer in New Testament Theology at Nazarene Theological Seminary and president of Pasadena College. He was also the editor of Herald of Holiness for 15 years.

Purkiser authored a book entitled The Gifts of the Spirit (Beacon Hill Press:Kansas City. 1975). In the book, Purkiser discussed the ministry of the Holy Spirit in the life of the individual Christian and the gathered congregation of the Church (as understood and practiced within the Wesleyan/Arminian families of the church).

He was married to Arvilla and they had three daughters.

== Works ==
- Know Your Old Testament (1947)
- Some Concepts of the Datum in American Realism (1948)
- Toward a Definition of Christian Education; Inaugural Address Delivered May 31, 1949, Nazarene Memorial Auditorium, Pasadena College Campus (1949)
- Conflicting Concepts of Holiness (1953)
- Exploring the Old Testament (1955) (with C. E. Demaray, Donald S. Metz, Maude A. Stuneck)
- Security: The False and the True (1956)
- The Basis of Religious Authority (1956)
- First Theology Workshop (1958)
- Beliefs that Matter Most (1959)
- Exploring our Christian Faith (1960)
- Adventures in Truth: A Biblical Catechism for Christian Youth (1960)
- Sanctification and its Synonyms: Studies in the Biblical Theology of Holiness (1961)
- Leviticus, Deuteronomy: Leader's Guide (1961)
- Joel, Jonah, Amos, Hosea, and Micah: Leader's Guide (1963)
- The Message of Evangelism: The Saving Power of God (1963)
- Spiritual Gifts, Healing and Tongues: An Analysis of the Charismatic Revival (1964)
- I and II Samuel (1965)
- Search the Scriptures: Old Testament (1967)
- Give Me an Answer: Significant Questions Selected from "The Answer Corner" of the Herald of Holiness (1968)
- The New Testament Image of the Ministry (1969)
- Genesis (1969)
- Survey of the Old Testament (1968)
- Search the Scriptures: Old Testament (1969)
- Search the Scriptures; Bible Study Plan, Church of the Nazarene (1965-1970)
- Is There a Prayer Language? (1971)
- Interpreting Christian Holiness (1971)
- God, Man & Salvation: A Biblical Theology (1971, 1977)
- Adventures in Bible Doctrine (1972)
- The Church in a Changing World: A Symposium (1973)
- When You Get to the End of Yourself (1973)
- The Paradox of Prayer (1974)
- Our Wonderful World (1974)
- God's Spirit in Today's World (1974)
- Hebrews, James, Peter (1974)
- The Gifts of the Spirit (1975)
- What is Eternal Security? (1960-1975)
- Psalms (1980)
- Called Unto Holiness: Volume 2: The Second Twenty-Five Years, 1933-58 (1983)
- Exploring Christian Holiness (with Paul M. Bassett and William M. Greathouse) (1983-1985)
- These Earthen Vessels: The Christian and His failures, Foibles, and Infirmities (1985)
- The Lordship of Jesus: A Study in Christian Discipleship (1986)
- A Primer on Prayer (1987)
- Holiness as Crisis and Growth (n.d.)
- Christmas Joy: God's Silent Gifts (n.d.)
- Thanksgiving: The Memory of the Heart (n.d.)
- The Meaning of Thanksgiving (n.d.)
