= Arsenius of Tyre =

Eastern orthodox theologian

- Born: c. 14th-century Likely Byzantine Empire
- Years active: fl. 1351–1376

Arsenius (Greek: Ἀρσένιος, romanized: Arsénios; fl. 1351–1376), was an Eastern Orthodox prelate and theologian.

He is first mentioned in 1351, at Constantinople. At the time he was already Metropolitan of Tyre and Sidon, and controlled the Hodegon Monastery in the Byzantine capital. A fervent anti-Palamite, he wrote an appeal for his position to Emperor John VI Kantakouzenos and participated in the 1351 synod at Constantinople on Palamas' Hesychast doctrine. After the Palamite victory, he left the city, but before leaving, he consecrated the historian and fellow anti-Palamite Nikephoros Gregoras as a monk. Despite the publication of three minor anti-Palamite polemics in 1360, he had returned to Constantinople by 1361, before leaving for a stay in Cyprus (1361/62). From 1366 to 1376, he was a rival Patriarch of Antioch against the incumbent Pachomius, seeking to expand his jurisdiction against the Patriarchate of Constantinople.

== Sources ==
- Trapp, Erich; Beyer, Hans-Veit; Walther, Rainer; Sturm-Schnabl, Katja; Kislinger, Ewald; Leontiadis, Ioannis; Kaplaneres, Sokrates (1976–1996). Prosopographisches Lexikon der Palaiologenzeit (in German). Vienna: Verlag der Österreichischen Akademie der Wissenschaften. ISBN 3-7001-3003-1.
