= Henry C. Sheldon =

American Methodist theologian and writer

Henry Clay Sheldon (March 12, 1845 – August 4, 1928), best known as Henry C. Sheldon, was an American Methodist theologian and writer.

== Early life ==
Sheldon was born in Martinsburg, New York. He received his B.A. in 1867 and his M.A. in 1870 from Yale University. He was a pastor at two Methodist churches, in St. Johnsbury, Vermont from 1871 to 1872 and in Brunswick, Maine from 1872 to 1874. Later, though primarily a scholar and writer, he continued to preach occasionally.

== Education ==
In 1874-1875 he studied at Leipzig University. When he returned to America in 1875, he was elected Professor of Systematic Theology at Boston University, where he remained until his retirement in 1921.

== Career ==
Sheldon was a prolific author of books about Christian history and comparative religions. He was critical of the ideas of New Thought and Theosophy.

== Personal life ==
In 1875, he married Mary Louise McLellan. They had two sons.

== Publications ==
- History of Christian Doctrine (Volume 1, Volume 2, Volume 3, Volume 4, Volume 5, 1886)
- History of the Christian Church (Volume 1, Volume 2, 1894)
- Unbelief in the Nineteenth Century: A Critical History (1907)
- Sacerdotalism in the Nineteenth Century: A Critical History (1909)
- New Testament Theology (1911)
- Theological Encyclopaedia: A Brief Account of the Organism and Literature of Theology (1911)
- Christian Science So-Called: An Exposition and an Estimate (1913)
- A Fourfold Test of Mormonism (1914)
- Studies in Recent Adventism (1915)
- Theosophy and New Thought (1916)
- The Mystery Religions and the New Testament (1918)
- Pantheistic Dilemmas and Other Essays in Philosophy and Religion (1920)
- The Essentials of Christianity (1922)
