= Randy L. Maddox =

American theologian and United Methodist minister

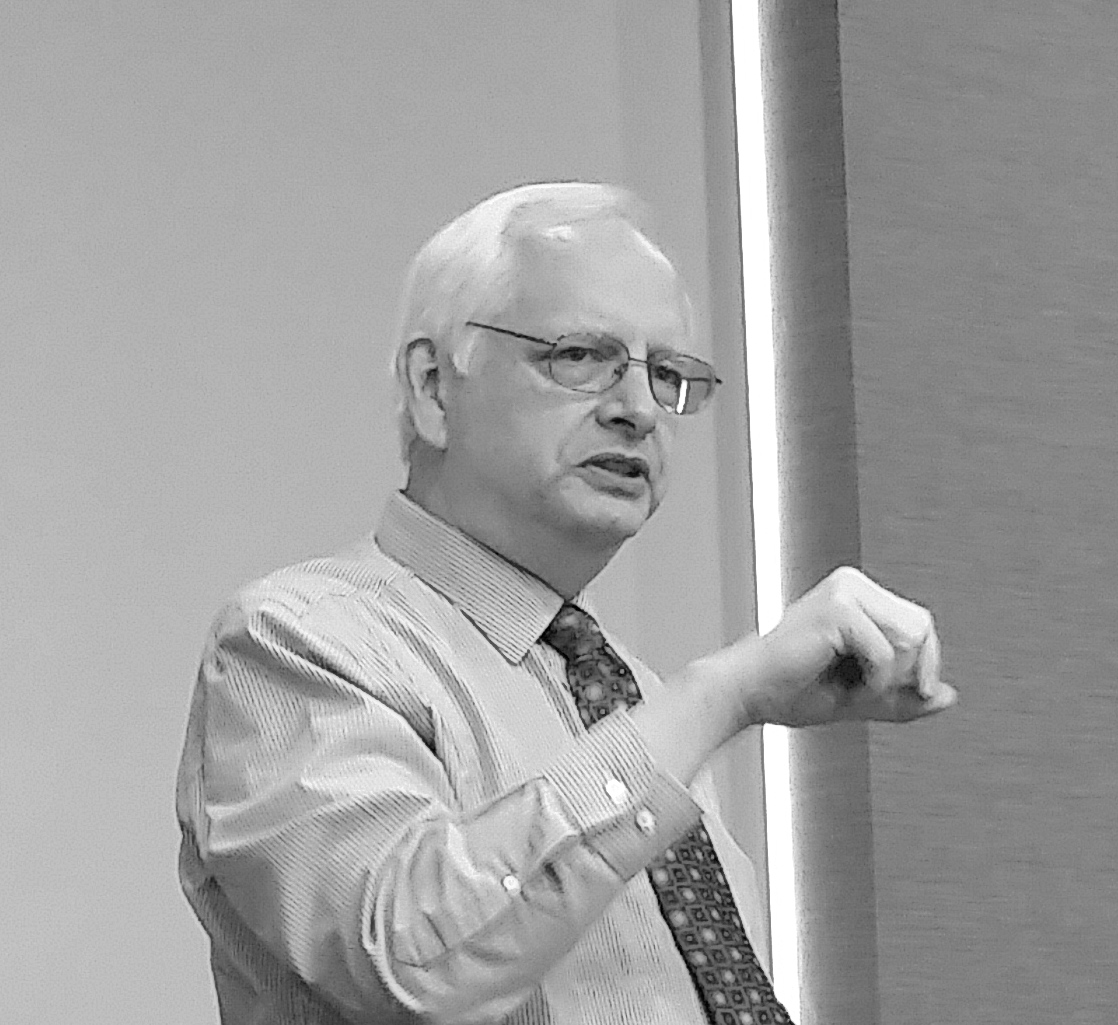
- Dr. Randy Maddox speaking at the Wesleyan Theological Society meeting in Mt. Vernon, Ohio, in March 2015
- Education: BA, M.Div., Ph.D.
- Alma mater: Northwest Nazarene University; Nazarene Theological Seminary; Emory University
- Occupation: Professor
- Known for: Wesleyan Theology
- Title: William Kellon Quick Professor of Wesleyan and Methodist Studies, Duke Divinity School
- Term: July 2005-2020

Randy L. Maddox (born 1953) is an American theologian and ordained minister in the United Methodist Church. He served until 2020 as the William Kellon Quick Professor of Wesleyan and Methodist Studies at Duke University. Maddox also serves as the General Editor of the Wesley Works Project, a major scholarly project responsible for producing the first comprehensive and critical edition of the works of John Wesley. He is considered one of the leading authorities on both the theology of John Wesley (1703-1791) and the theological developments of later Methodism.

== Education ==
Maddox attended Northwest Nazarene College in Nampa, ID, graduating with a B.A. degree in 1975. He went on to earn the M.Div. degree from Nazarene Theological Seminary in Kansas City, MO, in 1978. In 1982, he graduated with a Ph.D. in theological studies from Emory University.

== Career ==
After receiving the Ph.D degree from Emory University, the early years of Maddox's scholarly career were spent at Sioux Falls College in Sioux Falls, SD (now the University of Sioux Falls). While in Sioux Falls, Maddox also taught at North American Baptist Seminary (now Sioux Falls Seminary). In 1998, he joined the faculty of Seattle Pacific University as the Paul T. Walls Professor of Wesleyan Theology, a position he held for seven years.

Maddox joined the faculty of Duke Divinity School at Duke University in 2005.

== Contributions to Wesleyan Theology ==
=== Responsible Grace ===
The publication in 1994 of Responsible Grace: John Wesley’s Practical Theology established Maddox as one of the foremost interpreters of the Wesleyan tradition. Maddox's work in Responsible Grace is noteworthy in aligning John Wesley's theological concerns related to the doctrine of salvation with themes characteristic of the Eastern (or Greek) Christian tradition. According to Maddox, the Western juridical tendencies in Wesley's theology (sin as guilt, grace as pardon, and salvation as being from the penalty of sin) are couched in a larger framework that owes more to an Eastern therapeutic view (sin as disease, grace as power for healing, salvation as being from the plague of sin). In advancing this view of Wesley's doctrine of salvation, Maddox emphasizes the importance of sanctification within Wesley's conception of the via salutis (or “way of salvation”) as an ongoing form of spiritual maturation or growth.

Maddox also brings clarity to the understanding of Wesley's theological method by describing his approach as guided by an abiding “orienting concern.” He names this orienting concern as “responsible grace,” a term that sums up many of the major dynamics of Wesley's doctrine of grace as they relate to God's initiative in salvation and the human response to God. He describes the concept of responsible grace as “an abiding concern to preserve the vital tension between two truths that [Wesley] viewed as co-definitive of Christianity: without God’s grace, we cannot be saved; while without our (grace-empowered, but uncoerced) participation, God’s grace will not save.”

=== The Nature of Practical Theology and John Wesley as Practical Theologian ===
Beyond its interpretation of Wesley's soteriology, Responsible Grace also identifies John Wesley as a “practical theologian.” Maddox developed this idea for several years prior to the publication of Responsible Grace, having become convinced that the traditional dismissal of Wesley's theological writing within the academy was the result of a fundamental misunderstanding of the nature of his work. Rather than judging Wesley according to the canons of systematic theology, Maddox argues that he ought to be seen as engaging in practical theology—which he defines as a form of reflection that seeks “to unify the various theological concerns (tradition, Scripture, experience, reason, etc.) around the common focus of norming Christian praxis.” From this understanding of the nature of practical theology, Maddox subsequently posited the notion of the “orienting concern” as the way in which consistency in theological claims is measured.

In interpreting Wesley as a practical theologian, Maddox suggests that he resembles the early church fathers of the first few centuries of the Christian era (rather than the systematic theologians of the 19th and 20th centuries). Wesley's theology is occasional and contextual, geared to address specific challenges and problems of the Christian life. It is typically expressed in genres such as sermons, liturgies, hymns, pastoral letters, catechetical works, and doctrinal essays. Maddox argues that such theological activity ought not be seen as a lower or less important expression of theology than the highly technical theology of the modern academy. Rather, practical theology as Maddox describes it is the most characteristic mode of theology in that it is intimately connected to Christian worship and the life of discipleship. Reading Wesley as a theologian in this guise means engaging Wesley's theology on its own terms—as a type of serious theological reflection engaged with the context and practice of the Christian life.

=== Holistic Salvation ===
In recent years, Maddox has advanced the understanding of Wesley's doctrine of salvation as it pertains to bodily health and wholeness. Modern day readers of Wesley's Primitive Physick—a manual of medical advice and folk remedies for common illnesses—often view many of its suggested “cures” as humorous. Maddox, on the other hand, has emphasized the way in which Wesley's concern for bodily health is reflective of his understanding of salvation as intended for human life in the present and as encompassing both body and soul. For Wesley, Maddox argues, the reason one would take care of one's physical health is intimately related to God's desire to save whole persons. Maddox also emphasizes the way in which the Wesleyan concern for holistic salvation influenced Wesley's eschatological views as well, which has consequences both for his understanding of the New Creation as well as the place of the animal kingdom within it.

=== The Wesley Works Project & The Center for Studies in the Wesleyan Tradition ===
Beginning in 1960, Methodist scholars began pursuing the development of a comprehensive and critical edition of John Wesley's corpus of writing. Currently housed in the Center for Studies in the Wesleyan Tradition at Duke Divinity School, the Wesley Works Editorial Project is engaged in the publication of a projected 35-volume edition of the Bicentennial Edition of the Works of John Wesley. Abingdon Press is serving as the publisher for the series.

In 2003, Maddox was named as the Associate General Editor for the Wesley Works Project; and in 2014 became General Editor. He also serves as a fellow of the Center for Studies in the Wesleyan Tradition. In his capacity as the Associate General Editor, Maddox has editorial oversight of the individual volumes currently in research or production. He has personally edited Doctrinal and Controversial Treatises I in 2012, which is Volume 12 in the series and covers aspects of the theological stance of John Wesley in the area of soteriology. For his work on this volume, Maddox received the 2013 Saddlebag Selection Award from the Historical Society of the United Methodist Church, given to "the outstanding book on United Methodist history or a related subject published during a given year."

Maddox's role as a fellow in the Center for Studies in the Wesleyan Tradition has also included significant historical work with Charles Wesley's poetry and hymnody. A five-year project under Maddox's leadership was completed in 2012 that successfully compiled all the known verse from Charles Wesley's pen, both published and unpublished. This comprehensive collection of Charles Wesley's hymns and poems is the first of its kind and is intended to serve as a resource both for the study of Charles Wesley's theology and the hymnody of the Methodist tradition.

=== Theology for the Church ===
While Maddox's scholarly work has primarily been focused on the interpretation of John Wesley and the later Methodist tradition (and so falls under the heading of historical theology), he has also consistently attempted to translate that work as a resource for contemporary Christian practice. In this sense, Maddox serves as one of the standard bearers for the "neo-Wesleyan revival", which features renewed interest in the theology of John Wesley and the practices of early Methodism amongst Methodists and other Wesleyans from the 1960s to the present.

== Notable Influences ==
Maddox studied under Theodore Runyon at Emory University, a notable Wesleyan theologian and the author of The New Creation: John Wesley’s Theology Today. Runyon was the Emeritus Professor of Systematic Theology at Emory University's Candler School of Theology.

Many aspects of Maddox's interpretation of Wesley are developments of themes originally identified by Albert C. Outler (1908-1989), the influential Methodist ecumenist, theologian, and church leader of the 20th century. Some of these include the identification of Wesley as a “folk theologian,” the conviction that Wesley can be seen as a theological mentor for contemporary Christian practice, the conviction that Wesley's theology bears strong resembles to the Eastern Christian tradition, and the methodological construct known as Outler's Quadrilateral.

== Bibliography ==
1984. Toward an Ecumenical Fundamental Theology (Chico, CA: Scholar's Press).

1990. (Ed.) Aldersgate Reconsidered (Nashville: Kingswood Books).

1994. Responsible Grace: John Wesley’s Practical Theology (Nashville: Kingswood Books).

1997. (Co-author with W. Stephen Gunter, Ted A. Campbell, Scott J. Jones, and Rebekah L. Miles) Wesley and the Quadrilateral: Renewing the Conversation (Nashville: Abingdon Press).

1998. (Ed.) Rethinking John Wesley’s Theology for Contemporary Methodism (Nashville: Kingswood Books).

2010. (Ed. with Jason E. Vickers) The Cambridge Companion to John Wesley (Cambridge: Cambridge University Press).

2012. (Ed.) Doctrinal and Controversial Treatises I, Volume 12 of the Bicentennial Edition of the Works of John Wesley (Nashville: Abingdon Press).

2015. (Ed. with Paul W. Chilcote) A Plain Account of Christian Perfection (Kansas City: Beacon Hill).

2018. (Ed.) The Journal Letters and Related Biographical Items of The Rev. Charles Wesley, M.A. (Nashville: Kingswood Books).

2018. (Ed. with James Donat) Medical and Health Writings, Volume 32 of the Bicentennial Edition of the Works of John Wesley(Nashville: Abingdon).

2022. (Ed. with S. H. Lancaster & K. D. Yates) Doctrinal and Controversial Treatises III, Volume 14 of the Bicentennial Edition of the Works of John Wesley (Nashville: Abingdon).

2023. (Ed.) Letters IV, 1766–73, Volume 28 of the Bicentennial Edition of the Works of John Wesley (Nashville: Abingdon).

2023. (Ed.) Letters V, 1774–81, Volume 29 of the Bicentennial Edition of the Works of John Wesley (Nashville: Abingdon).

2024. (Ed.) Letters VI, 1782–88, Volume 30 of the Bicentennial Edition of the Works of John Wesley (Nashville: Abingdon).

2024. (Ed.) Letters VII, 1789–89, Volume 31 of the Bicentennial Edition of the Works of John Wesley (Nashville: Abingdon).

A full list of Maddox's publications, and access to digital copies of most, is available through the Divinity Archives at Duke Divinity School
