= Isaac Jacquelot =

French minister (1647–1708)

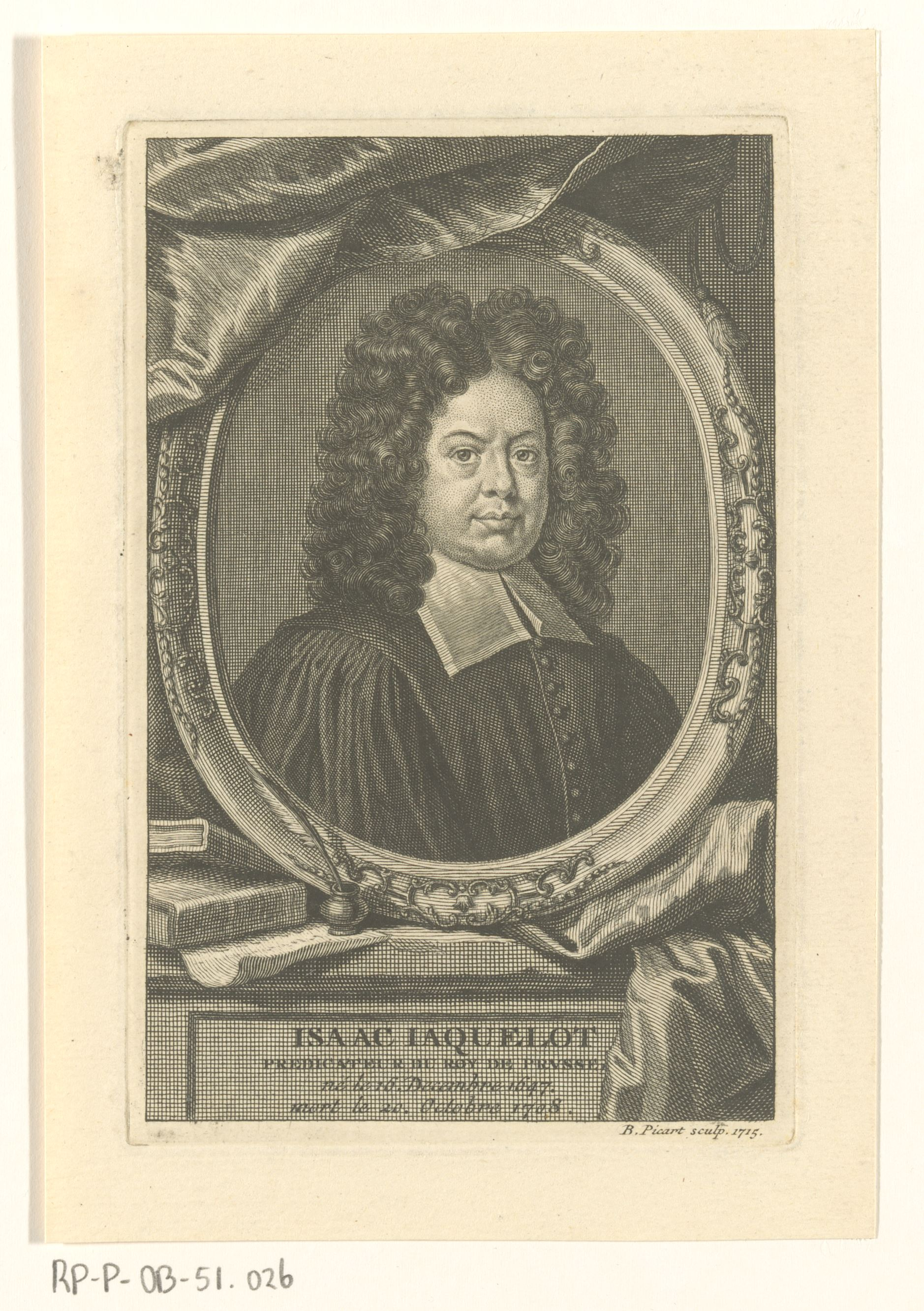
Isaac Jacquelot

Isaac Jacquelot (December 1647 in Vassy, France – 15 October 1708 in Berlin, Germany) was a French Huguenot minister.

== Life ==
Isaac Jacquelot was born in Vassy in Champagne, where his father was a Calvinist minister. He took over his father's position but left France in 1685 on the Revocation of the Edict of Nantes. He went to Heidelberg for a year and then took a position with a Walloon congregation at The Hague. He then left for Basel after finding himself in conflict with Pierre Jurieu.

He ended his life as a court preacher in Berlin.

== Views ==
Jacquelot was a leading figure in the rationaux, the Huguenot proponents of rational theology. Along with Jean Le Clerc and Jacques Bernard, they looked for reason and faith to come into balance and supported religious tolerance. They found themselves opposing Pierre Bayle after 1700.

Jacquelot supported Anthonie van Dale's rejection of the supernatural, as did Le Clerc, with some qualification. Their positions, with that of Benjamin Binet, marked out the moderate rationalism of the first half of the 18th century.

On theodicy, Isaac Jacquelot agreed with Gottfried Leibniz in Jacquelot's Conformité. On the other hand, he considered Leibniz's solution to the mind-body problem to be a less powerful variation on occasionalism. The two met in Berlin in 1702. Leibniz replied with his doctrine of pre-established harmony, which Jacquelot criticised on grounds of free will in a projected appendix to the Conformité, the Système abrégé de l'âme et de la liberté. After negotiation, the Système abrégé appeared in a modified form.

Jacquelot used an argument from design in his Dissertations sur l'existence de Dieu, defending divine providence and revealed religion: observation can and will support the purposive nature of the creation of animals and man. His exposition was much read subsequently.

== Controversies ==
Jacquelot attacked the system of Benedict Spinoza, as did Samuel Clarke, by taking aim at what were perceived as key propositions in it.

During his time in Berlin, Jacquelot engaged in a final controversy with Pierre Bayle, who died in 1706 while the debate proceeded; he had frequently accused Bayle of declaring reason and faith incompatible by fiat. One contentious topic was the article on Manichaeism in Bayle's Dictionary. As part of the exchanges, Jacquelot declared in favour of Remonstrant (Arminian) views. Philippe Naudé attacked Jacquelot and Jean Le Clerc and defended absolute predestination in his La souveraine perfection de Dieu (Sovereign Perfections of God) (1708).

Jonathan I. Israel has characterised the outcome of the debate between Bayle and the rationaux as a serious setback for the latter. Jacquelot and Le Clerc were criticised by Jean-Nicolas-Hubert Hayer. The weakness in their approach, from a Christian perspective, was to claim too much for reason.

== Works ==
- Avis sur le tableau du socinianisme, [S.I.], 1690.
- De Jesus Christ, qu’il est le Messie et le vrai Dieu, La Haye: Abraham Troyel 1692.
- Dissertations sur l'existence de Dieu, La Haye, 1697.
- Histoire des souffrances du bien-heureux martyr Mr. Louis de Marolles, La Haye 1699, (edited by Jaquelot).
- Dissertations sur le Messie, où l'on prouve aux Juifs que Jesus-Christ est le Messie promis et predit dans l'Ancien Testament (1699). This work arose from Jacquelot's contacts with Sephardi Jews in The Hague. A long response was made by Abraham Gómez Silveira, and it was attacked in the Messias Restaurado of Jacob de Andrade Velosino.
- Conformité de la foi avec la raison: ou défense de la religion, contre les principales difficultez répandues dans le Dictionaire historique et critique de Mr. Bayle, Amsterdam, 1705, reprint: Hildesheim: Georg Olms, 2006.
- Examen de la theologie de Mr. Bayle [Texte imprimé], répandue dans son Dictionnaire critique, dans ses Pensées sur les cométes, & dans ses Réponses à un provincial; où l'on defend la Conformité de la foi avec la raison, contre sa Réponse, Amsterdam, 1706.
- Réponse aux Entretiens composez par M. Bayle, contre la conformité de la foi avec la raison, et l'Examen de sa théologie, Amsterdam, 1707.
- Sermons sur divers textes, Amsterdam: Jaques Desbordes 1710, vol. 1, 1732, vol. 2.
- Traité de la vérité et de l'inspiration des livres du Vieux et du Nouveau Testament, Rotterdam, 1715.
- Dissertations sur l'existence de Dieu. Nouvelle édition, augmentée de la Vie de l'auteur [par l'abbé Pérau] et de quelques lettres [de Jaquelot et Des Maizeaux au sujet du livre de M. Werenfels intitulé: Judicium de argumento Cartesii pro existentia Dei petito ab ejus idea], Paris 1744.
