= Keith Drury (theologian) =

American pastor (1945-2024)

Keith Drury (July 28, 1945 – April 7, 2024) was a pastor, denominational leader, and eventually a professor of theology and ministry at Indiana Wesleyan University. Drury spent more than twenty years (1971-1988, 1990-1996) in denominational leadership for the Wesleyan Church establishing key denominational programs of spiritual formation especially for children and youth. As a writer through 2010, he spoke to pastors and church leaders on a variety of popular and scholarly ministry topics and is perhaps best known for his Tuesday Column blog, a series of articles published from 1995 through 2012 targeted towards Wesleyan pastors and church leaders. Drury also published numerous books such as The Call of a Lifetime (2013), SoulShaper (2013), Common Ground (2008), The Story of the Wesleyan Church (2018), There Is No I in Church (2006), The Wonder of Worship (2002), With Unveiled Faces (2005), Walking the Trail of Death (2008), Spiritual Disciplines for Ordinary People (2004), Canoeing the Missouri River (1999), and his beloved classic, Holiness for Ordinary People (1984, 2009). Drury's writings included forays into practical theology, spiritual formation, and outdoor adventure writing. In spite of all of his writing and speaking, he counted his mentoring relationships as his most significant contribution.

Keith Drury died on April 7, 2024 while living in Brookville, Florida following a health incident that occurred while attending his local church. He was survived by Sharon, his wife of many years and his children: David Drury and John Drury.
