= Francisco de Vargas y Mejía =

Spanish diplomat and ecclesiastical writer

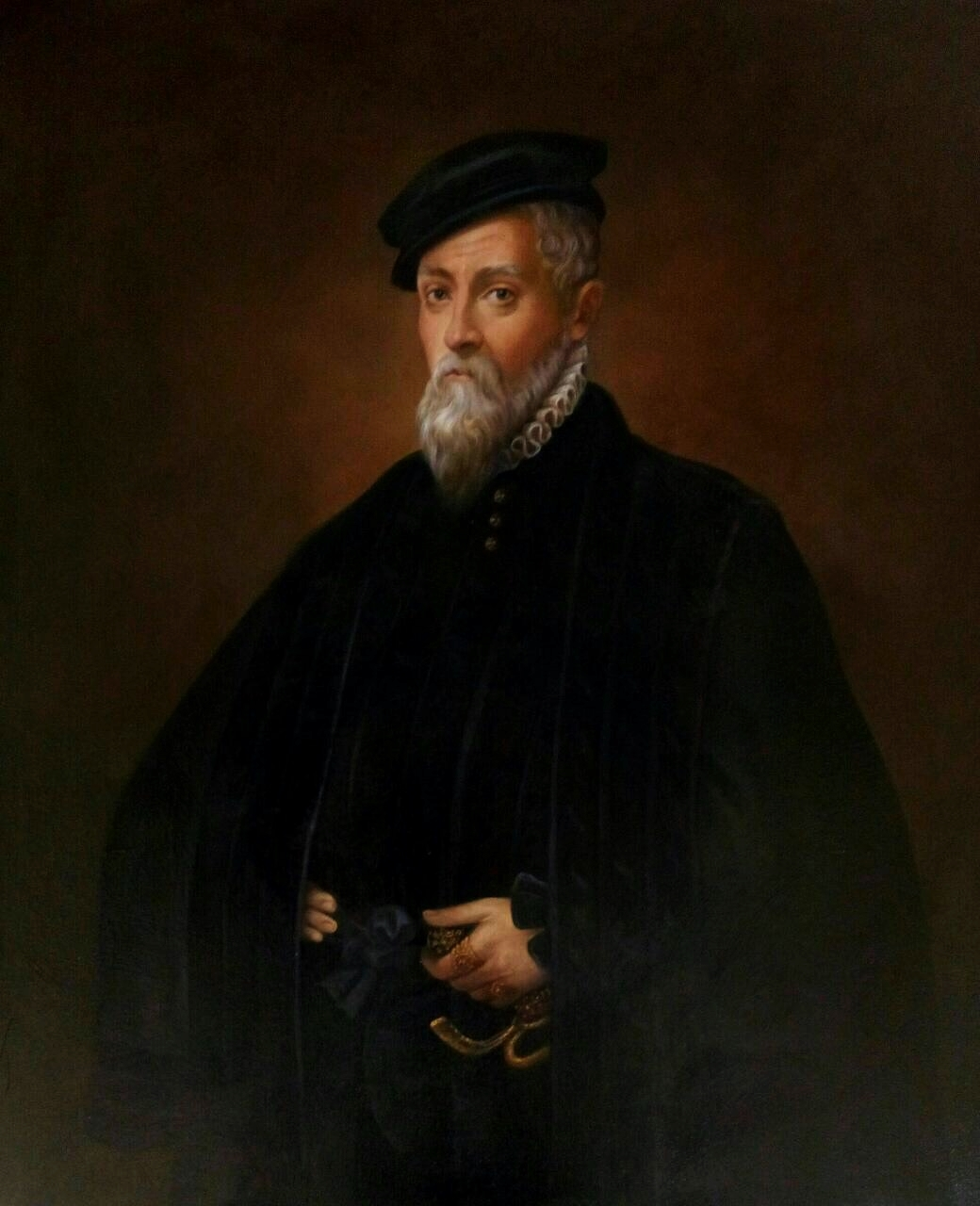
- copy of painting by Titian

Francisco de Vargas y Mejía (b. Madrid, 1500; d. at the Hieronymite monastery of la Cisla in 20 April 1566) was a Spanish diplomat and ecclesiastical writer.

== Biography ==
He belonged to an old family of the lower nobility and studied law at the University of Alcalá, receiving the degree of licentiate in law. He became a government official, and by his energy and education, especially by his knowledge of law, rose to the position of fiscal of the Council of Castile (Fiscal del Consejos de Castilla), that is, attorney-general. In 1545, Charles V, Holy Roman Emperor, sent him to the Council of Trent. In January, 1548, he protested, as Charles's representative at the council, against its transfer to Bologna, and in 1551 he congratulated the council on its return to Trent.

During the years 1552-59 he was the Spanish ambassador in Venice, and during 1559-62 to the Holy See.

Writing after King Philip II of Spain had decided to declare war against the pope, he wrote in a letter to the Princess Dowager of Portugal, Regent of Spain, dated 22 September 1556:

I have reported to your Highness what has been happening here, and how far the Pope is going in his fury and vain imaginings. His Majesty could not do otherwise than have a care for his reputation and dominions. I am sure your Highness will have had more recent news from the Duke of Alva, who has taken the field with an excellent army and has penetrated so far into the Pope's territory that his cavalry is raiding up to ten miles from Rome, where there is such panic that the population would have run away had not the gates been closed. The Pope has fallen ill with rage, and was struggling with a fever on the 16th of this month. The two Carafa brothers, the Cardinal and Count Montorio, do not agree, and they and Piero Strozzi are not on as good terms as they were in the past. They would like to discuss peace. The best thing would be for the Pope to die, for he is the poison at the root of all this trouble and more which may occur. His Majesty's intention is only to wrest the knife from this madman's hand and make him return to a sense of his dignity, acting like the protector of the Apostolic See, in whose name, and that of the College of Cardinals, his Majesty has publicly proclaimed that he has seized all he is occupying. The Pope is now sending again to the potentates of Italy for help. I hope he will gain as little thereby as he has done in the past, and that the French will calm down. May God give us peace in the end, as their Majesties desire and deserve!

In 1558, he negotiated at Rome with Paul IV regarding the recognition of Ferdinand I as emperor, and in references to the founding of new dioceses in the Netherlands. From 1559 he succeeded Juan de Figueroa as the Spanish ambassador to the Roman Curia. As such he took an important part in the election of Pius IV. When Pius IV brought suit against the relatives of Paul IV, Vargas exerted himself to save the Caraffa. For some time he was not regarded favorably by the pope, who tried to have him recalled by Spain. However, Vargas again obtained the confidence of Pius IV, and was commissioned by the latter in 1563 to prepare an opinion on the question of the papal jurisdiction, as to which the Council of Trent had become involved in a dispute.

The document Vargas prepared was published at Rome in the same year under the title of De episcoporum jurisdictione et de pontificis maximi auctoritate responsum. In this Vargas speaks as a strict supporter of the papacy. Another theological question that he took up was that of granting the cup to the laity. To this he was decidedly opposed. His reports and letters contain important information on the doings of the Council of Trent, but he cannot be regarded as an entirely unprejudiced witness, because his interest was that of a diplomat in the service of his king. He was prominent in the affairs of the council for the last time when, in conjunction with the Spanish ambassador at Trent, he tried to postpone the close of the council. After his return to Spain he was made state councillor, but soon resigned all his offices and retired to the Hieronymite monastery of la Cisla near Toledo, in order to prepare himself for death. His contemporaries praised him as a highly educated man and a patron of learning.
