= Kenneth J. Collins =

American theologian (born 1952)

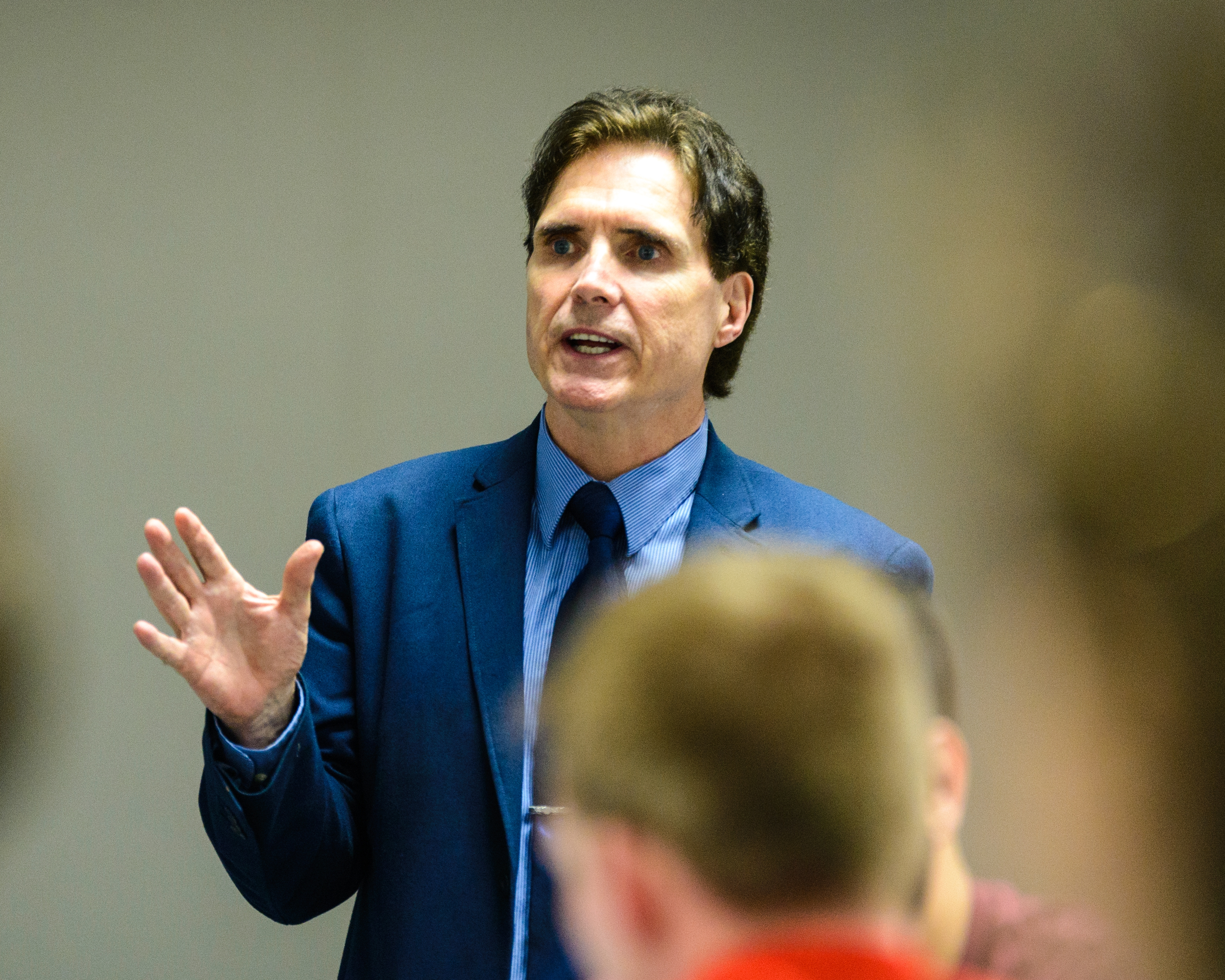
- Born: 1952 (age 73–74)
- Education: State University of New York at Buffalo (B.A.); Asbury Theological Seminary (M.Div.); Princeton Seminary (Th.M.); Drew University (Ph.D.)
- Occupation: Professor
- Known for: Wesleyan Theology
- Title: Professor of Historical Theology and Wesley Studies
- Term: 1995-present

Kenneth J. Collins (born 1952) is an American Wesleyan theologian and ordained minister in the Global Methodist Church. He is a professor of Historical Theology and Wesley Studies at Asbury Theological Seminary. He is a leader in Wesley Studies, and his work The Theology of John Wesley: Holy Love and the Shape of Grace has been translated into Portuguese, Korean and Mandarin Chinese. He is the Director of the Wesleyan Studies Summer Seminar.

He received the Smith/Wynkoop Book Award in March 2024 for his book, edited with Ryan Danker, The Next Methodism: Theological, Social, and Missional Foundations for Global Methodism, and the same award in March 2016 for his earlier book, The Works of John Wesley: Doctrinal and Controversial Treatises II. Vol. 13 (co-edited with Paul W. Chilcote). Both awards were bestowed by the Wesleyan Theological Society. Collins has lectured in England, Russia, South Korea, Japan, Australia, Estonia, Brazil and Costa Rica.

== Education ==
Collins attended the State University of New York at Buffalo, receiving a Bachelor of Arts in 1974. He went on to earn a Master of Divinity (M.Div.) degree from Asbury Theological Seminary in 1979, and a Master of Theology from Princeton Seminary in 1980. In 1982 he received a Master of Philosophy from Drew University and achieved a Ph.D. in Theological and Religious Studies in 1984.

== Career ==
After receiving his doctorate, Collins began his career in 1984 as a College Chaplain and two years later was appointed Assistant Professor of Religion and Philosophy at Methodist College (now Methodist University) in Fayetteville, North Carolina. In 1995 he joined the faculty of Asbury Theological Seminary as a Professor of Historical Theology and Wesley Studies. In 2008 he received the Professor of the Year Award for Excellence in Teaching and Learning at this institution.

As of October 2011 he serves on the board of the think-tank Institute on Religion and Democracy.

== Contributions to Wesleyan Theology ==
The publication in 2007 of The Theology of John Wesley: Holy Love and the Shape of Grace broke new ground in the field of Wesley studies and established Collins as one of the most reliable interpreters of the Theology of John Wesley, gaining him broad international recognition. Collins creatively argued that Wesley's theology could suitably be summarized in terms of the larger axial theme of "holiness and grace" with each of these elements representing an artful and carefully drawn balance, that is, holiness as "holy love” and grace as both "free and co-operant." This sophisticated recognition led to the key insight that Wesley's practical theology had a distinct fingerprint as evidenced in the contours of grace actualized in the warp and woof of disciplined Christian life.

== Published works ==
=== Wesleyan Theology ===
- 1989. Wesley on Salvation: A Study in the Standard Sermons. Grand Rapids: Francis Asbury Press of Zondervan Publishing House.
- 1993. A Faithful Witness: John Wesley's Homiletical Theology. Wilmore, Kentucky: Wesley Heritage Press.
- 1997. The Scripture Way of Salvation: The Heart of John Wesley's Theology. Nashville: Abingdon Press.
- 1999. A Real Christian: The Life of John Wesley. Nashville: Abingdon Press.
- 2001. (Co-editor with John H. Tyson) Conversion in the Wesleyan Tradition. Nashville: Abingdon Press.
- 2003. John Wesley: A Theological Journey. Nashville: Abingdon Press.
- 2007. The Theology of John Wesley: Holy Love and the Shape of Grace. Nashville: Abingdon Press.
- 2013. (Co-editor with Paul Wesley Chilcote) The Works of John Wesley: Doctrinal and Controversial Treatises II. Vol. 13. Nashville: Abingdon Press.
- 2013. (Co-editor with Jason Vickers) The Sermons of John Wesley: A Collection for the Christian Journey. Nashville: Abingdon Press.
- 2019. A Wesley Bibliography. Wilmore, Kentucky: First Fruits Press.
- 2020 (Co-editor with Rob Wall) Wesley One Volume Commentary. Nashville: Abingdon Press.
- 2022 (Co-editor with Ryan N. Danker) The Next Methodism: Theological, Social and Missional Foundations for Global Methodism. Seedbed Publishing.
- 2025 Generous Divine Love: The Grace and Power of Methodist Theology. Nashville, Tennessee: Abingdon Press.

=== American Evangelical Studies ===
- 2005. The Evangelical Moment: The Promise of an American Religion. Grand Rapids, Michigan: Baker Academic.
- 2012. Power, Politics and the Fragmentation of Evangelicalism: From the Scopes Trial to the Obama Administration. Downers Grove, Illinois: InterVarsity Press.

=== Christian Spirituality ===
- 2000. Exploring Christian Spirituality: An Ecumenical Reader. Grand Rapids, Michigan: Baker Books.
- 2014. Soul Care: Deliverance and Renewal through the Christian Life. Wilmore, Kentucky: First Fruits Press.

=== Ecumenical Studies ===
- 2017. (Co-author with Jerry L. Walls) Roman but Not Catholic: What Remains at Stake 500 Years after the Reformation. Grand Rapids, Michigan: Baker Academic.

=== Biblical Studies ===
- 2020. (Co-editor with Robert W. Wall) Wesley One Volume Commentary. Nashville, Tennessee: Abingdon Press.
- 2021. Jesus the Stranger: The Man from Galilee and the Light of the World. Franklin, Tennessee: Seedbed Publishing.
