= Hell in Christianity =

Christian views on Hell

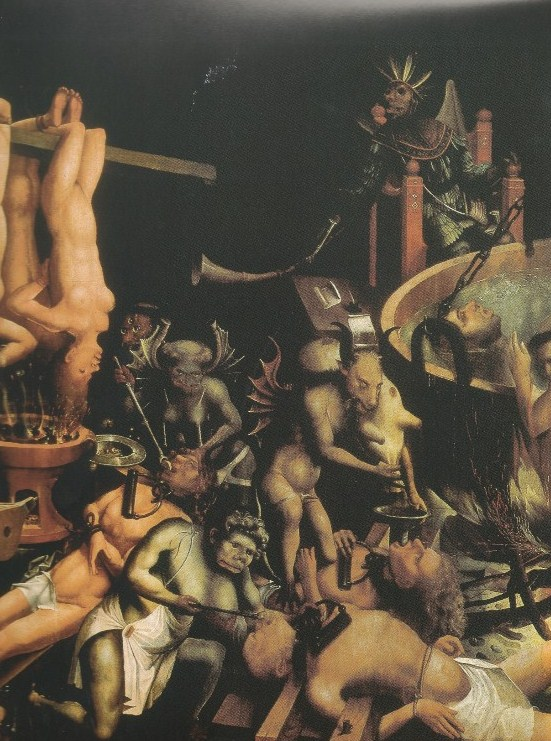
A detail from Hieronymus Bosch's depiction of Hell (16th century)

In some versions of Christian theology, Hell is the place or state into which, by God's definitive judgment, unrepentant sinners pass in the general judgment, or, as some Christians believe, immediately after death as a result of a person's choice to be separated from God (particular judgment). Its character is inferred from teaching in the biblical texts, some of which, interpreted literally, have given rise to the popular idea of Hell. Some theologians see Hell as the consequence of rejecting union with God.

Different Hebrew and Greek words are translated as "Hell" in most English-language Christian Bibles. These words include:

- "Sheol" (Biblical Hebrew: שְׁאוֹל, romanized: Šəʾōl) in the Hebrew Bible (Old Testament), and "Hades" in the New Testament. Some modern versions, such as the New International Version, translate Sheol as "grave" and transliterate "Hades". Some denominations, like the Jehovah's Witnesses, believe that these refer to a state of complete unconsciousness. It is generally agreed that both Sheol and Hades typically refer to the grave, the temporary abode of the dead, the underworld.
- "Gehenna", in the New Testament, in which it is described as a place where both soul and body can be destroyed (Matthew 10:28) in "unquenchable fire" (Mark 9:43). The word is often translated as "Hell", but it is sometimes transliterated as Gehenna.. Gehenna, referenced in Joshua 18:16, Jeremiah 7:31, Jeremiah 19:2, and Jeremiah 19:6 in the Hebrew Bible, Rosh Hashanah 17a:3 and Shabbat 33b:7 in the Talmud, and Shemot Rabbah 2:2 and Bereshit Rabbah 48:8 in the Midrash, was a physical location situated outside the city walls of Jerusalem.
- The Greek verb ταρταρῶ (tartarō, derived from Tartarus), which occurs once in the New Testament (in 2 Peter 2:4), is almost always translated by a phrase such as "thrown down to hell". A few translations render it as "Tartarus"; of this term, the Holman Christian Standard Bible states: "Tartarus is a Greek name for a subterranean place of divine punishment lower than Hades."

== Jewish background ==
Initially in ancient Jewish belief, the dead were consigned to Sheol, a place to which all were sent indiscriminately. Sheol was thought of as a place situated below the ground—a place of darkness, silence, and forgetfulness. By the third or second century BC, the idea had evolved to encompass separate divisions in Sheol for the righteous and wicked, as in the Book of Enoch.

By the Savoraic or early Geonic parts of the Rabbinic period (500–640 AD), Gehinnom was viewed as the place of ultimate punishment, as Rabbi Yehudah is recorded teaching in Kiddushin 82a:8: "[Even] the best of physicians is to Gehenna, and [even] the fittest of butchers is a partner of Amalek." It is also noted as such in the earlier apocryphal Assumption of Moses and 2 Esdras.

== New Testament ==
Three different New Testament words appear in most English translations as "Hell":

Greek NT	NT occurrences	KJV	NKJV	NASB	NIV	ESV	CEV	NLT
ᾅδης (Hades)	9	Hell (9/10)	Hades (10/10)	Hades (9/9)	Hades (7/9 or 4/9)	Hades (8/9)	death's kingdom (3/9)	grave (6/9)
γέεννα (Gehenna)	12	Hell	Hell	Hell	Hell	Hell	Hell	Hell
ταρταρῶ (Tartarō̂, verb)	1	Hell	Hell	Hell	Hell	Hell	Hell	Hell

The most common New Testament term translated as "Hell" is γέεννα (gehenna), a direct loan of Hebrew גהנום/גהנם (ge-hinnom). Apart from one use in James 3:6, this term is found exclusively in the synoptic gospels. Gehenna is most frequently described as a place of punishment (e.g., Matthew 5:22, Matthew 18:8–9; Mark 9:43–49).

The New Testament also uses the Greek word hades, usually to refer to the abode of the dead (e.g., Acts 2:31; Revelation 20:13). Only one passage describes hades as a place of torment, the parable of Lazarus and Dives (Luke 16:19–31). Jesus here depicts a wicked man suffering fiery torment in hades, which is contrasted with the bosom of Abraham, and explains that it is impossible to cross over from one to the other. Some scholars believe that this parable reflects the intertestamental Jewish view of hades (or sheol) as containing separate divisions for the wicked and righteous.

=== Parables of Jesus concerning the hereafter ===
In the eschatological discourse of Matthew 25:31–46, Jesus says that, when the Son of Man comes in his glory, he will separate people from one another as a shepherd separates sheep from goats, and will consign to everlasting fire those who failed to aid "the least of his brothers". This separation is stark, with no explicit provision made for fine gradations of merit or guilt:

Depart from me, you who are cursed, into the eternal fire prepared for the devil and his angels. For I was hungry and you gave me nothing to eat, I was thirsty and you gave me nothing to drink, I was a stranger and you did not invite me in, I needed clothes and you did not clothe me, I was sick and in prison and you did not look after me. ...whatever you did not do for one of the least of these, you did not do for me.

— Matthew 25:41–43 (NIV)

=== Similar concepts ===
==== Lake of Fire ====
The Book of Revelation mentions a lake of fire and brimstone in which unrighteous people are thrown.

==== Abyss ====
According to the Book of Revelation, the abyss is the place in which the Seven-Headed Dragon is imprisoned during the Millennium.

== Eastern Orthodox views ==
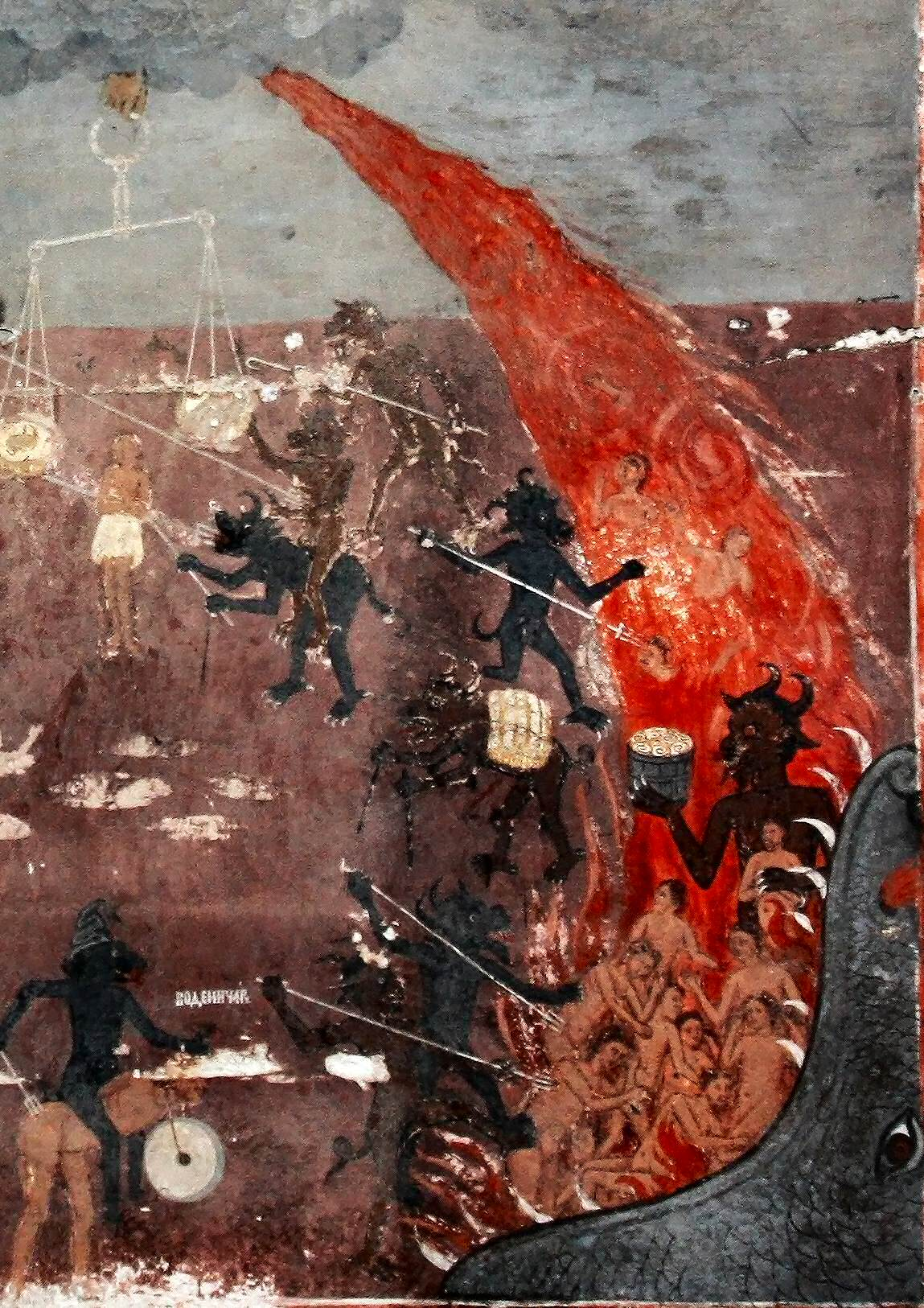
Hell – detail from a fresco in the medieval church of St Nicholas in Raduil, Bulgaria

Some Eastern Orthodox Christians believe that Heaven and Hell are relations to or experiences of God's just and loving presence. There is no created place of divine absence, nor is hell an ontological separation from God. One expression of the Eastern teaching is that hell and heaven are dimensions of God's intensifying presence, as this presence is experienced either as torment or as paradise depending on the spiritual state of a person dwelling with God. For one who hates God and by extension hates himself as God's image-bearer, to be encompassed by the divine presence could only result in unspeakable anguish. Aristotle Papanikolaou and Elizabeth H. Prodromou write in their book Thinking Through Faith: New Perspectives from Orthodox Christian Scholars that for the Eastern Orthodox: "Those theological symbols, heaven and hell, are not crudely understood as spatial destinations but rather refer to the experience of God's presence according to two different modes."

Several Eastern Orthodox theologians do describe hell as separation from God, in the sense of being out of fellowship or loving communion. Archimandrite Sophrony (Sakharov) spoke of "the hell of separation from God". Paul Evdokimov stated: "Hell is nothing else but separation of man from God, his autonomy excluding him from the place where God is present." According to Theodore Stylianopoulos, "Hell is a spiritual state of separation from God and inability to experience the love of God, while being conscious of the ultimate deprivation of it as punishment." Michel Quenot stated: "Hell is none other than the state of separation from God, a condition into which humanity was plunged for having preferred the creature to the Creator. It is the human creature, therefore, and not God, who engenders hell. Created free for the sake of love, man possesses the incredible power to reject this love, to say 'no' to God. By refusing communion with God, he becomes a predator, condemning himself to a spiritual death (hell) more dreadful than the physical death that derives from it." Another writer declared: "The circumstances that rise before us, the problems we encounter, the relationships we form, the choices we make, all ultimately concern our eternal union with or separation from God."

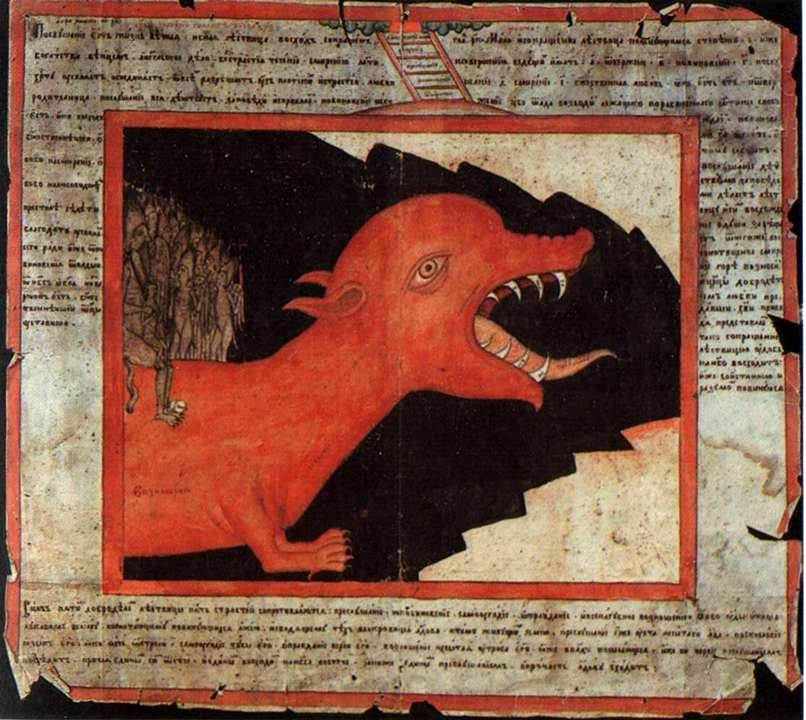
"A Monster from Hell". A 19th-century Russian hand-drawn lubok.

The Eastern Orthodox Church rejects what is presented as the Roman Catholic doctrine of purgatory as a place where believers suffer as their "venial sins" are purged before gaining admittance to heaven.

=== Images ===
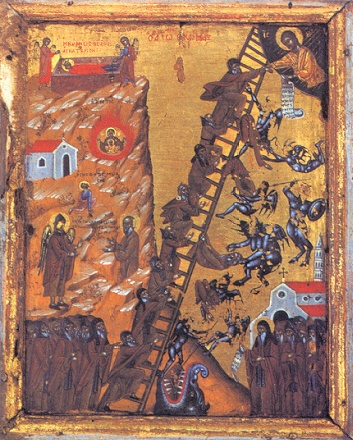
Icon in Saint Catherine's Monastery, Sinai, showing monks falling from the Ladder to Heaven into the mouth of a dragon, representing Hell

John Chrysostom pictured Hell as associated with "unquenchable" fire and "various kinds of torments and torrents of punishment".

Icons based on The Ladder of Divine Ascent, by John Climacus, show monks ascending a thirty-rung ladder to Heaven represented by Christ, or succumbing to the arrows of demons and falling from the ladder into Hell, sometimes represented by an open-jawed dragon.

== Roman Catholicism ==
=== As eternal torment ===
The Council of Trent taught, in the 5th canon of its 14th session, that damnation is eternal: "...the loss of eternal blessedness, and the eternal damnation which he has incurred..." This teaching is based on Jesus' parable of the sheep and the goats: "Depart from me, you accursed, into the eternal fire...And these will go off to eternal punishment,..."

=== As self-exclusion or final impenitence ===
The Catechism of the Catholic Church defines hell as self-exclusion from Heaven, a freely chosen consequence of final impenitence, i.e., deliberately and willingly refusing to repent of mortal sin at death and accept divine mercy:

To die in mortal sin without repenting and accepting God's merciful love means remaining separated from him for ever by our own free choice. This state of definitive self-exclusion from communion with God and the blessed is called "hell."

[Perfect] contrition remits venial sins; it also obtains forgiveness of mortal sins if it includes the firm resolution to have recourse to sacramental confession as soon as possible.

The prisoners of hell are the impenitent, such as Satan; Satan's fall from Heaven is irrevocable because he chooses not to repent. No one is predestined to commit sin or to go to hell. Catholic doctrine holds that after death, repentance is impossible.

=== As a place or a state ===
==== State ====
The Baltimore Catechism defined Hell by using the word "state" alone: "Hell is a state to which the wicked are condemned, and in which they are deprived of the sight of God for all eternity, and are in dreadful torments." However, suffering is characterized as both mental and physical: "The damned will suffer in both mind and body, because both mind and body had a share in their sins."

Pope John Paul II stated on 28 July 1999, that, in speaking of Hell as a place, the Bible uses "a symbolic language", which "must be correctly interpreted […]. Rather than a place, hell indicates the state of those who freely and definitively separate themselves from God, the source of all life and joy." Some have interpreted these words as a denial that Hell can be considered to be a place, or at least as providing an alternative picture of Hell. Others have explicitly disagreed with the interpretation of what the Pope said as an actual denial that Hell can be considered a place and have said that the Pope was only directing attention away from what is secondary to the real essence of hell.

Catholic theologian Hans Urs von Balthasar (1905–1988) said that "we must see that hell is not an object that is 'full' or 'empty' of human individuals, but a possibility that is not 'created' by God but in any case by the free individuals who choose it".

The Catholic Faith Handbook for Youth, with imprimatur of 2007, also says that "more accurately" heaven and hell are not places but states.

Capuchin theologian Berard A. Marthaler also says that "hell is not 'a place'".

==== Place ====
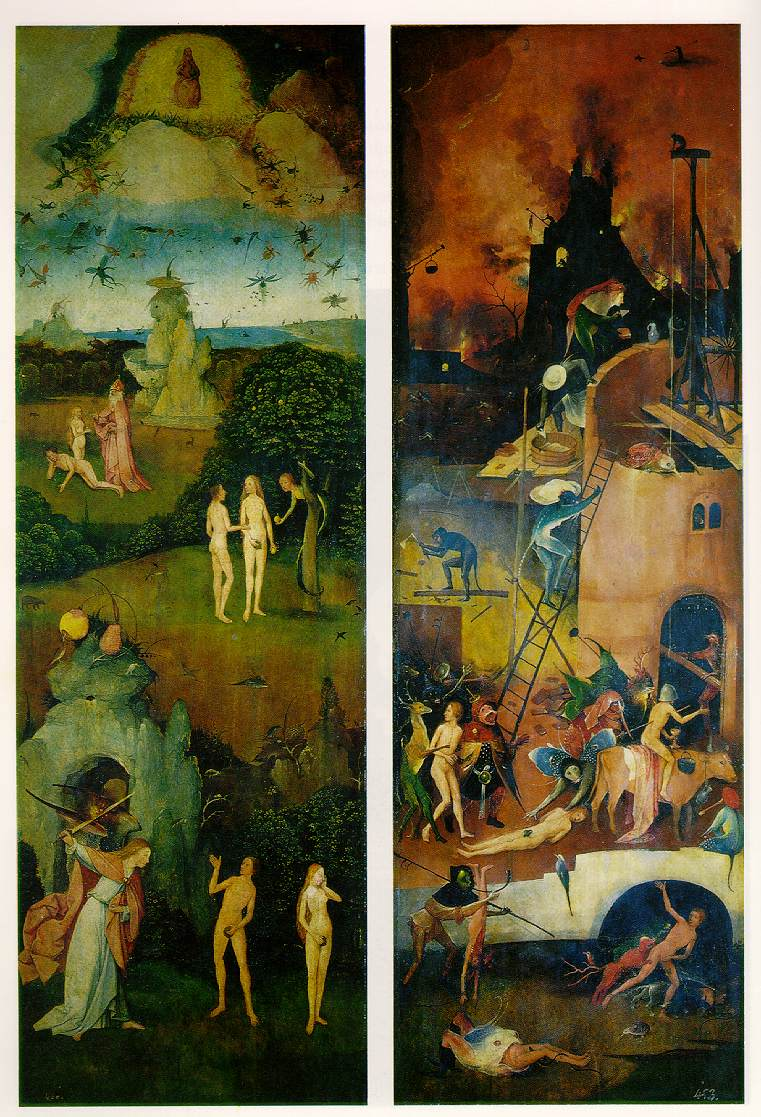
Hell (on the right) is portrayed in Paradise and Hell, a 16th-century Hieronymus Bosch (or Bosch workshop) painting.

Traditionally in the past Hell has been considered as a place. Some have rejected metaphorical interpretations of the biblical descriptions of hell, and have attributed to Hell a location within the earth, while others who uphold the belief that hell is a place say that its location is unknown.

In a homily given on 25 March 2007, Pope Benedict XVI stated: "Jesus came to tell us that he wants us all in heaven and that hell, of which so little is said in our time, exists and is eternal for those who close their hearts to his love." Journalist Richard Owen's interpretation of this remark as declaring that hell is an actual place was reported in multiple media outlets.

Writing in the 1910 Catholic Encyclopedia, Joseph Hontheim said that "theologians generally accept the opinion that hell is really within the earth. The Catholic Church has decided nothing on this subject; hence we may say hell is a definite place; but where it is, we do not know." He cited the view of Augustine of Hippo that Hell is under the earth and that of Gregory the Great that hell is either on the earth or under it.

The posthumous supplement to Aquinas' Summa theologiciae suppl. Q97 A4 flags discussion of the location of hell as speculation: As Augustine says (De Civ. Dei xv, 16), "I am of opinion that no one knows in what part of the world hell is situated, unless the Spirit of God has revealed this to some one."

==== Both ====
Other Catholics neither affirm nor deny that Hell is a place, and speak of it as "a place or state". Ludwig Ott's work "The Fundamentals of Catholic Dogma" said: "Hell is a place or state of eternal punishment inhabited by those rejected by God". Robert J. Fox wrote: "Hell is a place or state of eternal punishment inhabited by those rejected by God because such souls have rejected God's saving grace." Evangelicals Norman L. Geisler and Ralph E. MacKenzie interpret official Roman Catholic teaching as: "Hell is a place or state of eternal punishment inhabited by those rejected by God."

=== Nature of suffering ===
Hell is often depicted as a place of suffering.

The Catechism of the Catholic Church states:

Jesus often speaks of "Gehenna" of "the unquenchable fire" reserved for those who to the end of their lives refuse to believe and be converted, where both soul and body can be lost. Jesus solemnly proclaims that he "will send his angels, and they will gather. . . all evil doers, and throw them into the furnace of fire", and that he will pronounce the condemnation: "Depart from me, you cursed, into the eternal fire!" The teaching of the Church affirms the existence of hell and its eternity. Immediately after death the souls of those who die in a state of mortal sin descend into hell, where they suffer the punishments of hell, "eternal fire". The chief punishment of hell is eternal separation from God, in whom alone man can possess the life and happiness for which he was created and for which he longs.

Although the Catechism explicitly speaks of the punishments of hell in the plural and speaks of eternal separation from God as the "chief" of those punishments, one commentator claims that it is non-committal on the existence of forms of punishment other than that of separation of God: after all, God, being above all a merciful and loving entity, takes no pleasure in the death of the living, and does not will or predestine anyone to go there (the Catholic stance is that God does not will suffering, and that the only entities known to be in hell beyond a doubt are Satan and his evil angels, and that the only suffering in hell is not fire nor torture, but the freely-chosen, irrevocable and inescapable eternal separation from God and his freely given love, and the righteous, who are in heaven; thus the church and the popes have placed emphasis on the potential irreversibility of a mortally sinful life that goes un-absolved before one's death, and the dogma and reality of the place or state of hell). Another interpretation is that the Catechism by no means denies other forms of suffering, but stresses that the pain of loss is central to the Catholic understanding of hell.

Augustine of Hippo said that the suffering of hell is compounded because God continues to love the sinner who is not able to return the love. According to the church, whatever is the nature of the sufferings, "they are not imposed by a vindictive judge".

"Concerning the detailed specific nature of hell ... the Catholic Church has defined nothing. ... It is useless to speculate about its true nature, and more sensible to confess our ignorance in a question that evidently exceeds human understanding."

In his book, Inventing Hell, Catholic writer and historian Jon M. Sweeney is critical of the ways that Christians have appropriated Dante's vision and images of hell. In its review, Publishers Weekly called the book "persuasively argued."

=== Visions ===
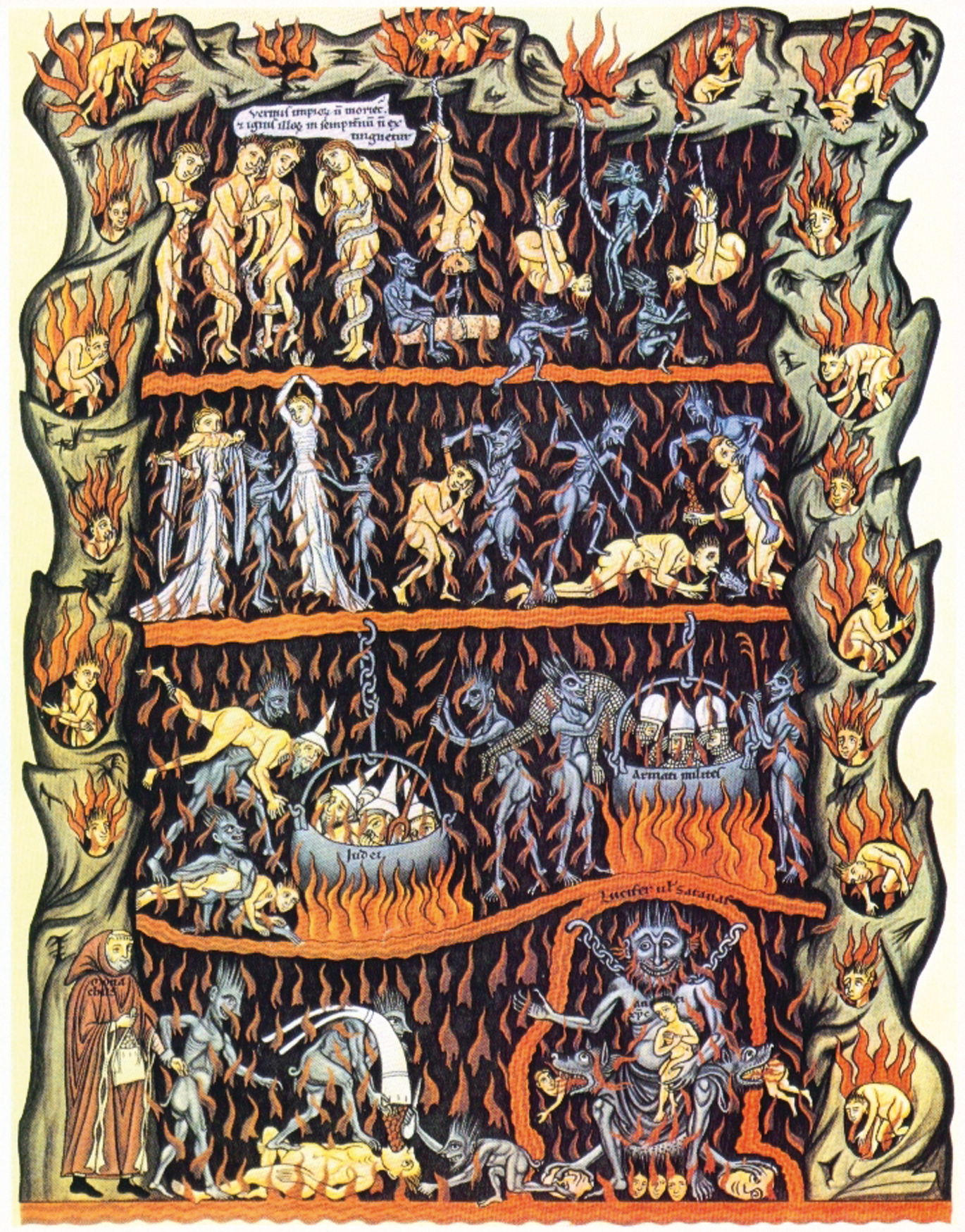
Medieval image of hell in the Hortus deliciarum of Herrad of Landsberg (c. 1180)

A number of Catholic mystics and saints have claimed to have received visions of Hell. During various Marian apparitions, such as those at Fatima or at Kibeho, the visionaries claimed that the Virgin Mary during the course of the visions showed them a view of Hell where sinners were suffering.

At Fátima in Portugal, it is claimed that she told Jacinta Marto; that more sinners go to Hell because of sins of impurity than any other.

Columba of Iona is alleged to have on several occasions even been able to name particular individuals who he said were going to end life in Hell for their sins and accurately predicted the way they would die.

A story recorded by Cluniac monks in the Middle Ages claimed that Benedict of Nursia appeared to a monk on one occasion and told the monk that there had just been (at that point in time) a monk who had fled the monastic life to go back into the world, and the ex-monk then died and he went to hell.

=== Call to responsibility ===
The Catholic Church teaches that no one is predestined to Hell, and that the church's teaching on Hell is not meant to frighten but is a call for people to use their freedom wisely. It is first and foremost a call to conversion, and to show that Humanity's true destiny lies with God in heaven.

=== Predestination ===
The Catholic Church, and the Catechism, repudiates the view commonly known as "double predestination" which claims that God not only chooses who will be saved, but that he also creates some people who will be doomed to damnation. This view is often associated with the Protestant reformer John Calvin.

== Protestantism ==
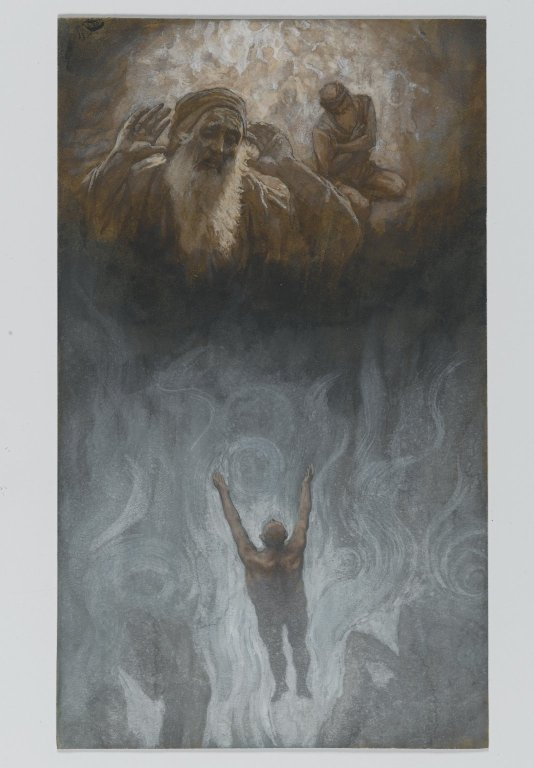
The parable of the Rich man and Lazarus depicting the rich man in hell asking for help to Abraham and Lazarus in heaven by James Tissot

In historic Protestant traditions, hell is the place created by God for the punishment of the devil and fallen angels (cf. Matthew 25:41), and those whose names are not written in the book of life (cf. Revelation 20:15). It is the final destiny of every person who does not receive salvation, where they will be punished for their sins. People will be consigned to hell after the last judgment.

The nuances in the views of "hell" held by different Protestant denominations, both in relation to Hades (i.e., the abode of the dead) and Gehenna (i.e., the destination of the wicked), are largely a function of the varying Protestant views on the intermediate state between death and resurrection; and different views on the immortality of the soul or the alternative, the conditional immortality. For example, John Calvin, who believed in conscious existence after death, had a different concept of hell (Hades and Gehenna) to Martin Luther who held that death was sleep.

=== Eternal torment view ===
The Westminster Confession (1646), a Reformed confession of faith, states "the wicked, who know not God, and obey not the gospel of Jesus Christ, shall be cast into eternal torments, and punished with everlasting destruction from the presence of the Lord, and from the glory of his power." (Chapter XXXIII, Of the Last Judgment)

The Book of Discipline of the Evangelical Methodist Church Conference similarly teaches that "the impenitent sinner is turned away into everlasting condemnation, punishment and misery."

This is known as the eternal conscious torment (ECT) view. This view is the traditional position of Anabaptist (Mennonite, Hutterite, Bruderhof, Amish, Schwarzenau Brethren, River Brethren and Apostolic Christian churches), Anglican, Baptist, Charismatics, Lutheran, Methodist, Moravian, Pentecostals, Plymouth Brethren, Reformed (Congregationalist, Continental Reformed and Presbyterian churches), and Conservative Quaker denominations.

Some writers such as Anglican layman C. S. Lewis and J.P. Moreland have cast hell in terms of "eternal separation" from God. Certain biblical texts have led some theologians to the conclusion that punishment in hell, though eternal and irrevocable, will be proportional to the deeds of each soul (e.g., Matthew 10:15, Luke 12:46–48).

Another area of debate is the fate of the unevangelized (i.e., those who have never had an opportunity to hear the Christian gospel).

=== View of conditional immortality and annihilationism ===
Some Protestants believe in conditional immortality, one version of which teaches that those sent to hell will not experience eternal conscious punishment, but instead will have their consciousness extinguished or annihilated after a period of "limited conscious punishment".

Prominent evangelical theologians who have adopted conditionalist beliefs include John Wenham, Edward Fudge, Clark Pinnock, and Greg Boyd.

The Seventh-day Adventist Church holds annihilationism, and they do not believe there is any conscious punishment after death for anyone. Seventh-day Adventists believe that death is a state of unconscious sleep until the resurrection. They base this belief on biblical texts such as Ecclesiastes 9:5 which states "the dead know nothing", and 1 Thessalonians 4:13 which contains a description of the sleeping dead being raised from the grave at the second coming. These verses, Adventists say, indicate that death is only a period or form of slumber.

Christadelphians also teach the annihilationist viewpoint, and they do not believe in any conscious punishment after death for anyone either.

== Other groups ==
=== Christian Science ===
Christian Science defines "hell" as follows: "Mortal belief; error; lust; remorse; hatred; revenge; sin; sickness; death; suffering and self-destruction; self-imposed agony; effects of sin; that which 'worketh abomination or maketh a lie.' " (Science and Health with Key to the Scriptures)

=== Christian Universalism ===
Some today holding mostly Protestant views (such as George MacDonald, Karl Barth, William Barclay, Keith DeRose, Robin Parry, and Thomas Talbott) believe that after serving their sentence in Gehenna, all souls are reconciled to God and admitted to heaven, or ways are found at the time of death of drawing all souls to repentance so that no "hellish" suffering is experienced. This view is often called Christian universalism—its conservative branch is more specifically called 'Biblical or Trinitarian universalism'— related to, but different from Unitarian Universalism. See universal reconciliation, apocatastasis and the Problem of Hell. Though a theological minority in contemporary Western Christianity, a number of global Christians held this view throughout history (such as Clement of Alexandria, Origen, Gregory of Nyssa, etc.) and some Orthodox theologians argue that it was once the theological majority view.

Christian Universalism teaches that an eternal Hell does not exist and is a later creation of the church with no biblical support. Reasoning by Christian Universalists includes that an eternal Hell is against the nature, character and attributes of a loving God, human nature, sin's nature of destruction rather than perpetual misery, the nature of holiness and happiness and the nature and object of punishment.

Thomas Talbott, a prominent Trinitarian Universalist, illustrates this viewpoint by delineating three propositions which are biblically based, but which he asserts to be mutually exclusive:

1. God is omnipotent and exercises sovereign control over all aspects of human life and history.
2. God is omni-benevolent, is ontologically Love, and desires the salvation of all people.
3. Some (many) persons will experience everlasting, conscious torment in a place of (either literal or metaphorical) fire.

Traditional theology seeks to resolve the apparent contradiction by refining concepts such as omnipotence and omnibenevolence. Calvinism addresses this tension through the doctrine of limited atonement, which holds that God’s saving love is restricted to the elect. Only a select group is chosen for salvation, which includes redemption and purification. This reflects a special form of love, while the majority (the non-elect or “eternally reprobate”) are given only common grace and divine forbearance. This bifurcation of grace aims to preserve both a doctrine of God's omnibenevolence and a doctrine of hell. By contrast, Arminianism resolves the tension by proposing that God voluntarily limits his providence with respect to human freedom. This is commonly referred to as synergism. It maintains that human beings possess libertarian free will, allowing them to choose whether to accept or reject God’s grace. Universalists reject this final limitation and argue instead that salvation is ultimately granted to all people.

=== Gnosticism ===
Multiple gnostic Christians, such as the Cathars, interpreted hell as a metaphor for this flawed, material world in which human souls have become entrapped. Later writers influenced by the gnostic worldview, such as Milton and Blake, interpreted it differently. In The Marriage of Heaven and Hell, William Blake is read by certain scholars as implying that hell is similar to heaven, or even preferable to it in terms of being a state in which creative impulses are allowed free rein outside the domination of society, which prefers the limitations of heaven.

=== Jehovah's Witnesses ===
Jehovah's Witnesses do not believe in an immortal soul that survives after physical death. They believe the Bible presents "hell", as translated from "Sheol" and "Hades", to be the common grave for both the good and the bad. They reject the idea of a place of literal eternal pain or torment as being inconsistent with God's love and justice. They define "Gehenna" as eternal destruction or the "second death", which is reserved for those with no opportunity of a resurrection such as those who will be destroyed at Armageddon. Jehovah's Witnesses believe that others who have died before Armageddon will be resurrected bodily on earth and then judged during the 1,000-year rule of Christ; the judgement will be based on their obedience to God's laws after their resurrection.

The Christadelphian view is broadly similar to the Jehovah's Witness view, except for the fact that it teaches the belief that the resurrected will be judged for how they lived their lives before the resurrection.

=== Latter Day Saints ===
The Church of Jesus Christ of Latter-day Saints (LDS Church) teaches that the word "hell" is used scripturally in at least two senses. The first is a place commonly called Spirit Prison which is a state of punishment for those who reject Christ and his Atonement. This is understood to be a temporary state in which the spirits of deceased persons will be taught the gospel and have an opportunity to repent and accept ordinances of salvation. Latter-day Saints teach that it was for this purpose that Christ visited the Spirit World after his crucifixion (1 Peter 3:19–20, 1 Peter 4:5–6). Modern-day revelation clarifies that while there, Christ began the work of salvation for the dead by commissioning spirits of the righteous to teach the gospel to those who didn't have the opportunity to receive it while on earth.

Latter-day Saints also believe that righteous people will rise in a "first resurrection" and live with Christ on earth after his return. After the 1000 years known as the Millennium, the individuals in spirit prison who chose not to accept the gospel and repent will also be resurrected (1 Corinthians 15:20-22) and receive an immortal physical body, which is referred to as the "second resurrection". At these appointed times of resurrection, "death and hell" will deliver up the dead that are in them to be judged according to their works (Revelations 20:13), at which point all but the sons of perdition will receive a degree of glory, which Paul compared to the glory of the sun, moon, and stars (1 Corinthians 15:41). The Church explains biblical descriptions of hell being "eternal" or "endless" punishment as being descriptive of their infliction by God rather than an unending temporal period. Latter-day Saint scripture quotes God as saying "I am endless, and the punishment which is given from my hand is endless punishment, for Endless is my name. Wherefore—Eternal punishment is God's punishment. Endless punishment is God's punishment." Latter-day Saints also believe in a more permanent concept of hell, commonly referred to as outer darkness. It is said that few people who have lived on the earth will be consigned to this hell, but Latter-day Saint scripture suggests that at least Cain will be present. Other mortals who during their lifetime become sons of perdition, those who commit the unpardonable sin or sin "against the Holy Ghost", will be consigned to outer darkness. Near the end of his life, in a discourse called the King Follett Sermon, Joseph Smith taught that, "After a man has sinned against the Holy Ghost, there is no repentance for him. He has got to say that the sun does not shine while he sees it; he has got to deny Jesus Christ when the heavens have been opened unto him, and to deny the plan of salvation with his eyes open to the truth of it; and from that time he begins to be an enemy." In other words, the unpardonable sin is committed by those who "den[y] the Son after the Father has revealed him". However, according to the Latter-day Saint understanding, since most humans lack such an extent of religious enlightenment, they cannot commit the Eternal sin, and the vast majority of residents of outer darkness will be the "devil and his angels...the third part of the hosts of heaven" who in the premortal existence followed Lucifer and never received a mortal body. The residents of outer darkness are the only children of God that will not receive one of three kingdoms of glory at the Last Judgment.

It is unclear whether those in outer darkness will ultimately be redeemed. Of outer darkness and the sons of perdition, Latter-day Saint scripture states that "the end thereof, neither the place thereof, nor their torment, no man knows; Neither was it revealed, neither is, neither will be revealed unto man, except to them who are made partakers thereof". The scripture asserts that those who are consigned to this state will be aware of its duration and limitations.

=== Seventh-day Adventist Church ===
The Seventh-day Adventist Church believes that the concept of eternal suffering is incompatible with God's character and that he cannot torture His children. They instead believe that Hell is a state of eternal death and that death is a state of unconscious sleep until the resurrection. They base this belief on biblical texts such as Ecclesiastes 9:5 which states "the dead know nothing", and 1 Thessalonians 4:13 which contains a description of the dead being raised from the grave at the second coming. These verses, it is argued, indicate that death is only a period or form of slumber. Based on verses like Matthew 16:27 and Romans 6:23 they believe the unsaved do not go to any place of punishment as soon as they die, but are reserved in the grave until the day of judgment after the Second coming of Jesus to be judged, either for eternal life or eternal death. This interpretation is called annihilationism.

=== Swedenborgianism ===
See Swedenborgianism § Hell

=== Unity Church ===
The Unity Church of Charles Fillmore considers the concept of everlasting physical Hell to be false doctrine and contradictory to that reported by John the Evangelist.

== Biblical terminology ==
Sheol
In the King James Bible, the Old Testament term Sheol is translated as "Hell" 31 times, and it is translated as "the grave" 31 times. Sheol is also translated as "the pit" three times.
Modern Bible translations typically render Sheol as "the grave", "the pit", or "death".

Abaddon
The Hebrew word abaddon, meaning "destruction", is sometimes interpreted as being a synonym for "Hell".

Gehenna
In the New Testament, both early (i.e., the KJV) and modern translations often translate Gehenna as "Hell". Young's Literal Translation and the New World Translation are two notable exceptions, both of which simply use the word "Gehenna".

Hades
Hades is the Greek word which is traditionally used in place of the Hebrew word Sheol in works such as the Septuagint, the Greek translation of the Hebrew Bible. Like other first-century Jews who were literate in Greek, Christian writers of the New Testament employed this usage. While earlier translations most often translated Hades as "Hell", as does the King James Version, modern translations use the transliteration "Hades", or render the word as allusions "to the grave", "among the dead", "place of the dead" or they contain similar statements. In Latin, Hades were translated as Purgatorium (Purgatory) after about 1200 AD, but no modern English translations render Hades as Purgatory.

Tartarus
Only appears in 2 Peter 2:4 in the New Testament; both early and modern Bible translations usually translate Tartarus as "Hell", though a few render it as "Tartarus".

== See also ==
- Hell in Catholicism
