= Love of God in Christianity =

Concept in Christianity

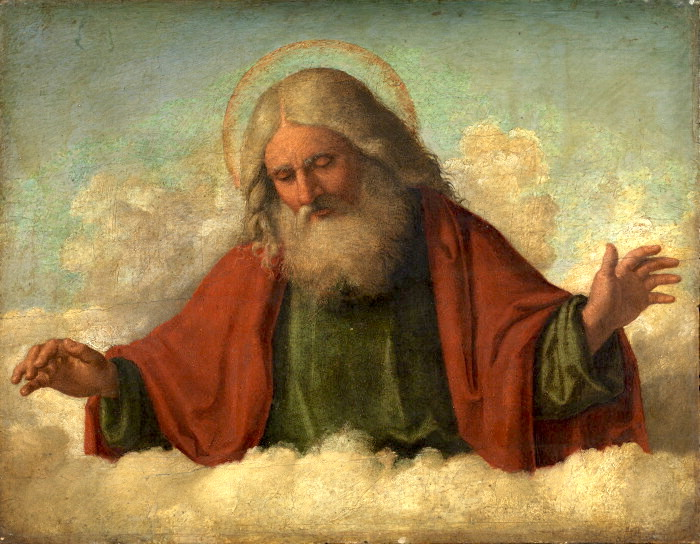
God the Father by Cima da Conegliano, c. 1515

The love of God is a prevalent concept both in the Old Testament and the New Testament. Love is a key attribute of God in Christianity. In the New Testament, the expression "God is love" explicitly occurs twice: 1 John 4:8,16.

The love of God has been the center of the spirituality of a number of Christian mystics such as Teresa of Avila.

== Old Testament ==
The Old Testament uses a rich vocabulary to express the love of God, as a concept that appears in many instances. For example, the prophet Isaiah states, "For thy Maker is thine husband; the Lord of hosts is his name; and thy Redeemer the Holy One of Israel" (Isaiah 54:5), using the analogy of a husband-wife relationship to describe the intimate love between God and Israel (or the love between God and the individual created by him). Likewise, the prophet Hosea saw God's love as the basis for the election of Israel (cf. Hosea 11:1) and describes Israel's idolatry (worshipping other gods) as spiritual adultery (Hosea 3:1). In Isaiah 38, God expresses his love for individuals as well. Many Christians see the relationship between Solomon and the Shulamite woman from the Song of Songs as symbolizing Christ's relation to his church. The love of God appears in a number of texts (e.g. Hosea 1–3, and then in Ezek 16 and Isa 62, etc.); however, modern scholars claim that the exegesis of the love of God in the Old Testament presents problems for them in resolving the references to produce a consistent interpretation, which has been subject to debate.

== New Testament ==
Both the terms love of God and love of Christ appear in the New Testament. In cases such as in Romans 8:35 and Romans 8:39 their use is related in the experience of the believer, without asserting their equality. In John 14:31 Jesus expresses his love for God the Father. This verse includes the only direct statement by Jesus in the New Testament about Jesus' love for the God the Father. The love of the Father for his Son (Jesus Christ) is expressed in Matthew 3:17 by a voice from Heaven during the Baptism of Jesus. The same sentiment is later expressed during the Transfiguration of Jesus in Mark 9:7, where a voice from Heaven tells the three disciples: "This is my Son, whom I love. Listen to him!"

Love is a key attribute of God in Christianity. 1 John 4:8 and 16 state that "God is love; and he who abides in love abides in God, and God abides in him." John 3:16 states: "God so loved the world..."

In the New Testament, God's love for humanity or the world is expressed in Greek as agape (ἀγάπη). The same Greek word agape is used also of the love of Christians for one another and for other human beings, as in 1 Thessalonians 3:12: "May the Lord make your love increase and overflow for each other and for everyone else." The corresponding verb agapō (ἀγαπῶ) is used not only of God's love and of the mutual love of Christians, but also of Christians' love for God, as in 1 John 4:21: "And he has given us this command: Whoever loves God must also love his brother."

== Christian mysticism ==
The experience of God's love is a central part of most traditions of Christian mysticism. This experience of God's love plays a central role in the Spiritual Exercises, which are the foundation of Ignatian spirituality. God's love also plays an important part in the writings of Medieval German mystics, such as Mechthild of Magdeburg and Hildegard von Bingen, who describe divine love as a burning passion. Julian of Norwich expresses the same sentiment in her Sixteen Revelations of Divine Love (c. 1393).

Thomas Aquinas taught that the essence of sanctity lies in the love of God, and Thérèse of Lisieux made the love of God the center of her spirituality.

In scholastic philosophy, God is love, and Trinitarian love, according to Bonaventure of Bagnoregio, is mutual, selfless, and radically removed from all selfishness—a static state. Love is essentially ecstatic, for it excludes all selfish desires and even involves renouncing the self to lose oneself in the beloved. This interpretation was represented by Bernard of Clairvaux, Abelard, and Richard of Saint Victor, and found its symbol in the seraphic figure of Francis of Assisi. The Father's love is said to be freely given, since God is agape love, understood as pure relationship, He tends to give His love in charity, and what gives God his essence is His love. It is also said that human love is not the love of God and cannot be the same. And, in turn, human love for oneself is different from love for others when it springs from self-love.

== See also ==
- Christian universalism
- Divine mercy
- Mercy
- Omnibenevolence
- Problem of Hell
- Trinity § Trinity and love
