= Christian universalism =

Christian belief that all will be reconciled to God

Christian universalism is a school of Christian theology focused around the doctrine of universal reconciliation – the view that all human beings will ultimately be saved and restored to a right relationship with God.

It is related to, but distinct from, general universalism, which in theological terms considers that there are universal truths contained in the teachings of religion, and is often contrasted with relativism. Under most frameworks of Christian universal reconciliation, the eventual salvation of all people follows from universal claims about God’s nature, and the ultimate purpose of divine judgment.

The term Christian universalism was used in the Christian Intelligencer in the 1820s by Russell Streeter—a descendant of Adams Streeter who had founded one of the first Universalist Churches on September 14, 1785. Some Christian universalists like John Wesley Hanson claim that in Early Christianity (prior to the 6th century), this was the most common interpretation of Christianity.

As a formal Christian denomination, Christian universalism originated in the late 18th century with the Universalist Church of America. Their membership was consolidated with the American Unitarian Association into the Unitarian Universalist Association on May 15, 1961. There is no single denomination uniting Christian universalists, but a few denominations teach some of the principles of Christian universalism or are open to them.

== Definitions ==
=== Within Soteriology ===
Christian universalism has been defined as the belief that "all will be saved", such as by Avery Robert Dulles and Justo L. González. Sometimes "all" in this definition can be specified as "all men", "all created beings", or "all souls", like with Ken Jennings' definition. Everybody can be used instead, such as with Russell D. Moore's definition, as can "everyone", "every single person", "all persons", or "all people". This can be expanded to all moral or rational beings. Other times it has been limited to "all humans", or "all human beings", like with John Frame's definition. Other specifiers have included "all mankind", "all of God's children", "all good people", or "all sinners". Some include fallen angels, like Christian universalist historian John Wesley Hanson. This may depend on if angels are seen as intelligent and volitional beings. Some definitions even include Satan's salvation, such as with Randall Sullivan's definition. However, some definitions exclude the Devil and his demons. There also exists disagreements on whether non-human animals are included. It can be defined in the context of reaching heaven, or going there, like with Forrest Church's definition. This heaven was defined as "Spirit Land" by Andrew Jackson Davis.

Redemption may also be included in the definition, such as with Robin Parry's and David Bentley Hart's claims, or reconciliation, or grace. Parry emphasizes a bringing about of God's purpose and creation's destiny. Universal salvation, universal reconciliation, universal restoration, the blessed hope and irresistible grace have also been used as synonymous terms. However, reconciliation and salvation may be viewed as different concepts entirely, as posited by John Murray in the 18th century, who believed everyone already to be saved, yet still awaiting reconciliation after death. Meanwhile "universalist" has been defined as "believing that all will be saved", a "believer in Universalism", or as an "adherent to Universalism". The terms "member of an organized body of Christians" "member of a Christian denomination" exist among these definitions.

It can also be defined as an openness to salvation for all without definitive affirmation or knowledge in advance. Christian universalism has also been defined as a Christian sect, or a religious denomination, such as by Thomas Baldwin Thayer. Merriam-Webster specifies this as an 18th-century liberal Christian denomination, one which later merged with Unitarianism. Triumph has been used in the definition, such as of God's will to save all people, or the triumph of good over evil. Lee Strobel defined Christian universalism as universal forgiveness and adoption through Christ. Another definition emphasizes attainment of perfect blessedness. It has also been defined as that which "overturned Calvinist doctrines of predestination". However, its definition has also included predestination for salvation.

Among definitions of Christian Universalism are those that assert that explicit faith in Jesus Christ is required for salvation and those who hold no such requirement. It has been argued that the claim that Christian universalism is defined as "all roads lead to God" is a straw man. Robin Parry argues that this is "a very recent sort of mangled up liberal version of universalism" that has not existed historically. However, it has been claimed that such pluralism can be included within Christian universalism's definition. Yet James Montgomery Boice rejects this, claiming that all people will be saved through Jesus Christ.

There is debate on whether "hopeful universalism", defined as "the hope that all would be saved" or "the desire that all would be saved" counts as Christian universalism or not. For example, the United Methodist Church rejects Christian universalism being defined as "the possibility that all may be saved". Karl Barth's idea of universal election, where everyone is not saved but only chosen for salvation, has sometimes been seen as hopeful universalism. It has been argued that belief in hopeful universalism makes one a soft universalist, like Hans Urs von Balthasar, and is taught by the magisterium, as opposed to a dogmatic or hard universalist. However, the use of such labels has not been met with universal support.

Christian universalism has been argued to mean that everyone will make the same choice, and has been differentiated from Christian inclusivism, which has been claimed to be more focused on expanding the realm of choice, such as allowing the possibility of salvation without hearing the name of Christ.

Christian universalism has also been defined as an event that has already taken place, like with Billy Graham's definition. The rejection of eternal torment, eternal damnation, or eternal punishment has been included in its definition before. It has been also claimed that there are Christian universalists who believe in annihilationism.

Other theologians reject the universal salvation definition of Christian universalism and instead favor defining it as a universal call to evangelism, such as with John Robert Walmsley Stott's definition. Christian universalism has been defined as a universal opportunity for all to explicitly hear the gospel, either pre-mortem or post-mortem, such as with N. T. Wright's definition. There are disagreements whether it is merely a universal offer, or also universally effective.

=== Outside Soteriology ===
Christian universalism without a soteriological meaning ranges from a protection of universal rights, to genuine toleration, to a kind of monotheistic imperialism. Bible scholars Amy-Jill Levine and Marc Zvi Brettler used the term Christian universalism in a sentence where they describe what they view as Martin Luther's antipathy towards Judaism. The authors see such views like Luther's as anti-Jewish and ignoring the universalistic message of the book of Jonah. The view of the authors is that Jonah is an antihero who is an example of what should not be done. The authors do not believe that Jesus invented universalism, but instead that "Jonah is in the same universalistic tradition as the first chapter of Genesis, which proclaims that all people are created in the divine image." They argue against the claim that Judaism is xenophobic as they believe universalism existed in the Tanakh in the sense of viewing the judgment being passed by the God of Israel who is the God of the world, and on the basis of ethics rather than ethnicity. Christian universalism, when defined as relating to the idea of the God of Israel being seen as all of creation's one Lord, has been argued to be foundational for the development of Christianity. Paul Johnson describes a universalism of Jesus where all of humanity is loved and where he is everyone's neighbor.

John Barton argues that there is a tension within Christianity between universalism and particularism, as characterized by how God is both the universal creator of all people, yet also chose Israel, a particular people.

== Beliefs ==
In his Plain Guide to Universalism, Christian ultra-universalist Thomas Whittemore writes, "The sentiment by which Universalists are distinguished, is this that: at last every individual of the human race shall become holy and happy. This does not comprise the whole of their faith, but, merely that feature of it which is peculiar to them and by which they are distinguished from the rest of the world."

The remaining central beliefs of Christian universalism are compatible with Christianity in general:

- God is the loving parent of all people (see Love of God).
- Jesus Christ reveals the nature and character of God and is the spiritual leader of humankind (see New Covenant).
- Humankind is created with an immortal soul which death does not end—or a mortal soul that shall be resurrected and/or preserved by God—and which God will not wholly destroy.
- Sin has negative consequences for the sinner either in this life or the afterlife.

In 1899, the Universalist General Convention, later called the Universalist Church of America, adopted the Five Principles: the belief in God, belief in Jesus Christ, the immortality of the human soul, that sinful actions have consequence, and universal reconciliation.

== Views on hell ==
Christian universalists disagree on whether hell exists. However, they do agree that if it does exist, the punishment there is corrective, remedial and does not last forever.

=== Purgatorial hell and patristic universalism ===
Purgatorial universalism was the belief of some of the early Church Fathers, especially Greek-speaking ones such as Clement of Alexandria, Origen, and Gregory of Nyssa. It asserts that the unsaved will undergo hell but that hell is remedial (neither everlasting nor purely retributive) according to key scriptures and that after purification or conversion all will enter heaven.

Fourth-century Christian theologian and bishop Diodorus of Tarsus wrote: "For the wicked there are punishments, not perpetual, however, lest the immortality prepared for them should be a disadvantage, but they are to be purified for a brief period according to the amount of malice in their works. They shall therefore suffer punishment for a short space, but immortal blessedness having no end awaits them... the penalties to be inflicted for their many and grave sins are very far surpassed by the magnitude of the mercy to be shown to them."

Ilaria Ramelli, a scholar of the early Patristic history writes, "In the minds of some, universal salvation is a heretical idea that was imported into Christianity from pagan philosophies by Origen" (c. 185–253/54). Ramelli argues that this view is mistaken and that Christian theologians were the first people to proclaim that all will be saved and that their reasons for doing so were rooted in their faith in Christ.

Eastern Orthodox theologian David Bentley Hart makes the case on the basis of the earliest Christian writings, theological tradition, scripture, and logic, that if God is the good creator of all, he is the savior of all, without fail. In his book, That All Shall Be Saved, he calls opponents of the school, who believe that some or all people are condemned to eternal damnation, "infernalists". However, it has been argued that this term is pejorative.

=== Eternal hell in Christian history ===
Christian universalists assert that the doctrine of eternal Hell was not a part of Christ's teachings nor even the early church, and that it was added in. According to Christian annihilationist theologian Edward Beecher, in the first four centuries there were six main theological schools, and only one of them advocated the idea of eternal hell, while another believed in the absolute annihilation of the wicked.

==== Origins of the idea of hell as eternal ====
Christian universalists point towards mistranslations of the Greek word αιών (aion – an epoch of time), as giving rise to the idea of eternal hell. Dr. Ken Vincent writes "When it (aion) was translated into Latin Vulgate, aion became aeternam which means 'eternal'." He also states that the first written record of the idea of an eternal hell comes from Tertullian, who wrote in Latin. However, the first person to explicitly advocate for an eternal hell had actually been Greek-writing Tatian, not Tertullian.

The second major source of the idea of hell as eternal was the 4th-century theologian Augustine. According to author Steve Gregg, it was Tertullian's writings, plus Augustine's views and writings on eternal hell, which "overwhelmed" the other views of a temporary hell. First Augustine's views of hell were accepted in the early Latin Church, up until the Reformation Augustine's view of hell as eternal was not questioned.

==== Mistranslation of the Greek word aion ====
About the word aion as having connotations of "age" or "temporal", the 19th-century theologian Marvin Vincent wrote:

Aion, transliterated aeon, is a period of longer or shorter duration, having a beginning and an end, and complete in itself. Aristotle (peri ouranou, i. 9,15) says: "The period which includes the whole time of one's life is called the aeon of each one." Hence it often means the life of a man, as in Homer, where one's life (aion) is said to leave him or to consume away (Iliad v. 685; Odyssey v. 160). It is not, however, limited to human life; it signifies any period in the course of events, as the period or age before Christ; the period of the millennium; the mythological period before the beginnings of history.

The adjective aionios in like manner carries the idea of time. Neither the noun nor the adjective, in themselves, carry the sense of endless or everlasting. They may acquire that sense by their connotation, as, on the other hand, aidios, which means everlasting, has its meaning limited to a given point of time in Jude 6. Aionios means enduring through or pertaining to a period of time. Both the noun and the adjective are applied to limited periods.

Words which are habitually applied to things temporal or material cannot carry in themselves the sense of endlessness. Even when applied to God, we are not forced to render aionios everlasting. Of course the life of God is endless; but the question is whether, in describing God as aionios, it was intended to describe the duration of his being, or whether some different and larger idea was not contemplated.

More recently, universalist theologian David Bentley Hart has undertaken a study of the term, noting how aionios has a wide number of meaning: in addition to the traditional rendering of "eternal" and "age-lasting", it can also mean "of the Age to Come" or "having its source in Eternity", with Eternity intended not simply as something which never ends, but as the perfect, unchanging and always-existing trascendental reality which lies beyond the cosmos, which the Greeks called the "Aion" and the Christians identified with God.

For instance Hart's translation renders Matthew 25:46 as:

And these will go to the chastening of that Age, but the just to the life of that Age.

==== Arguments against the idea of eternal hell ====
Author Thomas Talbott states that if one believes in the idea of eternal hell or that some souls will be destroyed, one must either let go of the idea that it is God's wish and desire to save all beings, or accept the idea that God wants to, but will not "successfully accomplish his will and satisfy his own desire in this matter".

Author David Burnfield defends the postmortem view that God continues to evangelize to people even after they die (1 Chronicles 16:34; Isaiah 9:2; Romans 8:35–39; Ephesians 4:8–9; 1 Peter 3:18–20; 1 Peter 4:6).

== History ==
According to the New Schaff–Herzog Encyclopedia of Religious Knowledge (1912), over the first five hundred years of Christian history there are records of at least six theological schools: four of these schools were Universalist (one each in Alexandria, Antioch, Caesarea, and Edessa–Nisibis), one taught conditional immortality (in Ephesus), and the last taught eternal Hell (in Carthage or Rome). However, the Encyclopedia also notes that most contemporary scholars would take issue with classifying these early schools as Universalist.

An important figure in early American Christian Universalism was George de Benneville, a French Huguenot preacher and physician who was imprisoned for advocating Universalism and later emigrated to Pennsylvania where he continued preaching on the subject. De Benneville was noted for his friendly and respectful relationship with Native Americans and his pluralistic and multicultural view of spiritual truth which was well ahead of his time. One of his most significant accomplishments was helping to produce the Sauer Bible, the first German language Bible printed in America. In this Bible version, passages teaching universal reconciliation were marked in boldface.

Other significant early modern Christian universalist leaders include Elhanan Winchester, a Baptist preacher who wrote several books promoting the universal salvation of all souls after a period in Purgatory, who founded the first Universalist church in Philadelphia, and founded a church that ministered to enslaved African Americans in South Carolina; Hosea Ballou, a Christian ultra-universalist preacher and writer in New England, his relative Adin Ballou, a Christian universal restorationist who founded the first Christian socialist community in America and Hannah Whitall Smith, a writer and evangelist from a Quaker background who was active in the Holiness movement as well as the women's suffrage and temperance movements.

In 1803, to fulfill State requirements on their churches' legal status, the Universalist General Convention adopted the Winchester Profession. So long as one believed in an all-powerful and all-loving God who could and would save all of humankind, that was enough to be a universalist.

These vague guidelines led to the Restorationist Controversy, a de facto schism within the convention from the 1810s to 1840s. Ultra-universalists believed everyone experienced immediate salvation after death. However, the majority of Christian universalists, the universal restorationists believed that finite postmortem punishment exists after death with verses such as 1 Peter 3:18–20. As a result, the first Christian Universal Restorationist denomination, the Massachusetts Association of Universal Restorationists (MAUR) was formed in 1831, lasting until around 1841. Since then, universal restorationism has remained the majority belief among Christian universalists across centuries.

The Unity School of Christianity, founded in 1889 by Charles and Myrtle Fillmore, has taught some Universalist beliefs such as God's total goodness, the divine nature of human beings, and the rejection of the traditional Christian belief that God condemns people to Hell.

In the early 20th century, some Primitive Baptists in Appalachia started espousing Universalist ideas. By 1924, these churches branched off to form the Primitive Baptist Universalists. They are often known as "No Hellers" and believe that temporal punishment and separation from God during life is the only hell.

The logo of Universalist Church of America

The Universalist Church of America gradually declined in the early to mid 20th century and merged with the American Unitarian Association in 1961, creating the modern-day Unitarian Universalist Association, which does not officially subscribe to exclusively Christian theology. Christian universalism largely passed into obscurity for the next few decades with the end of the Universalist Church as a separate denomination. However, the Unitarian Universalist Christian Fellowship remains as an organization for Christians from the Unitarian Universalist tradition and liberal Christians interested in Unitarianism and Universalism.

Some Christians from a Pentecostal background who were involved in the Latter Rain Movement of the 1940s and 1950s came to believe in the ideas of Christian universalism on their own, separately from the Universalist Church tradition. They emphasized the teachings of universal reconciliation and theosis. These ideas were spread primarily through newsletters and traveling evangelists from the 1950s to 1980s, and were not typically identified by the term "Universalism". The only significant organization representing these beliefs that emerged within the Charismatic tradition was the Home Missions Church, a loosely organized network of ministers and house churches founded in 1944.

In May 2007 the Christian Universalist Association was founded at the Universalist National Memorial Church. The founding board of directors included thirteen ministers from diverse denominational backgrounds such as Quaker and Eastern Orthodox as an ecumenical organization promoting a revival of Christian universalism.

=== Universal reconciliation and pre-modern Christianity ===
Yale Professor of Philosophy Keith DeRose points out that in the Christian Scriptures there are verses which point to universal reconciliation and verses which point to destruction or eternal punishment for some. If looking only to scripture, he argues that Universalism is not only based in scripture, but has a stronger scriptural backing than the position of destruction or eternal damnation. Like early Christians, he points to Purgatorial Hell, a temporary place of cleansing of sin that will be necessary for some as a way to reconcile these seeming differences.

== Modern types ==
There are three general types of Christian universalism today – Evangelical Universalism, Charismatic Universalism, and Liberal Christian Universalism – which by themselves or in combination with one another describe the vast majority of currently existing and identifiable versions of Christian universalist belief and practice.

=== Evangelical Universalism ===
The type of Christian universalism that departs the least from orthodox or traditional Protestant Christian doctrine is Evangelical (Christian) Universalism, also called Biblical or Trinitarian Universalism. Evangelical Universalists hold to conservative positions on most theological or doctrinal issues except for the doctrine of hell, in which case they assert universal reconciliation instead of eternal torment. They tend to emphasize the substitutionary atonement of Jesus Christ for the sins of all humanity as the basis for their Universalism.

In 2006 a mainstream evangelical writer, revealed as Robin Parry in 2009, under the pseudonym of "Gregory MacDonald" (taken from the names, Gregory of Nyssa and George MacDonald) released a book, The Evangelical Universalist. In 2008 this inspired the creation of a forum, featuring "Gregory MacDonald" and Thomas Talbott, to discuss Evangelical Universalism and related topics. Evangelical Universalists derive a large part of their beliefs from Evangelicalism and Reformed theology. Many of them come from an Evangelical Christian background, but they may or may not identify with this movement and seek to remain with it.

Some Evangelical Universalists avoid using the word "Universalism" to describe their beliefs, perhaps because of the negative connotations of this word among conservative Christians. Alternative terms that are in use among Evangelical Universalists include the "Larger Hope" or "Blessed Hope" and the "Victorious Gospel".

=== Charismatic Universalism ===
Some Christians with a background in the Charismatic movement or Pentecostalism have developed a version of Universalism which could be called Charismatic (Christian) Universalism. Charismatic universalists usually do not call their theology "Universalism" but commonly refer to their specific beliefs by the terms "Reconciliation" (shorthand for universal reconciliation, the doctrine of apocatastasis) and "Sonship" (shorthand for "Manifest Sonship" which is a variant of the doctrine of theosis). The term "Feast of Tabernacles" is used by some Charismatic Universalists as a term for their post-Pentecostal spiritual tradition, reflecting a symbolic interpretation of this Jewish festival as an entrance into a fuller knowledge and relationship with God and understanding of God's plan for humanity.

Charismatic universalism is marked by its emphasis on theosis; the idea that the return of Christ is a body of perfected human beings who are the "Manifested Sons of God" instead of a literal return of the person of Jesus; the idea that these Sons will reign on the earth and transform all other human beings from sin to perfection during an age that is coming soon (a version of millennialism); and the absolute sovereignty of God, the nonexistence or severe limitation of human free will, and the inevitable triumph of God's plan of universal reconciliation.

Many Charismatic Universalists meet in house churches or do not belong to a church at all. Most of the evidence of Universalism existing as a school of thought within the Charismatic movement is found in a large number of internet-based ministries that are informally networked with one another.

=== Liberal Christian Universalism ===
Liberal Christian universalists include some members of mainline Protestant denominations, some people influenced by the New Age and New Thought movements, some people in the emerging church movement, some Unitarian Universalists who continue to follow Jesus as their primary spiritual teacher, and some Christians from other religious backgrounds.

Liberal Christian universalism emphasizes the all-inclusive love of God and tends to be more open to finding truth and value in non-Christian spiritual traditions compared to the attitude of other forms of Christian universalism, while remaining generally Christ-centered. In contrast to Evangelical Universalism, Liberal Christian universalism views the Bible as an imperfect human document containing divine revelations, is not necessarily Trinitarian, and often downplays or rejects blood atonement theology in its view of the crucifixion of Jesus. Some Liberal Christian universalists believe in mystical philosophies such as panentheism and process theology, Gnostic or New Age ideas such as the preexistence and reincarnation of the soul, and New Thought ideas such as the law of attraction.

The Unitarian Universalist Christian Fellowship is an organization for Liberal Christian universalists, especially those who belong to the Unitarian Universalist Association. The Unity Church is a liberal Christian denomination which teaches some Universalist beliefs.

The Liberal Catholic Church believes in Universal Salvation. Within its articles of faith it declares: "We believe that God is Love and Power and Truth and Light; that perfect justice rules the world; that all His sons shall one day reach His feet, however far they stray."

=== Hybrid types ===
Prior to his death in November 2023, former Pentecostal Bishop Carlton Pearson promoted his "Gospel of Inclusion" with his teachings and beliefs being a hybrid between Charismatic and Liberal Christian universalism. A minister in the liberal Christian denomination of the United Church of Christ, Pearson continued to believe in ideas and practices of Pentecostal or Charismatic forms of Christianity. Pearson incorporated New Age and New Thought teachings into his message. Pearson was declared a heretic by his Christian Pentecostal and Charismatic peers in 2004.

Brian McLaren is a Christian leader in the emerging church movement who is sympathetic to the idea of Universalism but does not embrace it.

The Dutch writer Reinier Sonneveld published The End of Hell in 2025, that won the Prize for the Best Theological Book of that year and was one of the best sold theological titles that year.

A number of ministers and evangelists connected with Restoration Nation conferences are Universalists who draw from both the Evangelical and Charismatic traditions. One notable example is Robert Rutherford, a minister from Georgia (USA) who was a finalist on The Learning Channel's 2006 reality TV series The Messengers. Another example is Dick King, an independent Charismatic Baptist pastor in North Little Rock, Arkansas, whose church left the Southern Baptist Convention in 2004.

=== Modern proponents ===
The conversion of Bishop Carlton Pearson to a form of Universalism and his subsequent excommunication by the Joint College of African-American Pentecostal Bishops in 2004 caused Christian universalism to gain increased media attention because of Pearson's popularity and celebrity status.

Since 2007, the Christian Universalist Association has ordained more than 30 ministers in the United States and other countries who believe in Christian universalism.

In 2024, Pope Francis said that "What I am going to say is not a dogma of faith but my own personal view: I like to think of hell as empty; I hope it is." A proponent of the idea of universal salvation is also the Polish Cardinal Grzegorz Ryś, who in an interview on September 26, 2024, claimed that "[...] all people, regardless of which religion they profess, Or Whether They Profess None At All, are saved through the death, resurrection, and ascension of the Lord Jesus".

=== Disagreements ===
There are many religious issues on which Christian universalists disagree with each other, depending on their theological background and denominational tradition. Some examples include:

- Disagreements on if the concept of the Trinity is true (Trinitarian universalism, held by Edward Turner) or not (Unitarian universalism, held by Bernard Whitman).
- Debate on if Christian universalism is fulfilled through God's predetermined divine sovereignty to save all (divine sovereignty universalism), each person's free will to eventually decide they want to be saved (free will universalism) or both (compatibilism universalism).
- If universal salvation is equivalent to universal reconciliation (held by David Bentley Hart) or not (held by John Murray).
- Various views of atonement, such as whether postmortem punishment exists (universal restorationism, held by Adin Ballou, Hosea Ballou II) or not (ultra-universalism, held by Hosea Ballou, Thomas Whittemore).
- Whether non-Christians need to have belief in Jesus Christ as their savior to be saved (exclusivism via free grace or lordship salvation or etc.), or whether salvation is possible through other means (inclusivism).

== See also ==
- Annihilationism
- Apokatastasis
- Catechetical School of Alexandria
- Divinization (Christian)
- Essence–energies distinction
- Hypothetical universalism
- List of Christian Universalists
- Love of Christ
- Love of God in Christianity
- Omnibenevolence
- Primitive Baptist Universalist
- Problem of Hell
- Salvation (Christianity)
- School of Antioch
- Schools of Nisibis and Edessa
- Trinitarian Universalism
- Unconditional love
- Unlimited atonement
- "Unto the ages of ages"
