= Hell in Catholicism =

Catholic theology regarding damnation

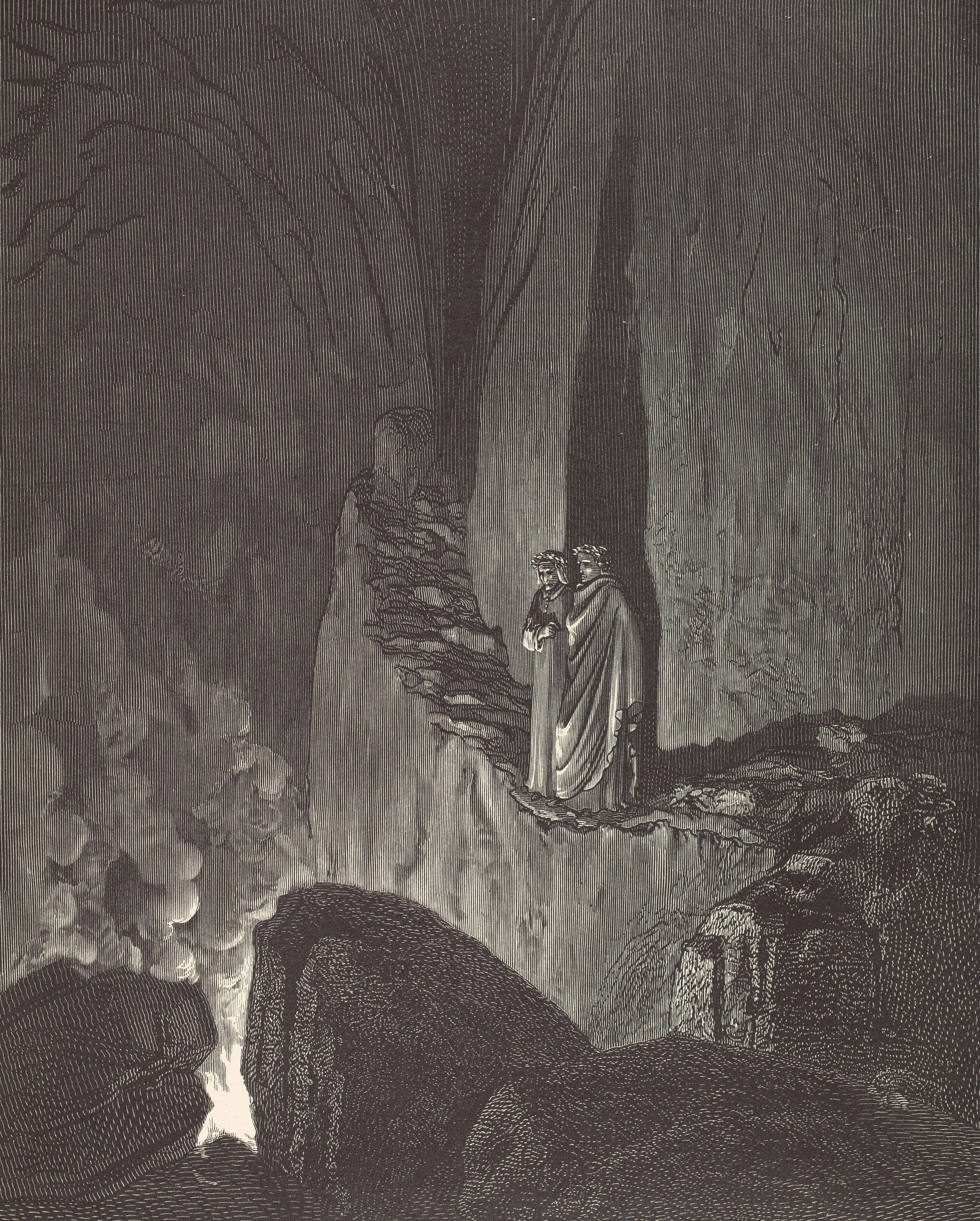
Hell as depicted by Gustav Doré (1866)

According to the Catholic Church, hell is the "state of definitive self-exclusion from communion with God and the blessed" which occurs by the refusal to repent of mortal sin before one's death, since mortal sin deprives one of sanctifying grace.

== Definition ==
In Catholic theology, the term hell – translated from Latin infernus, Greek ᾍδης (Hades), and Hebrew שְׁאוֹל (Sheol) – can most broadly refer to any "abode" where souls, after death, reside who "have not obtained the happiness of heaven". These abodes include the following three:

1. Hell of the Damned, also known as "Gehenna" (Hebrew: גֵּיהִנּוֹם), is hell strictly speaking, which the Catholic Church defines as the "state of definitive self-exclusion from communion with God and the blessed".
2. Purgatory is where just souls are cleansed from any defilement before entering Heaven.
3. Limbo of the Fathers, also known as "Abraham's Bosom", where just souls before Christ awaited Heaven. It is to this abode that the Catholic Church teaches Christ descended.

To these three, theologians historically add a fourth as well: Limbo of the Infants, where souls who die in original sin but without any personal mortal sin reside.

All further references to hell are to its common designation, i.e., Hell of the Damned.

== Teachings ==
=== Basis ===
The Catholic Church bases its teaching on hell primarily on various New Testament passages such as Matthew 5:22, 5:29, 10:28, 13:41-42, and 25:41.

=== Existence and eternity ===
The Catholic Church affirms "the existence of hell and its eternity", holding that "those who have responded to the love and piety of God [go] to eternal life, those who have refused them to the end [go] to the fire that is not extinguished". The Catholic Church teaches that the existence of Hell began with the rejection of God by the fallen angels or demons. Human beings who die in the state of mortal sin descend to Hell as well; although, it cannot be known now if a particular human person has died in mortal sin. The Catholic Church teaches that the eternity of Hell is due to the "irrevocable character of [the damned's] choice, and not a defect in the infinite divine mercy". The choice to not love God by the angels in their Fall and by human beings at death is a permanent choice so that no future repentance by them is possible.

== Church Fathers ==
In Catholic theology, the writings of the Church Fathers are considered to be sacred tradition.

=== Individual opinions ===
Some of the Church Fathers listed certain people who go to hell. Ignatius of Antioch said hell awaits "corruptors of families", Clement of Rome neglecters of "his commandments", Justin Martyr "the evildoer, the avaricious, and the treacherous"; Theophilus of Antioch "the unbelievers", the contemptuous and "those who do not submit to the truth but assent to iniquity"; Irenaeus "those who do not believe the Word of God and despise his coming"; Hippolytus "lovers of evil"; Lactantius "unrighteous"; and Cyril of Jerusalem "a sinner" who "blaspheme[s] [...] commit[s] fornication [...] [and] rob[s]". The history of Christian universalism includes prominent patristic theologians such as Clement of Alexandria, Origen, and Gregory of Nyssa.

== Council of Trent ==
The Catholic Church believes an ecumenical council, along with the pope, can under certain circumstances define doctrines infallibly. The Council of Trent taught that "those who commit infidelity, [...] fornicators, adulterers, effeminate, liers with mankind, thieves, covetous, drunkards, railers, extortioners, and all others who commit deadly sins" lose sanctifying grace.

== Popes ==
According to the Catechism of the Catholic Church, Catholics owe the bishops obsequium religiosum when they speak non-infallibly.

=== Pius X ===
Pope Pius X taught that the torment of the damned consists of the deprivation of the beatific vision and various punishments, which will afflict the soul before the resurrection of the dead and afflict both body and soul after it, and which will be eternal and terrible for all the damned, but different in degree or measure based on one's sins.

=== John Paul II ===
Pope John Paul II taught that hell, which is spoken of symbolically in the Bible, does not just refer to a place, but principally refers to the state of "definitive self-exclusion from God", and that no one can know who is in hell except by special revelation.

=== Benedict XVI ===
Pope Benedict XVI's March 25, 2007 homily on hell was interpreted by some journalists as saying that hell is a place.

== Catechisms ==
The Catechism of the Council of Trent teaches that the damned are eternally deprived of the beatific vision. They will not receive any consolations in hell, escape from the pain of hellfire, or have any company except for the demons that tempted them.

The 1992 Catechism of the Catholic Church states that no one is predestined to hell, since, for damnation to be even possible, "a willful turning away from God (a mortal sin) is necessary, and persistence in it until the end".

== Thomas Aquinas ==
In the Summa Theologica, Thomas Aquinas taught that hell is reserved for the wicked and the unbaptized immediately after death, but that those who die only in original sin will not suffer in hell. On Judgment Day, the punishment of hell will consist of fire and of "whatever is ignoble and sordid", since "all the elements conduce to the torture of the damned", who "placed their end in material things". The worm of the damned is a guilty conscience, that the damned will suffer over the fact of having separated themselves from God, that the damned will physically weep on Judgement Day, that hell is so full of darkness that the damned can only see things which will torment them, that the "disposition of hell" is "utmost unhappiness", that the fire of hell is non-physical (before Judgment Day) and physical (at Judgment Day), that the physical fire of hell will not be made of matter, and that whether or not hell is under the earth is unknown. The suffering of punishment is according to one's sins, so that some will suffer more, in deeper and darker pits of hell, than others.

== Personal visions ==
=== By saints ===
In Catholicism, saints are people who are venerated for their holiness on earth and eternal life in heaven. Some claimed to receive visions of or about hell.

==== Columba of Iona ====
Columba of Iona (521-597) is alleged to have on several occasions even been able to name particular individuals who he said were going to end life in Hell for their sins and accurately predicted the way they would die.

==== Catherine of Siena ====
Catherine of Siena (1347-1380), a Doctor of the Church, claimed that Jesus told her that there are four main torments of hell that the other torments of hell proceed from: the loss of the beatific vision, the worm of a guilty conscience, the vision and company of Satan, and the pain of the eternal flames. She also claimed that Jesus told her that the torments of hell are suffered according to one's sins; for example, the vision of Satan is at its worst for those who commit the worst sins.

==== John Bosco ====
John Bosco (1815-1888) claimed to have dreamed about hell. He said he was walking down a broad pleasant path that was laden with various traps – traps which prayer could prevent and the sacraments could remedy – and that the path suddenly ended in a chasm of fire, where many of the boys he taught were being tormented for their sins.

==== Faustina ====
Faustina Kowalska (1905-1938) claimed to have had visited the "chasms of hell" when her guardian angel took her there, where she saw many people who disbelieved in the existence of hell. Faustina also claimed to have seen Catholic nuns in hell for breaking their vows of silence, as well as souls whom God had marked for great holiness. She further claimed that Jesus told her that, when a sinner repents of sin, Satan flies away to the bottom of hell in fear, and that, when a soul is damned, it plunges Jesus into mortal agony.

=== Marian ===
In Catholicism, various supernatural appearances by Mary, the mother of Jesus, have been claimed, and some apparitions have been formally approved, such as the famous apparition of Our Lady of Guadalupe. The Catholic Church does not consider approved apparitions, or private revelations, to add anything new to the teaching of Christ and his apostles, or public revelation, and belief in an apparition is never required of the Catholic faithful. In some of these approved apparitions, the visionaries have claim to see Hell.

==== Our Lady of Fatima ====
Sister Lúcia and Francisco and Jacinta Marto claimed that Our Lady of Fatima showed them a vision of hell while declaring: "You have seen hell where the souls of poor sinners go. To save them, God wishes to establish in the world devotion to my Immaculate Heart."

==== Our Lady of Kibeho ====
Alphonsine Mumureke claimed that Our Lady of Kibeho took her to hell, which she described as a "most fearsome hot furnace where the only light was a shade of red".

== See also ==
- Hell in Christianity
- Damnation
- Jahannam
- Problem of Hell
