= Adams Streeter =

Adams Streeter (December 31, 1735 – September 14, 1786) was an American clergyman and the first minister of the Universalist congregations in Oxford and Milford, Massachusetts.

Born in Framingham, Massachusetts, the son of Stephen and Catherine (Adams) Streeter, with whom he removed at an early age to Douglass, he was the first pastor of the First Universalist Church in Boston, where later his relations Sebastian Streeter (1783-1867) and his brother Russell (1791-1880) served. Editor of the Christian Intelligencer from 1822, Russell became minister of the First Universalist Society in Portland, Maine. Adams' brother Zebulon was also an early Universalist pastor.
