= Primitive Baptist Universalist =

American congregational church

The Primitive Baptist Universalists are Christian Universalist congregations located primarily in the central Appalachian region of the United States. They are popularly known as "No-Hellers" due to their belief that there is no Hell in itself, but that Hell is actually experienced in this life.

== History ==
Although they did not split as a denomination away from other Primitive Baptists until 1924, the Primitive Baptist Universalists (PBUs) have been theologically distinct as Universalists since at least 1907, when the minutes of the Washington District Primitive Baptist Association record a reproval:

Resolved, that whereas, we have been troubled with the doctrine of universalism that we advise the churches that if they have any elders preaching such heresies, or members arguing it, that they admonish them to quit preaching it or talking it, and if they fail to hear them to withdraw fellowship from such, and especially we admonish Hale Creek church to admonish Elder M. L. Compton to refrain from such doctrine.

== Theology ==
Baptist minister and historian Bill Leonard has characterized PBU beliefs as the result of "press[ing] ... Calvinism to the ... conclusion that Christ's redemption is so powerful that all will be redeemed." According to Leonard, PBUs believe "It's hell enough down here."

Specific tenets of PBU theology include:

- Universal reconciliation: Christ's atonement was for all humanity, and at Resurrection all humanity will be reunited with Christ for an eternity in Heaven.
- Hell is a factor of the temporal world, where temporal sins will be punished by an increased separation from God.
- Satan is an entity solely of the temporal world, existing only as "natural man" warring against "spiritual man."
- Sin, punishment, and death are factors only of the temporal world, thus ceasing to exist after Resurrection, and sin is punished in the temporal world by a separation from God.
- The joy of righteousness is its own reward, so retribution and reward are needed only for the here and now.

== Numbers and structure ==
Primitive Baptists do not participate in censuses of religious denominations, so there are no solid data on the number of PBUs or other Primitive Baptist groups. Bill Leonard estimated in 2011 that there were 1,000 or fewer PBU adherents in total, concentrated in 20 counties in Appalachia.

There are four associations of PBU congregations consisting of a total of thirty-three congregations located in area of northeastern Tennessee, Virginia, West Virginia and Kentucky, with three PBU fellowships in Ohio, one in Pennsylvania, and Mt. Pleasant Primitive Baptist Church in Grayson, Louisiana:

- Regular Primitive Baptist Washington District Association
- The Three Forks of Powell's River Regular Primitive Baptist Association
- Elkhorn Primitive Baptist Association (1st)
- Elkhorn Primitive Baptist Association (2nd)

== Notable Primitive Baptist Universalists ==
- Ralph Stanley, bluegrass musician.
