= Robin Parry =

British theologian and writer

- Occupations: Author, literary editor
- Children: Two daughters
- Writing career
- Pen name: Gregory MacDonald
- Language: English language
- Notable works: Old Testament Story and Christian Ethics: The Rape of Dinah as a Case Study; Worshipping Trinity: Coming Back to the Heart of Worship; The Evangelical Universalist; Lamentations: The Two Horizons Old Testament Commentary; Deep Church Rising: The Third Schism and the Recovery of Christian Orthodoxy (with Andrew Walker); The Biblical Cosmos: A Pilgrim's Guide to the Weird and Wonderful World of the Bible
- Website: theologicalscribbles.blogspot.com

Robin Parry is a Christian theologian particularly known for advocating Christian universalism. His best known book is The Evangelical Universalist, which he wrote under the pseudonym Gregory MacDonald because he had not at the time publicly expressed his belief in universalism.

== Early career ==
Parry completed his PhD on Genesis 34 under the supervision of Gordon J. Wenham and Craig Bartholomew at the University of Gloucestershire. He was a sixth form college teacher in Worcester, UK, for eleven years, before starting work in publishing in 2001 for Paternoster Press and, since 2010, for Wipf & Stock Publishers.

== Interviews ==
After Parry's book Worshipping Trinity was published, Grace Communion International had an extensive interview with him on "the importance of having a trinitarian perspective in our worship".

Due to the controversial nature of his book "The Evangelical Universalist," Parry has appeared twice as a guest on Premier Christian Radio. He was also interviewed in "Hellbound?", the movie documentary, and in numerous online podcasts and blogs.

== Works ==
- Christopher H. Partridge and Robin A. Parry, ed. (2003). Universal Salvation?: The Current Debate. Carlisle/Grand Rapids: Paternoster/Eerdmans.
- Parry, Robin (2004). Old Testament Story and Christian Ethics: The Rape of Dinah as a Case Study. Leicester/Grand Rapids: IVP/Kregel.
- Craig Bartholomew; Robin Parry; Andrew West, eds. (2004). The Futures of Evangelicalism: Issues and Prospects. Leicester/Grand Rapids: IVP/Kregel.
- Craig Bartholomew; Mary Healy; Karl Möller; Robin Parry, eds. (2004). Out of Egypt: Biblical Theology and Biblical Interpretation. Carlisle/Grand Rapids: Paternoster/Zondervan.
- Parry, Robin (2005). Worshipping Trinity: Coming Back to the Heart of Worship. Carlisle: Paternoster.
- Parry, Robin (2012). Worshipping Trinity: Coming Back to the Heart of Worship. Second Edition. Eugene, OR: Cascade.
- Craig Bartholomew; Scott Hahn; Robin Parry; Christopher Seitz; Al Wolters, eds. (2006). Canon and Biblical Interpretation. Carlisle/Grand Rapids: Paternoster/Zondervan.
- Gregory MacDonald. (2006). The Evangelical Universalist. Eugene, OR/London: Cascade Books/SPCK.
- Gregory MacDonald. (2012). The Evangelical Universalist: Second Edition. Eugene, OR: Cascade Books/SPCK.
- Mary Healy and Robin Parry, ed. (2007). The Bible and Epistemology: Biblical Soundings on the Knowledge of God. Milton Keynes: Pateroster.
- Gregory MacDonald, ed. (2010). All Shall Be Well: Explorations in Christian Universalism from Origen to Moltmann. Eugene, OR: Cascade Books.
- Robin Parry. (2010). Lamentations. The Two Horizons Old Testament Commentary. Grand Rapids: Eerdmans.
- William K. Kay and Robin Parry, ed. (2011). Exorcism & Deliverance: Interdisciplinary Studies. Milton Keynes: Paternoster.
- Robin Parry and Heath Thomas, ed. (2011). Great Is Thy Faithfulness? Reading Lamentations as Sacred Scripture. Eugene, OR: Pickwick.
- Andrew Walker & Robin Parry (2014). Deep Church Rising: The Third Schism and the Recovery of Christian Orthodoxy. Eugene, OR/London: Cascade/SPCK.
- Robin Parry (illustrated by Hannah Parry) (2014). The Biblical Cosmos: A Pilgrims Guide to the Weird and Wonderful World of the Bible. Eugene, OR: Cascade.
- Robin Parry, with Ilaria Ramelli (2019). A Larger Hope?, Volume 2: Universal Salvation from the Reformation to the Nineteenth Century. Eugene, OR: Cascade.
