= Thomas Talbott =

American theologian and academic

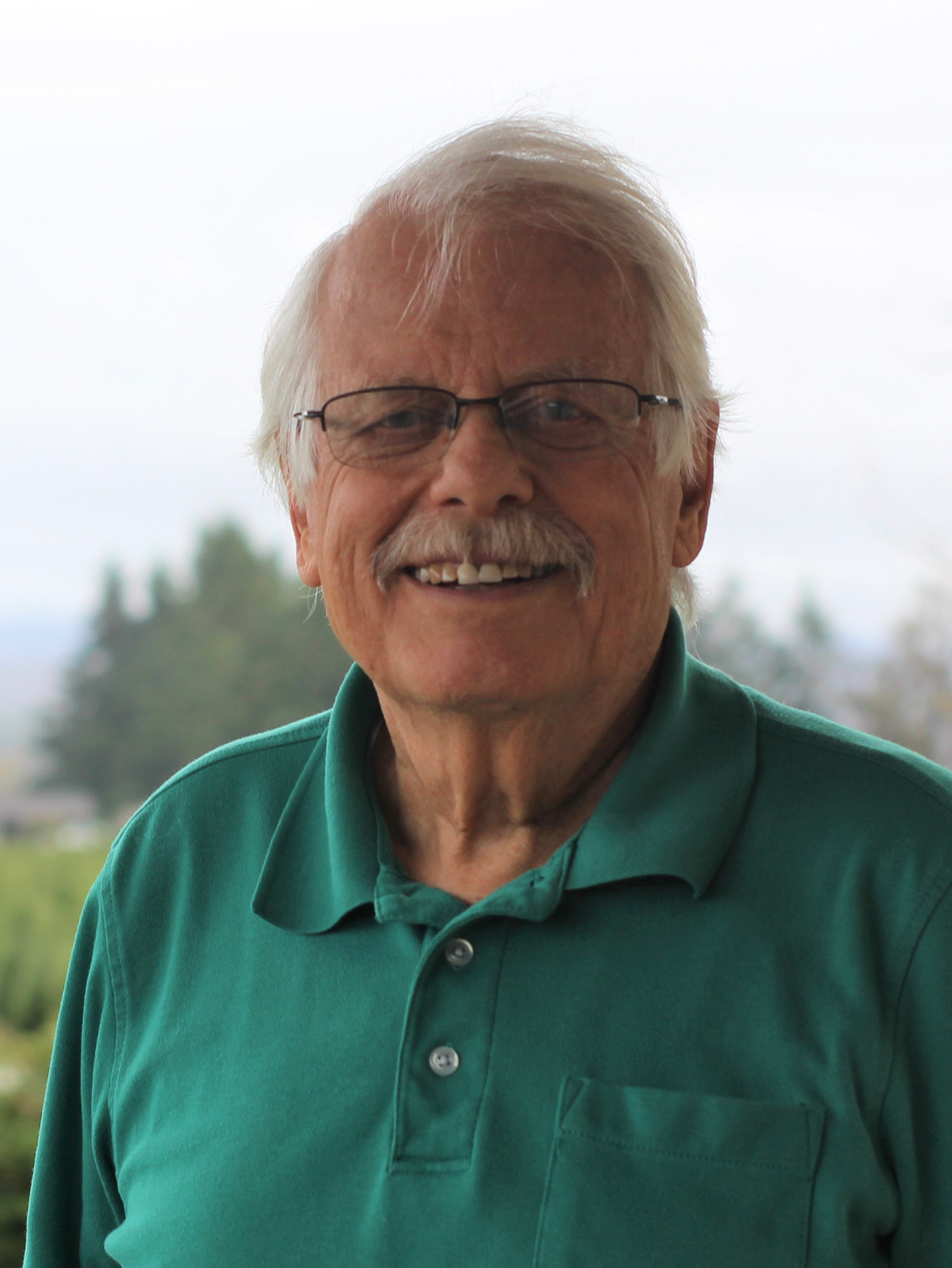
Thomas Talbott

Thomas Talbott is an American philosopher, theologian, and academic, who is Professor Emeritus of Philosophy at Willamette University, Salem, Oregon. He is best known for his advocacy of trinitarian universalism.

The 2003 book Universal Salvation?: The Current Debate presents Talbott's defense of Trinitarian universalism together with responses from various fields theologians, philosophers, church historians and other religious scholars supporting or opposing Talbott's universalism.

Talbott contributed the chapter on "Universalism" for The Oxford Handbook of Eschatology.

== Universalist argument ==
Talbott has offered three propositions which many traditional Christians believe are biblically based but Talbott considers cannot all be true at the same time:

1. God is entirely loving and wills that all people be reconciled to Him in relationship.
2. God is totally sovereign over human destinies.
3. Most people will experience endless, conscious torment in hell.

== Problem of evil ==
In the September 1987 edition of the periodical Christian Scholar's Review, Talbott sought, as he explains in a more recent comment, "to make some ideas then current in the philosophical literature available to a wider audience of non-philosophers." He sought to explain, for example, how Alvin Plantinga's Free Will Defense had transformed the way in which contemporary philosophers approach the so-called problem of evil and why, in particular, even atheistic philosophers came to abandon the claim that evil is logically inconsistent with the existence of God. But at the end of this article, Talbott also ventured into more controversial territory, suggesting ways in which even the tragic suffering of innocent children might contribute, in the end, to the future blessedness of all people (including the children who suffer). In accordance with his affirmation of universal reconciliation, he thus expressed the hopeful belief that "every innocent child who suffers will one day look upon that suffering as a privilege because of the joy it has made possible: the joy of knowing that one has been used by God in the redemption of others, the joy of that final union or reunion in which love's triumph is complete and all separation from others is finally overcome. I would ask but two things of those who [might understandably] reject such a view: first, that they resist the temptation to moralize, and second, that they consider the alternatives carefully."

Others have, not surprisingly, roundly criticized and even ridiculed such a view. According to John Beversluis, Emeritus Professor of Philosophy at Butler University, for example, Talbott's view is "so outrageous...that I will not dignify it with a reply....If Talbott is right, he is logically committed and morally obliged to oppose everyone dedicated to alleviating world hunger, ridding the world of terrorism, finding a cure for cancer...and so forth." But in an equally hard-hitting reply, Talbott dismisses this claim by comparing it to a more precise claim of the following form: "If Talbott is right in accepting [proposition] p (where p is specifically identified), then Talbott is logically committed to q." He then points out that a cogent argument in the present context would require two things of Beversluis: "first, that he identify a relevant instance of p, and second, that he make some attempt to deduce q from p. But Beversluis," Talbott insists, "does not so much as identify the proposition that he claims logically commits me to the moral obligation he alleges; much less does he make the required deduction."

Talbott acknowledges, however, that his optimistic view could be regarded as a case of wishful thinking. But he goes on to contrast hope with despair, arguing that, unlike despair, hope is compatible with a healthy skepticism.

== Works ==
- Thomas Talbott (1999). The Inescapable Love of God. Parkland, Fla: Universal Publishers. ISBN 1-58112-831-2.
- Thomas Talbott (2022). Understanding the Free-Will Controversy. Cascade Books. ISBN 1-7252-6836-1
