= Problem of Hell =

Ethical problem in religion

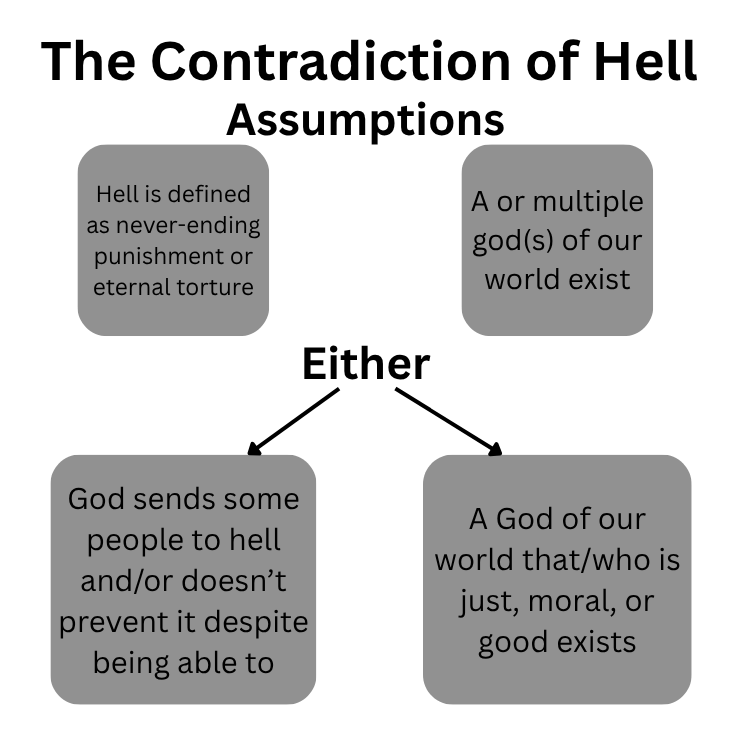
A diagram illustrating the problem of Hell

The problem of Hell is a purported ethical problem in the Abrahamic religions of Christianity and Islam, in which the existence of Hell or Jahannam for the punishment of souls in the afterlife is regarded as inconsistent with the notion of a just, moral, and omnipotent, omnibenevolent, omniscient supreme being. Also regarded as inconsistent with such a just being is the combination of human free will—on which the justification for eternal damnation for sinners is predicated—and the divine qualities of omniscience (being all-knowing) and omnipotence (being all-powerful), as this would mean God (not humans) would determine everything that has happened and will happen in the universe—including sinful human behavior.

C. P. Ragland of Saint Louis University writes in the Internet Encyclopedia of Philosophy that the problem of hell is "a version of" the problem of evil. He defines the problem of hell: "If there is an omniperfect God—one that necessarily has the perfection of Goodness—then no one will be damned."

The problem of hell derives from four key propositions:

1. Hell exists.
2. It is for the punishment of people whose lives on Earth are judged to have been sinful.
3. Some people go there.
4. There is no escape (recognized by religious traditions advocating eternal punishment; for religious traditions recognizing Hell as a realm, like any other, where the period of a being's life is of limited duration due to impermanence and reincarnation, see Buddhism or Hinduism)

== Issues and criticisms ==
There are several major issues within the problem of Hell.

- The definition of Hell.
- Whether the existence of Hell is compatible with the existence of a just God.
- Whether Hell is compatible with God's mercy, especially as articulated in Christianity.
- Whether Hell is compatible with the concept of an all-loving God.
- Whether any sin or combination of sins could warrant never-ending punishment or eternal torture.
- Whether free will is compatible with God's omnipotence and omniscience.

Traditionally Hell is defined in Christianity and Islam as one of two abodes of Afterlife for human beings (the other being Heaven or Jannah), and the one where sinners suffer torment eternally. There are several words in the original languages of the Bible that are translated into the word 'Hell' in English. There are also a number of names in the Quran that translate as hell, perhaps the most common one being Jahannam. In at least some versions of Christianity there is a question of whether or not Hell is actually populated forever. If it is not, one must suppose that those populating Hell may eventually die, or that God will ultimately restore all immortal souls in the World to Come, i.e. Heaven, which would at least lessen the issue of divine injustice and deal with one of the key propositions of there being "no escape". This is known as the universal reconciliation doctrine. In Islam it is commonly thought that Muslim sinners will not spend eternity in Hell but spend time there to be purified of their sins before being allowed into Heaven.

The question of compatibility of free will on the one hand, and God's omnipotence and omniscience on the other, can be framed as:

... "Does God know or does He not know that a certain individual will be good or bad? If thou sayest 'He knows', then it necessarily follows that the man is compelled to act as God knew beforehand how he would act; otherwise, God's knowledge would be imperfect...." (Jewish philosopher Moses Maimonides)

An early Islamic school of thought known as Muʿtazila could not accept the orthodoxy of determinism since it meant that a person "could be punished for acts which God himself had commanded him to perform". Muʿtazila were then accused of the heresy of "dualism" because they gave human beings 'power' over their actions (free will), which made them the 'creator' of their works, and "thus encroached on the almighty power of God, for there would be two creators of actions".

In some respects, the problem of Hell is similar to the problem of evil, with the suffering in Hell equivalent to the suffering of victims of evil in the temporal world. Framed this way, the suffering of Hell is caused by free will and something God could not have prevented; or worse still is caused by the lack of free will, as God's omniscience—His knowing/determining all that will ever happen in His creation, including human acts of good and evil—makes free will impossible and souls predestined, but God still decrees punishment in hell. The problem of Hell could be viewed as the worst and most intractable instance of the problem of evil.

If one believes in the idea of eternal Hell, unending suffering, or the idea that some souls will perish (whether destroyed by God or otherwise), author Thomas Talbott says that one has to either let go of the idea that God wishes to save all beings (suggesting that God is not omnibenevolent), or accept the idea that God wants to save all, but will not "successfully accomplish his will and satisfy his own desire in this matter" (suggesting that He is not omnipotent and omniscient).

== Judaism ==
Judaism teaches that the soul continues to exist after death, and that it is subject to both reward and punishment after death. However, this punishment is held to be temporary, normally only lasting up to 12 months after death. After this period, the soul is able to enjoy the light of God in the afterlife. Because the punishment is temporary, the problem of Hell in the Christian sense is less applicable to Judaism. Both non-Jews and Jews have a share in the world to come, if they are righteous.

== Christianity ==
In Christianity, Hell has traditionally been regarded as a place or state of punishment for wrongdoing or sin in the mortal life, as a manifestation of divine justice. Nonetheless, the extreme severity and/or infinite duration of the punishment might be seen as incompatible with justice. However, Hell is not seen as strictly a matter of retributive justice even by the more traditionalist churches. For example, the Eastern Orthodox see it as a condition brought about by, and the natural consequence of, free rejection of God's love.

In some ancient Eastern Christian traditions, (such as 7th century Syriac Christianity), Hell and Heaven are distinguished not spatially, but by the relation of a deceased person to God's love.

I also maintain that those who are punished in Gehenna, are scourged by the scourge of love. Nay, what is so bitter and vehement as the torment of love?...It would be improper for a man to think that sinners in Gehenna are deprived of the love of God...it torments sinners...Thus I say that this is the torment of Gehenna: bitter regret.

— St. Isaac of Syria, Ascetical Homilies 28, Page 141

In terms of the Bible itself, issues of salvation and access to heaven or to hell are mentioned frequently. Examples include John 3:16 "For God so loved the world, that he gave his only begotten Son, that whosoever believeth in him should not perish, but have everlasting life." which tends to show the wicked perish and the saints have everlasting life or John 3:36 (NIV), "Whoever believes in the Son has eternal life, but whoever rejects the Son will not see life, for God's wrath remains on them", and 2 Thessalonians 1:8–9 (NIV), "Those who do not know God and do not obey the gospel of our Lord Jesus, they will be punished with everlasting destruction and shut out from the presence of the Lord and from the glory of his might."

The minority Christian doctrine that sinners perish and are destroyed rather than punished eternally such as is found in John 3:16 "That whosoever believeth in him should not perish, but have eternal life.", is referred to as Christian mortalism; annihilation for those not awarded immortal life, conditional immortality for those who are. This Christian view is found in early Christianity, resurfaced in the Reformation, and since 1800 has found increasing support among Protestant theologians.

=== Justice ===
Some opponents of the traditional doctrine of Hell claim that the punishment is disproportionate to any crimes that could be committed. Because human beings have a finite lifespan, they can commit only a finite number of sins, yet Hell is an infinite punishment. In this vein, Jorge Luis Borges suggests in his essay La duración del Infierno that no transgression can warrant an infinite punishment on the grounds that there is no such thing as an "infinite transgression". Philosopher Immanuel Kant argued in 1793 in Religion within the Bounds of Bare Reason that since morality lies ultimately in a person's disposition, and as disposition is concerned with the adoption of universal principles, or as he called them: "maxims", every human being is guilty of, in one sense, an infinite amount of violations of the law, and consequently an infinite punishment is not unjustified.

=== Divine mercy ===
Another issue is the problem of harmonizing the existence of Hell with God's infinite mercy or omnibenevolence which is found in scripture.

Some modern critics of the doctrine of Hell (such as Marilyn McCord Adams) claim that, even if Hell is seen as a choice rather than as punishment, it would be unreasonable for God to give such flawed and ignorant creatures as ourselves the responsibility of our eternal destinies. Jonathan Kvanvig, in The Problem of Hell (1993), agrees that God would not allow one to be eternally damned by a decision made under the wrong circumstances. One should not always honor the choices of human beings, even when they are full adults, if, for instance, the choice is made while depressed or careless. On Kvanvig's view, God will abandon no person until they have made a settled, final decision, under favorable circumstances, to reject God, but God will respect a choice made under the right circumstances. Once a person finally and competently chooses to reject God, out of respect for the person's autonomy, God allows them to be annihilated.

=== Catholicism ===
==== Official teaching ====
The Catholic Church does not believe in the problem of hell, but believes - as dogma - that because God is all-good he condemns the impenitent to eternal punishment in hell at death and at the Last Judgment. This dogma was defined by the Council of Trent based on Jesus' teaching of the same during his public ministry and when "he descended into hell."

The church also teaches that hell is a place of punishment brought about by a person's self-exclusion from communion with God. Hell is the free and continual rejection of God's forgiveness of sins. This rejection takes the form of the committing of a mortal sin without repentance. (This does not include original sin, since it is not an evil deed, since no one is predestined to hell, and since Feeneyism is the heresy that non-Catholics and excommunicated Catholics cannot be saved) A sinner, once in hell, will inevitably refuse to turn away from his mortal sin to God's forgiveness. Accordingly, hell must endure as chief punishment for this continuing lack of repentance.

==== Unofficial teaching ====
Some theologians speculate about the reason for the creation and eternity of hell. A common argument made is from divine justice: as the righteous receive an eternal reward (God) for a temporary good deed, so the wicked receive an eternal punishment (loss of God) for a temporary evil deed. Another common argument is that the loss of God includes the loss of one's good inclinations and desires, so that all that remains is evil inclinations and desires (whereby the demons and the damned refuse to repent).

Thomas Aquinas said that not all punishment is remedial or temporary, such as capital punishment, and that hell fits this exception. He further said that, by being confined to hell, the wicked cannot commit sin among the righteous in heaven.

According to Catherine of Siena, Jesus told her of the righteous in heaven: "Their will is so one with mine that even if a father and mother saw their child in hell, or a child its parent, it would not trouble them: They would even be content to see them punished, since they are my enemies."

== Islam ==
In Islam, Jahannam (hell) is the final destiny and place of punishment in Afterlife for those guilty of disbelief and (according to some interpretations) evil doing in their lives on earth. Hell is regarded as necessary for Allah's (God's) divine justice and justified by God's absolute sovereignty, and an "integral part of Islamic theology". In addition to the question of whether divine mercy (one of Names of God in Islam is "The Merciful" ar-Raḥīm) is compatible with consigning sinners to hell, is whether "predestination" of souls to hell by God is just. One of six articles of faith in Sunni Islam is God's control over everything that has happened and will happen in the universe—including sinful human behavior and who will go to Jahannam. This introduces the question, (or at least the paradox), where sinners are said to be punished in Jahannam for their decision to sin of their own free will, but everything that happens in the world is determined by an all powerful and all knowing God.

=== The inhabitants of Hell ===
Muslims and Islamic scholars disagree over who will be consigned to Jahannam. A common concern is the fate of non-Muslims and if they will be punished for not belonging to the right religion. An often-recited Quranic verse implies that righteous non-Muslims will be saved on Judgement Day:

Indeed, those who believed and those who were Jews or Christians or Sabians—those who believed in Allah and the Last Day and did righteousness—will have their reward with their Lord, and no fear will there be concerning them, nor will they grieve. 2:62

However some scholars hold this verse may be set aside as only applying before the arrival of Muhammad, as there "exists a strong exegetical tradition" that claims that verse and others suggesting non-Muslims may be saved, were abrogated by a later verse indicating a much less pleasant hereafter:

"... .whoever desires a religion other than Islam, it shall not be accepted from him, and in the hereafter he shall be one of the losers." (Q.3:85)

According to many scholars who interpret verses that state "dwell therein unless thy Lord will it otherwise" eternality of hell is only depend on God's vast mercy. Jafar al Sadiq, the grandson of Muhammad, asserted the people who remain hell are only those who are so full of corruption that they have literally put themselves here and are sinners with so vast sins that it corrupted their being and that majority of people will be released either by mercy or purification. Some non-pluralist scholars like Ibn Arabi state that every human will receive a proper message and will not be doomed for ignorance, while others claim non-Muslims are judged by their own moral standards, because of God's all-embracing mercy. According to a hadith, there would be many cases where God mercy would free people from fire.

Another criterion to determine the justice of Hell's punishment derives from its duration, on which Islamic scholars disagree. The orthodox view holds that Hell is eternal, others hold that Hell exists to purify rather than inflict pain, and may even cease to exist after a while.

With the increasing urgency of pluralism, modern writers such as Edip Yüksel and Mouhanad Khorchide hold Hell to be finite rather than eternal: Yüksel argues that evildoers will be punished in Hell for an appropriate period then cease to exist, so that their suffering (which is described in the Quran and is balanced with descriptions of heaven) will be only a just amount.

=== Concerning predestination ===
Approximately 87–90% of Muslims are Sunni, and one of six articles of faith in Sunni Islam is belief in the existence of God's predestination due to God's omniscience, whether it involves good or bad. Based on Sunni traditions, God wrote everything that will happen (in all of his creation) on a tablet before creating the world. Thus it is asked: how can humans be punished for what God has determined they do? In this tradition, in Ashari thought, God created good and evil deeds, which humans decide upon—humans have their own possibility to choose, but God retains sovereignty of all possibilities. This still leaves the question of why God set out those people's lives (or the negative choice of deeds) which result in Hell, and why God made it possible to become evil. In Islamic thought, evil is considered to be movement away from good, and God created this possibility so that humans are able to recognize good. In contrast, angels are unable to move away from good, therefore angels generally rank lower than humans as they have reached heaven because they lack the ability to perceive the world as humans do.

== Proposed answers ==
=== Annihilationism ===
As with other Jewish writings of the Second Temple period, the New Testament text distinguishes two words, both translated "Hell" in older English Bibles: Hades, "the grave", and Gehenna where God "can destroy both body and soul". A minority of Christians read this to mean that neither Hades nor Gehenna are eternal but refer to the ultimate destruction of the wicked in the Lake of Fire in a consuming fire, but which because of the Greek words used in translating from the Hebrew text has become confused with Greek myths and ideas. From the sixth century BC onward, the Greeks developed pagan ideas for the dead, and of reincarnation and even transmigration of souls. Christians picked up these pagan beliefs inferred by the Greek of immortality of the soul, or spirit being of a mortal individual, which survives the death of the body of this world and this lifetime, which is at odds and in contrast to the scriptural teaching that the dead go to the grave and know nothing and then at the end, an eternal oblivion of the wicked and an eternal life for the saints. Scripture makes clear that the dead are awaiting resurrection at the last judgment, when Christ comes and also when each person will receive his reward or are part of those lost with the wicked.

The Greek words used for those Bibles written in Greek, came loaded with ideas not in line with the original Hebrew, but since at the time, Greek was used as basically English is used today to communicate between people across the world, it was translated into these Greek words, and giving an incorrect understanding of the penalty of sin. In the Hebrew text when people died they went to Sheol, the grave and the wicked ultimately went to Gehenna which is the consuming by fire. So when the grave or the eternal oblivion of the wicked was translated into Greek, the word Hades was sometimes used, which is a Greek term for the realm of the dead. Nevertheless, the meaning depending on context was the grave, death, or the end of the wicked in which they are ultimately destroyed or perish. So we see where the grave or death or eventual destruction of the wicked, was translated using Greek words that since they had no exact ones to use, became a mix of mistranslation, pagan influence, and Greek myth associated with the word, but its original meaning was simple death or the destruction of the wicked at the end.

Christian mortalism is the doctrine that all men and women, including Christians, must die, and do not continue and are not conscious after death. Therefore, annihilationism includes the doctrine that "the wicked" are also destroyed rather than tormented forever in traditional "Hell" or the lake of fire. Christian mortalism and annihilationism are directly related to the doctrine of conditional immortality, the idea that a human soul is not immortal unless it is given eternal life at the Second Coming of Christ and the resurrection of the dead. Such a belief is based on the many texts which state that the wicked perish:

"For God so loved the world, that he gave his only begotten Son, that whosoever believeth in him should not perish, but have everlasting life." John 3:16 (KJV).
"For the day of the Lord is near upon all the heathen: as thou hast done, it shall be done unto thee: thy reward shall return upon thine own head. For as ye have drunk upon my holy mountain, so shall all the heathen drink continually, yea, they shall drink, and they shall swallow down, and they shall be as though they had not been." Obadiah 1:15–16 (KJV).

Annihilationism asserts that God will eventually destroy or annihilate the wicked when they are consumed in the Lake of Fire at the end, leaving only the righteous to live on in immortality. Conditional immortality asserts that souls are naturally mortal, and those who reject Christ are separated from the sustaining power of God, thus dying off on their own.

This is seen in the texts making clear the alternatives at the end are to perish or to have eternal, everlasting life:

"For the wages of sin is death, but the gift of God is eternal life in Christ Jesus our Lord." Romans 6:23 (KJV)

And that the consequence for sin at the day of judgment when God will judge both the living and the dead when He appears is death, not burning forever. God's gift is eternal life, different from the penalty of sin:

"The Lord knoweth how to deliver the godly out of temptations, and to reserve the unjust unto the day of judgment to be punished." 2 Peter 2:9. (KJV).
"As therefore the tares are gathered and burned in the fire; so shall it be in the end of this world." Matthew 13:40 (KJV).
"So shall it be at the end of the world: the angels shall come forth, and sever the wicked from among the just, And shall cast them into the furnace of fire: there shall be wailing and gnashing of teeth." Matthew 13:49–50 (KJV).

The mortality of the soul has been held throughout the history of both Judaism and Christianity, with multiple biblical scholars looking at the issue through the Hebrew text, have denied the teaching of innate immortality. Rejection of the immortality of the soul, and advocacy of Christian mortalism, was a feature of Protestantism since the early days of the Reformation with Martin Luther himself rejecting the traditional idea, though his view did not carry into orthodox Lutheranism. One of the most notable English opponents of the immortality of the soul was Thomas Hobbes who describes the idea as a Greek "contagion" in Christian doctrine. Modern proponents of conditional immortality include as denominations the Seventh-day Adventists, Bible Students, Jehovah's Witnesses, Christadelphians, and some other Protestant Christians.

=== Free will ===
Some apologists argue that Hell exists because of free will, and that Hell is a choice rather than an imposed punishment. Jonathan L. Kvanvig writes:

[C.S.] Lewis believes that the doors of hell are locked from the inside rather than from the outside. Thus, according to Lewis, if escape from hell never happens, it is not because God is not willing that it should happen. Instead, residence in hell is eternal because that is just what persons in hell have chosen for themselves.

Similarly, Dave Hunt (1996) writes:

We may rest assured that no one will suffer in hell who could by any means have been won to Christ in this life. God leaves no stone unturned to rescue all who would respond to the convicting and wooing of the Holy Spirit.

Popular culture, for instance, the graphic novel series The Sandman, sometimes proposes the idea that souls go to Hell because they believe that they deserve to, rather than being condemned to it by God or Satan.

=== Universal reconciliation ===
Universal reconciliation is the doctrine or belief of some Christians that all will eventually receive salvation because of the love and mercy of God. Universal reconciliation does not commit one to the position that one can be saved apart from Christ. It only commits one to the position that all will eventually be saved through Christ. Neither does universal reconciliation commit one to the position that there is no Hell or damnation—Hell can well be the consuming fire through which Christ refines those who turn from him (Matthew 3:11). Universal reconciliation only claims that one day Death and Hades themselves will be destroyed and all immortal souls will be reconciled to Him.

It was traditionally claimed by some western scholars such as the Universalist historian George T. Knight (1911) and Pierre Batiffol (English translation 1914) that a form of universal salvation could be found among some theologians in early Christianity. Origen interpreted the New Testament's reference (Acts 3:21) to a "restoration of all things", (Greek: apocatastasis of all things), as meaning that sinners might be restored to God and released from Hell, returning the universe to a state identical to its pure beginnings. This theory of apocatastasis could be easily interpreted to imply that even devils would be saved, as was the case during the later Origenist controversies. Some Greek Orthodox scholars do not count Gregory of Nyssa (AD 331–395) as a believer in Universal Salvation, although some do, given that multiple passages in his writings appear to explicitly affirm apocatastasis.

In the 17th century, a belief in Christian universalism appeared in England and traveled over to what has become the present-day US Christian Universalists such as Hosea Ballou argued that Jesus taught Universalist principles including universal reconciliation and the divine origin and destiny of all souls. Ballou also argued that some Universalist principles were taught or foreshadowed in the Old Testament. Critics of universalism maintain that the Bible does not teach universal salvation, while proponents insist that it does.

Recent examples of advocates for the position are Kallistos Ware, a Greek Orthodox bishop and retired University of Oxford theologian who states that some of the 'Fathers of Church' postulated the idea of salvation for all, and Saint Silouan of Mount Athos, who argued that the compassion and love of those in heaven and on earth will extend to eliminating suffering even in hell. In terms of Biblical citations, Father David A. Fisher, Pastor of St. Anthony of Padua Maronite Church and professor of philosophy at Ohio Central State University, has argued that total reconciliation seems to arise from the First Epistle to the Corinthians such as 1 Corinthians 15:22, "As all die in Adam, so all will be made alive in Christ", and 1 Corinthians 15:28, "God will be all in all." Verses that seem to contradict the tradition of complete damnation and come up in arguments also include Lamentations 3:31–33 (NIV), "For no one is cast off by the Lord forever. Though he brings grief, he will show compassion, so great is his unfailing love, For he does not willingly bring affliction or grief to anyone.", 1 Timothy 4:10 (NIV), "We have put our hope in the living God, who is the Savior of all people, and especially of those who believe.", and Luke 3:6, "And all people will see God’s salvation."

=== Theodicy ===
With regards to the problem of hell, as one that can be traced to the more fundamental theological dilemma of God and the existence of good and evil, theodicy offers its own answers. The main issue holds that if God is all good, powerful, and perfect, then how can he allow evil and, by extension, hell to exist? For some thinkers, the existence of evil and hell could mean that God is not perfectly good and powerful or that there is no God at all. Theodicy tries to address this dilemma by reconciling an all-knowing, all-powerful, and omnibenevolent God with the existence of evil and suffering, outlining the possibility that God and evil can coexist. There are several thoughts or theodicies such as biblical theodicy, the theodicy attributed to Gottfried Leibniz, Plotinian, Irenean, and Augustinian, among others. These differ in their respective arguments but, overall, these theodicies—as opposed to a defense that demonstrates the existence of God and evil or hell—seek to demonstrate a framework where God's existence is plausible. It is, therefore, a logical instead of evidential answer to the problem. A theodicy explains God's reason for allowing evil, that there is a greater good that justifies such permission.

== Empty hell theory ==
Some Catholic theologians prominent around the time of the Second Vatican Council, such as Karl Rahner, Gisbert Greshake, and Cardinal Hans Urs von Balthasar have at length discussed the possibility that any man may be led by a final grace to freely willed repentance if necessary at least at some point in the process of dying. This possible process is described thus by German dogmatic theologian Michael Schmaus:

If in terms of theology death is a meeting of a man with God in so far as God calls man and he answers obedience, readiness and love, it would be surprising if in the moment of dying the chances of taking position never were given, even contrary to the outward look. ... One cannot apply to experience as counter-argument, because ... what happens then in the interior and behind the physiological processes is only known by someone who experiences dying itself, and this unto its very end. We may assume that in the dissolving process of the earthly union of body and soul and with the progressing breakaway from earthly entanglements, a special awakeness accrues to man ... in which he can say yea or nay to God.

Balthasar was careful to describe his opinion that hell might be empty as merely a hope, but even this claim was rejected by most conservative Catholics, including Cardinal Avery Dulles. The Syllabus says in no. 17 that we may not (even) hope for the salvation of all non-Catholics; this seems to mean conversely that there is at least one non-Catholic in all history who will not be saved. Matthew 7:21–23 seems to say that "many" will be reproved, which may imply hell (not some lesser purgatory). On the other hand, error no. 17 in question only speaks of those "in the true Church of Christ", which need not imply the visible Church. Catholicism not only allows for the possibility that non-Catholics can be saved, but even rejected the view known as Feeneyism, which held that only people in visible communion with the Catholic Church could be saved.

== See also ==
- Aeon
- Cruel and unusual punishment
- Degrees of glory
- Dystheism
- Eschatology
- Ethics of torture
- Fall of man
- Limbo
- Misotheism
- Predestination
- Purgatory
- Retributive justice
- Torture
