= L. F. W. Andrews =

American Universalist minister and newspaper publisher (1802–1875)

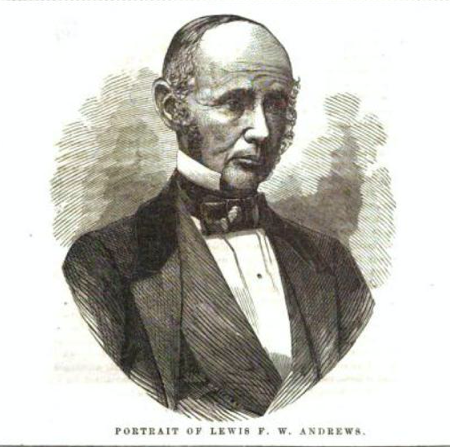
- Born: September 2, 1802; North Carolina, US
- Died: March 16, 1875 (aged 72); Americus, Georgia, US
- Occupations: Minister, Publisher
- Known for: Universalist Ministry, Publisher of denominational and secular newspapers
- Notable work: The Two Opinions, or Salvation and Damnation, being an inquiry into the truth of certain theological tenets – 1838
- Religion: Universalism

Lewis Feuilleteau Wilson Andrews (September 2, 1802 – March 16, 1875) was an American Southern Universalist minister and a prodigious publisher of denominational and secular newspapers. He was among a handful of Northern Universalist ministers who came to the American South in the early 1800s to assist in the spread of Universalism.

== Early life ==
Andrews was born on September 7, 1802, to Rev. John Andrews, a Presbyterian minister, and Elizabeth Calhoun (1776–1844) in North Carolina. In an 1858 biography, Andrews stated that he had seven brothers, however, only four of those brothers have been identified: John Calhoun, Samuel, Benjamin, and Alexander. L.F.W. Andrews grew up in a family committed to the Presbyterian ministry and the publication of denominational newspapers.

The senior Andrews began his lifetime ministerial work serving the Brittain Presbyterian Church in Rutherfordton, North Carolina from 1788 to 1800. In 1802, John Andrews moved to Kentucky, where he was the Woodford County Bethel Church's pastor and the principal of the church's private classical academy. He married Elizabeth Calhoun in 1797.

In 1812, John Andrews moved his family to Chillicothe, Ohio where he embarked on a long newspaper publishing career. In 1814, he published his first periodical, The Weekly Recorder. The paper's mission was to convey "every kind of useful intelligence, to diffuse evangelical and moral truth" on matters of theology, literature, and national affairs. Two of his sons were occasionally engaged in the operation of the paper. From 1819 to 1820, John Andrews partnered with his son, John Calhoun, to publish the paper. In 1820, L.F.W. Andrews, called Lewis by his father, was an agent collecting payments for the paper while attending college in Canonsburg, Pennsylvania.

In Chillicothe, the Andrews family experienced a tragedy when Samuel, L.F.W. Andrews's brother, drowned in an accident in 1820. A year later, The Weekly Recorder ceased operation due to mounting financial pressure. Soon after that, Andrews moved his family to Pittsburgh, Pennsylvania.

The senior Andrews arrived in Pittsburgh without any expectation of publishing a newspaper again, but at the urging of the Presbyterian Synod of Pittsburgh, he resumed editing a newspaper. On January 25, 1822, he issued the first copy of a weekly newspaper, The Pittsburgh Recorder, devoted "to the great interests of evangelical truth and piety." Andrews continued The Pittsburgh Recorder until December 1827.

In January 1828, he began publishing another paper, The Spectator, with a similar objective to his other papers. He remained the editor of The Spectator for only one year. The senior Andrews, "wishing to retire," transferred ownership to Samuel C. Jennings in November 1828. Jennings, who also had the support of the Presbyterian Synod of Pittsburgh, issued his newspaper under the name the Christian Herald.

At about the same time the senior Andrews was leaving the publishing field, his son, L.F.W. Andrews, began his own publication of the short-lived Masonic Souvenir and Pittsburgh Literary Gazette in June 1828. The paper was a joint effort between the younger Andrews and B. Hutchinson and was devoted to freemasonry, literature, science, and the arts. The paper ceased publication six months later in December due to a lack of subscribers. Andrews, however, continued his lifetime affiliation with Freemasonry.

== Education ==
Andrews began his formal education in 1809 at the Bethel Church Academy in Kentucky, run by his father. When his family moved to Ohio, he became an apprentice in his father's publishing business and continued his formal education at the Male Seminary of Chillicothe.

Due to his father's urging that his son follow him into the Presbyterian ministry, Andrews enrolled at Jefferson College in Canonsburg, Pennsylvania, 25 miles south of Pittsburgh.

The college, founded by John McMillian (1752–1833), a prominent Presbyterian, offered a classical education, including mathematics, grammar, rhetoric, natural history, Greek, and Latin, which prepared young men for the ministry. In 1821, Andrews completed his studies, earning a Bachelor of Arts.

After graduation, Andrews returned home and continued his education, reading history and literature and awaiting a spiritual illumination that would signal his readiness to begin his Presbyterian ministry. After two years, Andrews experienced no spiritual awakening. With the consent of his parents, he then pursued legal studies at the law office of John Hopkins, a distinguished Pittsburgh attorney. Andrews was soon unsettled by the legal profession's ability to expose the darker side of human nature. After three months, he abandoned those studies and came under the tutelage of Dr. James Agnew, a noted physician. Andrews pursued further studies at Transylvania University in Lexington, Kentucky, graduating in 1825 with a medical degree.

Andrews then practiced medicine in Cleveland, Ohio and Pittsburgh, Pennsylvania. He and another physician, Dr. Israel Town, were also proprietors of drug stores. The physicians advertised they would provide professional services at no charge if their patients purchased their prescriptions from their stores.

== Marriage and Children ==
In 1827, two years after graduating from medical school, Andrews, 25, married Jane Gray, who was 17. They had eight children.

- Mary Elizabeth (1829-1848) married William Griswold, who worked at Andrews's Muscogee Democrat in Columbus, Georgia. Within a year of the marriage, she died.
- Caroline Matilda (1832-1856), at age 17, also married William Griswold in 1849. Seven years later, she died in Georgia in 1856.
- Lewis Holcomb (1835-1913) served in the Confederate Army in the American Civil War and was mustered out of the service following the surrender of the Confederate Army at Appomattox Court House, Virginia. Later, his father would transfer control of his publishing operations to his son. He married Alice Baynham Royston who died in 1874. Remarried Ann Winston Butler in 1877. He died in Richmond, Virginia.
- Helen Jane (1838-1901) appears to have never married. Studied at Wesleyan Female College in Macon and later ran a primary school in Macon. Moved to and later died in Washington, DC in 1901.
- John Calhoun (1841-1864) also served in the Confederate Army in the American Civil War and was killed in action in October 1864.
- Jane (Jennie) Grey (1843-1895) married Charles Ross in 1866. Lived and died in Macon.
- Fannie Alice (1845-1937) appears to have never married and died at the Home of Incurables in Washington, DC.
- Ella (also Ollie) L. (1849-DoD) appears to have never married. She may have been a teacher.

Following the death of his first wife, Andrews married Mary Elizabeth (née) Smith (1829–1878) in 1867. Smith had been widowed four years earlier following the death of her first husband, Thomas Cato Lamar. This marriage produced only one child.

- Lee Lamar (1868-DoD) married in 1893 and moved to New Jersey and New York.

== Early Universalist Ministry and Denomination Newspapers ==
Six years after graduating from medical school, Andrews abandoned his medical career and, like his father, turned to ministry. However, instead of preaching the religion of his youth, Presbyterianism, he turned to Universalism.

=== Embracing Universalism ===
An explanation of Andrews's conversion appeared in his 1876 obituary published in the Universalist Register. This "conversion story" tells of a chance encounter in 1830 with the veteran Universalist preacher, Rev. J.C. Waldo. Andrews allegedly challenged Waldo to preach on Matthew 25:32, where God separates the sheep and goats to those to be saved and those to be condemned. Andrews's challenge, the obituary explained, was to "scoff" at Waldo's Universalist interpretation. Instead, common to many conversion stories, Waldo's sermon so moved Andrews that he scorned his orthodox beliefs on endless punishment and embraced the eventual happiness of all souls.

Although this conversion story contains some relevant information, it portrays an inaccurate accounting and suffers from crucial omissions. In 1858, Andrews recounted his conversion to Universalism. Understanding his religious background is the first omission to be corrected. He was raised in the conservative orthodoxy of the Presbyterian church: old-fashioned Presbyterian theology, as Andrews described it. That theology drew from the Calvinist tenets of pre-destination, the election of those to be saved and those to be condemned. Andrews could no longer accept this belief of his upbringing. He rejected the idea of endless torment for himself and others. Although Presbyterian by birth and education, he found himself an infidel within his childhood faith. For years, he struggled with this internal conflict until, as he observed, "providentially," he had his chance encounter with Rev. Waldo in Augusta, Kentucky. Andrews did not come to "scoff," but to seek affirmation of the doctrine of the "restitution of all things."

== Letters between Father and Son ==
In May 1831, Andrews and his father exchanged letters regarding Andrews's embrace of Universalism. The letters revealed a poignant effort by a father to save his son from what he thought was a "labyrinth of destructive error." Fatherly concern was expressed when the senior Andrews wrote:

I believe your present standing is inconceivably serious and critical. I humbly hope you are not confirmed in the sentiments which you have avowed that you are yet open to conviction and will not rest without more diligent and more preferable inquiry after truth.

As a Calvinist Presbyterian minister, his father also admonished his son.

If you become a preacher of Unitarianism and Universalism, you will be accountable for all the injury you may do to your hearers, and if they should perish through your instrumentality, let it be deeply impressed upon your mind, that their blood will be required at your hand!

The resolve of the young Andrews was equally evident, as he tossed aside the previous beliefs of his youth in the Trinity, original sin, the total depravity of humankind, and a sovereign God's predestination of souls, some to everlasting bliss and others to eternal damnation. L.F.W. questioned the sovereign power of this God.

If God is a wise and good being, and had he not a good design in creation? If so and he is almighty in power, can his design be thwarted? Would not this be the case of a mighty devil has succeeded in wrestling from Jehovah a large part of his creatures?

The young Andrews then raised this final point on the intent and power of God.

The matter stands thus: God can save all men, but will not, or he will save all men, but cannot, or he can and will save all men.

The implication of the observation would not have been lost on his father. A God that "can save all men but will not" is the Presbyterian Calvinist God of his father. The God that "will save all men but cannot" is the God of the Arminians. The God that can "save all men" and "will save all men" is the God of Universalism.

=== Ordination ===
Fellow Universalists quickly embraced Andrews. The June 1831 Cincinnati convention of the Western Union Association of Universalists ordained him as a Universalist minister. His upbringing by a minister and his ministerial education at Jefferson College most likely supported the decision to grant him a letter of ordination without additional training.

Andrews approached his new calling as a Universalist minister with frenetic zeal. Now living in Hartford, Connecticut, he went on a preaching tour in New Hampshire, Massachusetts, and Connecticut, with several of his sermons printed in denominational newspapers.

=== Religious Inquirer ===
Within eight months of his ordination, Andrews returned to an endeavor formed in his youth, the newspaper business. Though trained as a minister, one could make an argument that newspaper publishing was Andrews' true calling, as, over his lifetime, he would edit or own more than a dozen newspapers.

In February 1832, Binea Sperry, the new owner of the Religious Inquirer, headquartered in Hartford, appointed Andrews as the head of the paper's editorial department, a prestigious appointment from a respected Universalist paper that began publication in 1821. Rev. Menzies Rayner, the outgoing editor, endorsed the appointment, stating, "Though he has not been a member of our communion long, Dr. A. is very favorably known to the Universalist public, as a gentleman of talents and a minister sound in faith." However, Andrews left his position within ten weeks, citing "pecuniary considerations."

=== Gospel Witness ===
In July 1832, three months after his departure from the Religious Inquirer, Andrews was again engaged in the newspaper business with his own paper named the Gospel Witness. Also published in Hartford, the influential editor of the Boston-based Trumpet and Universalist Magazine, Thomas Whittemore, cast dispersions on Andrews's paper, questioning the "public good" of publishing a second paper alongside the Religious Inquirer in Hartford.

Whether due to the headwinds created by Whittemore or other obstacles Andrews encountered, within three months, he abandoned his plans to publish the Gospel Witness as a standalone paper. Rather, the Gospel Witness would become a jointly published paper with The Herald of Freedom, a Universalist-leaning paper owned by P.T. Barnum before his career as a showman. Barnum, serving a 60-day prison term on his conviction on a libel charge, requested Andrews's assistance with his paper. The Herald of Freedom and Gospel Witness, published in Bethel, Connecticut, continued as a joint paper until the paper moved to Danbury, Connecticut in 1833.

=== Preaching ===
Andrews did not retreat from preaching while engaged or between his publishing efforts. He served the Glastonbury, Connecticut society as a quarter-time minister. At the 1832 Southern Association of Universalists convention held in Stafford, Connecticut, he accepted an appointment to the Association's committee on Fellowship and Ordination. Later in 1832, he attended the convention of the Philadelphia Association of Universalists held in Hightstown, New Jersey. His attendance at this convention may have been his bid to secure his first Universalist pastorate.

=== Second Universalist Church of Philadelphia ===
In November 1832, Andrews was invited to become the pastor of the Callowhill Street Universalist Church in Philadelphia, Pennsylvania. Organized just ten years earlier, the Callowhill Street Church was one of two Universalist churches in the city. The other, located on Lombard Street, was served by Rev. Abel C. Thomas.

In March 1833, Andrews commented on the vitality of his church: "I delivered an address to the Young Men, and though the whole lower floor of the church was reserved from them, hundreds went away for want of a room."

Andrews remained at the Callowhill Street Church for about a year. In October 1833, he resigned from his pastorate, intending to preach in Augusta, Georgia. This move south was neither unexpected nor unprecedented. Before accepting the Callowhill Street Church pastorate, Andrews had announced that he had hoped to spend the fall and winter of 1832 preaching in Georgia and South Carolina. Three years earlier, in 1830, Rev. Allen Fuller, a Massachusetts minister, moved to South Carolina in response to a call from the newly constituted South Carolina Universalist State Convention for "brethren in the Northern States" to relocate to the South and aid in the spread of Universalism. From 1830 to 1861, the South would witness a significant expansion of Universalism. Andrews would be involved in that expansion as a minister and publisher.

== Early Years in the South ==
There was no indication that Andrews planned to settle in Augusta, Georgia, permanently. In fact, he departed just two months later in December 1833. There is speculation that the city's few Universalists had invited Andrews in the hopes of establishing a Universalist society or a joint society with the city's Unitarians. A Unitarian church had been organized in the city in 1827 with Rev. Stephen Bulfinch serving as minister during Andrews's visit. Andrews preached in Bulfinch's church. Upon his departure, Andrews observed that the prospects of forming a Universalist society in the city were "at present weak." He offered comfort that the city Universalists did have the "ministrations of a very amiable young man of the Unitarian order."

=== Montgomery, Alabama ===
Andrews moved to Montgomery in 1833 based on an invitation to provide his preaching services for one year. The invitation included the added incentives that a new church was about to be built and that the townspeople "are able and willing to support stated preaching all the time." (italics in original text).

Montgomery was very much a frontier town. Alabama had been formed only 19 years earlier from lands ceded by the Muscogee (Creek) Nation under the terms of the 1814 Treaty of Fort Jackson. The Creek Nation had recently ceded additional lands in 1832 under the terms of the Treaty of Cusseta, from which the eastern counties of Alabama would be formed. The city of Montgomery was incorporated just 14 years prior to Andrews' arrival.

The state of Southern Universalism was even more in its infancy. South Carolina was the only Southern state with a Universalist State Convention, an organizational structure that provided Universalists a mechanism to ordain preachers, recruit circuit riders, and offer a sense of community to scattered rural societies.

==== Universalist Societies ====
Andrews's arrival in Montgomery coincided with the dedication of two Universalist societies. One was the society in Montgomery that had invited Andrews to serve as its pastor. The other was a rural grassroots effort led by Willis Atkins on his plantation north of Montgomery at Mt. Olympus. Andrews would participate in both dedications.

The effort led by Atkins was the first to be dedicated on June 1, 1834. Atkins had come to Universalism by reading Universalist tracts. Elders of his Methodist Episcopal church grew suspicious and accused Atkins of "holding and disseminating a false and dangerous doctrine." Consequently, he was expelled and barred from entering the church's meetinghouse. Atkins, undeterred in his new faith, began to preach the message of a saving God in the surrounding area. Regarding his being barred from the church meetinghouse, as a wealthy plantation owner, he simply built his own meetinghouse, the first Universalist meetinghouse in Alabama.

At the dedication of Atkins's meetinghouse, known as the Universalist Society of Mt. Olympus, were Andrews and Atkins. Following his ordination in November, conducted by Andrews and Fuller from South Carolina, Atkins assumed the pastorate of this new society.

Three weeks later, Andrews's meetinghouse in Montgomery was dedicated. Located at the east end of a square fronting Perry Street, between Alabama and South Alabama Streets, the new Universalist society was chartered as the Unitarian Universalist Society of Montgomery on June 22, 1834. The chartering document indicated it was committed to "unrestricted liberty of conscience and the right of private judgment in matters of faith and duty."

There are limited instances where Unitarians and Universalists, both small liberal denominations, joined for a common cause. However, there is a scant reference in the historic denominational records or contemporary newspapers of the Unitarian Universalist Society of Montgomery. The Montgomery Universalist presence in the city was most frequently called the Universalist Chapel.

Andrews remained the pastor of this new society until he resigned in November 1835 and moved to assume the pastorate of the Charleston, South Carolina Universalist Society.

==== Southern Evangelist - Montgomery ====
While in Montgomery, Andrews returned to his newspaper publishing roots. He published the first edition of his paper, The Southern Evangelist, in May 1834. Over the years, the paper would be published in various locations, the name would change, and the ownership and participants would rotate through several people. What is significant is that the newspaper was a Southern organ. Of the Universalist papers in circulation in the South, the Trumpet and Universalist Magazine (Boston, MA), Religious Inquirer (Hartford, CT), Southern Pioneer and Gospel Visiter (SIC) (Baltimore, MD), and other periodicals were all published in the North by Northern proprietors and editors.

There were earlier attempts to publish a Southern newspaper, but none were organically Southern-grown. In 1825 Michael (sometimes Mischael) Smith published the Star of the South in Milledgeville, Georgia. However, the paper was not strictly speaking a Southern journal. It was printed in Hartford, Connecticut, and its content was a reprint of the Religious Inquirer augmented with an editorial department devoted to news of the South. It ceased publication in 1827. Similarly, Rev. Jacob Frieze, a New England Universalist minister who temporarily moved to North Carolina, published in 1826 the short-lived paper, The Liberalist.

Andrews proclaimed that his Southern Evangelist was an "advocate of the pure morality which is founded upon the principle of love to God, instead of fear of the Devil." The motto that appeared in the masthead, inspired by 1 Thessalonians 5:8, was "Do the work of an Evangelist – Putting on the Breastplate of Faith and Love and for a Helmet, the Hope of Salvation."

Andrews continued in his augural edition, "We pretend not to be infallible... but we claim the right of private judgment, and the right of investigating the pretensions of all human systems." Andrews also opened his paper to criticism of his chosen faith. "A reasonable space will be allowed. . .to any opponent, if couched in courteous and decent phraseology."

After Andrews left Montgomery for Charleston, South Carolina, he relocated the publishing of the Southern Evangelist to that city.

=== Charleston, South Carolina ===
In June 1835, several months before he resigned his pastorate in Montgomery, Andrews made a trip North where he conferred with fellow Universalist publishers and again attended the convention of the Philadelphia Association of Universalists and the U.S. General Convention of Universalists in New York. To secure northbound east coast sea passage, Andrews again visited Charleston, as he did on his southbound travels to Montgomery. It is speculated that during his second visit to Charleston, efforts were made to recruit Andrews to fill the empty pulpit of Charleston's Universalist church.

==== First Universalist Society of Charleston ====
In announcing his acceptance to become the pastor of the First Universalist Society in Charleston, Andrews noted the "repeated requests" by the Charleston society for him to become its pastor. Charleston's Universalists undoubtedly shared their intentions to build a new church.

Charleston, unlike Montgomery, had a history of Universalism. There were initial efforts as early as 1824 to form a Universalist society. The city's Universalists, fearful of a social backlash due to the prevailing view that Universalism was "heretical," formed a private association of only three members. Three years later, In December 1827, the city's Universalists shed their earlier reluctance and organized the Association of Universalists of Charleston.

In 1830, Rev. Paul Dean, a prominent minister from New England, provided public services at the officially chartered First Universalist Society. Dean preached for only five weeks. He was followed by Rev. Lemuel Willis, another New England minister. The pulpit then remained mainly empty until Andrews filled it.

During his pastorate, a church building was erected in 1836 at the corner of Anson and Laurens Streets. Andrews, however, remained in the pulpit only a short time, resigning in 1836.

Other ministers followed, such as Theophilus Fisk, who preached the dedication sermon for the new building, John Gregory, Jerome Harris, Albert Case, and M.B. Newell. However, the fate of Charleston's Universalists was sealed with the sale of the church property in 1856.

==== Southern Evangelist - Charleston ====
As promised, Andrews resumed publication of the Southern Evangelist in Charleston in January 1835. He was now aided by a team of associate editors of fellow Southern Universalist ministers, Rev. Allen Fuller, Rev. S.J. McMorris, and Rev. H.F. Stearns. Stearns, a Vermont minister, moved South to replace Andrews in Montgomery.

When Andrews left Charleston, he sold his interest in the Southern Universalist. Theophilus Fisk became the editor, assisted only by McMorris and Stearns.

=== Baltimore, Maryland ===
==== Southern Pioneer and Evangelical Liberalist ====
Andrews abruptly departed Charleston in 1836 and settled in Baltimore, Maryland. There, he briefly became the proprietor of the Southern Pioneer and Evangelical Liberalist. Rev. Otis. A. Skinner, a Vermont Universalist who moved to Maryland, launched the paper in 1831 but relinquished ownership four years later when he returned North. During Skinner's control, the paper absorbed other papers and changed names and editors. When Andrews acquired the journal, Rev. Linus S. Everett was the owner and editor. Like Skinner before him, Everett was both editor and pastor of the city's Universalist church but found both positions too demanding. He sold the paper to Andrews.

Andrews's management of the paper was disastrous. Without informing Everett, who remained an editor, Andrews formed a partnership with George C. McCune, a Virginia Universalist minister, and Robert Smith, a disfellowed former Universalist minister. The partnership went bankrupt and dissolved.

Andrews's tenure at the Southern Pioneer was also marred by increasing antagonism between Northern denominational publishers, who dominated the distribution of Universalist newspapers, and a small but vocal group of Southern publishers on the issue of abolition.

Northern Universalists, seeing the divisive effects that the slavery debate had on other denominations, generally remained cautious, only observing that slavery was inconsistent with the denomination's idea of an "all-inclusive human family."

Hoping to preserve peace within the denomination, Northern and Southern Universalists maintained this cautious status quo. However, Southern Universalist editors sought a more public affirmation of the denomination's position, often accusing Northern editors of being abolitionists, knowing a denial would be issued quickly.

While at the helm of the Southern Pioneer, Andrews raised the ire of many Northern publishers when he leveled an accusation of abolitionism against his own co-editor. Everett was then required to issue the obligatory disclaimer that he was "not an Abolitionist."

== Renewed Southern Ministry and Denominational Newspapers ==
Following his short stay in Baltimore, Andrews returned to the South in 1837, where he lived primarily in Georgia in Macon, Columbus, and Americus and briefly in South Carolina.

=== Macon, Georgia ===
==== Universalist Society of Macon ====
It is reasoned that Andrews settled in Macon to be part of the city's emerging Universalist society. In February 1838, he was one of three individuals who petitioned the Macon town council for an acre of land for the Universalist Society of Macon. Andrews was also a signer of a stock subscription plan to raise $17,500 for the church's construction.

==== Evangelical Universalist ====
Consistent with his move to other cities, Andrews published a Universalist denominational newspaper in Macon. In 1838, he released his new paper, the Southern Evangelist and Evangelical Review. That paper quickly changed its name to the Evangelical Universalist when it merged with Andrews's old newspaper, the Southern Evangelist, which had continued to be published in Charleston by Rev. John Gregory and C. A. Hall. Andrews, Gregory, and Hall became the proprietors of the new Evangelical Universalist paper, with Andrews and Gregory as editors and Philo Brownson as associate editor.

Andrews also continued his attacks on the alleged abolitionist leanings of Northern Universalist publishers in the pages of the Evangelical Universalist. Andrews focused particular attention on Rev. Sylvanus Cobb, a Massachusetts Universalist and publisher of the Christian Freeman and Family Visiter (SIC). Andrews wrote that he was "deeply mortified" that Cobb would advance a paper devoted to the "cause of Abolition" that would bring division within the denomination. "We had indulged the hope that the ample discord—ABOLITION— which had so distracted the Methodist, Presbyterian, and other denominations at the North, would never have been introduced into our connexion."

Undeterred, Cobb went on to be instrumental in moving the denomination to officially condemn slavery in 1843.

=== Organization of Universalists ===
Andrews's pastorate at the Macon church coincided with a time of growth of Universalism in Georgia. Just four years earlier, in 1834, the first Universalist meetinghouse in Georgia was dedicated in Mulberry Grove, Harris County. Other Universalist meetinghouses soon followed in Zebulon, Pike County, Monroe, Walton County, and Green Hill, Jones County. Georgia, however, lacked any regional or statewide organizational structure to coordinate activities or ordain ministers.

While in Montgomery, Andrews suggested that the 1834 dedication ceremony of Mulberry Grove include a discussion on creating a regional organizational structure he called the Southern Evangelical Association. He envisioned an Association composed of Universalist societies in the Georgia and Alabama counties in proximity to the Chattahoochee River. No action was taken, and Andrews's departure to Charleston rendered further discussion moot. Now, back in Georgia, Andrews used the pages of the Evangelical Universalist to advocate for the formation of such a structure again.

At a May 1838 meeting in Flint River, Georgia, attended by Andrews, ostensibly to aid local Houston and Macon County Universalists, steps were set into motion to realize Andrews's vision of an organizational structure. Two months later, at a meeting of Universalists in Mulberry Grove, a resolution passed that called for

The brethren in Harris, Talbot, Muscogee, Chambers, Russel (SIC) and Troup Counties and Coweta, Merriwether (SIC) form themselves into an Association to be known as the "Chattahoochee Association."

There was now momentum to organize the scattering of Universalist societies. Independently, Universalists in the northern counties of Georgia announced, in September 1838, the formation of the Northern Association of Universalists. Georgia Universalists would merge their regional associations within two years and formally establish their State Convention of Universalists. Alabama Universalists would form their own state convention in 1858.

Although Andrews provided the initial encouragement for these efforts and applied for his paper's editorial support, he did not see his efforts come to fruition.

In February 1839, Andrews ended his involvement in the Evangelical Universalist when he dissolved his partnership with the remaining owner of the paper, Jerome Harris. Andrews then left Macon and returned to his childhood home of Pittsburgh, Pennsylvania.

There are only scattered references of Andrews after he departed Macon for Pittsburgh. There is a record that he preached at his former Callowhill Church and attended the Democratic Convention to renominate Martin Van Buren for president of the United States in Philadelphia. His trip to Pittsburgh, where his parents lived, may have been motivated by family concerns.

=== Feasterville, South Carolina ===
At some time, Andrews left Pittsburgh and returned South, settling in Feasterville, South Carolina. Andrews was familiar with Feasterville and its school, which the Feaster family ran. In 1838, he had preached at the Feasterville Liberty Universalist Meetinghouse and attended the South Carolina State Universalist Convention in nearby Newberry.

In a June 1841 letter, Andrews shared that he was preaching in the Liberty Meetinghouse and mentoring John A. Chapman in his Universalist theological studies. Chapman represented a generational connection to those who first adopted Universalism in South Carolina. He was the grandson of Giles Chapman, who, along with Rev. Elijah Linch, established Universalism in the western districts of South Carolina.

It appears the primary reason Andrews settled in Feasterville was employment at the Feasterville Academy. He signed a $800 yearlong contract to be a principal and teacher at the academy for the 10-month academic year starting in January 1842.

During his time in Feasterville, Andrews officiated the funeral of Rev. Elijah Linch and served as Feasterville's Postmaster. It is not known when Andrews left Feasterville.

== Secular Newspapers ==
In 1844, Andrews abandoned religious activities for the next 25 years and turned his attention to publishing secular, commercial newspapers, and other secular endeavors. Andrews shared that he moved to Columbus, Georgia and undertook to publish a secular newspaper "to escape the penalty adjudged to those who did not provide for their own household."

=== Democrat Muscogee and Mercantile Advertiser ===
In 1844, Andrews began publishing The Muscogee Democrat and Mercantile Advertiser in Columbus. Andrews's populism and egalitarianism were on display in the paper's motto, which read, "As little government as possible, that little emanated from and controlled by the people and uniform in its application to all."

The paper's title was shortened to the Muscogee Democrat in 1849 and continued under that title until it became the Southern Sentinel in 1850. W.H. Chambers then published it.

=== Alabama Medical Institute ===
In November 1845, while still publishing his paper, Andrews was briefly a faculty member for the newly organized Alabama Medical Institute. The Alabama Legislature recently chartered the school with a curriculum based on Samuel Thomson's herbalist practices. Located in Wetumpka, Alabama, eighty miles from Columbus, Andrews taught chemistry and medical botany.

In support of this new school or seeking a business opportunity, Andrews proposed publishing the Southern Medical Expositor, a newspaper covering lectures, reports, botanical sketches, and other related topics from the institute.

The paper was never published. The Alabama Medical Institute closed its doors after only a single session.

=== Georgia Citizen ===
At some time, Andrews relocated his family 100 miles from Columbus to Macon, where, in March 1850, he started publishing the Georgia Citizen.

Like his previous Columbus paper, the Georgia Citizen's motto, "Independent in all things, neutral in nothing," reflected Andrews's independent spirit. He stressed that he and his paper were "above the influence of party or sect" (italics in original), and he, therefore, had the "largest liberty" to speak unrestrainedly on "all matters, moral, social and political." He pledged to advance the interests of the people of Georgia, oppose monopolies and "every form of tyranny over the mind of man."

This weekly paper was a workman-like effort providing a wide selection of classified ads and local, national, and international news with a liberal policy to publish letters to the editor. A policy, in August 1850, resulted in a mob attacking his office, damaging his equipment, and demanding that he leave the city.

Sparking this chain of events was a letter published in the Georgia Citizen dated August 21, 1850, signed as Gabriel from Atlanta, Georgia. The letter writer recounted, along with other topics, the construction travails of a building designed for the sale of slaves in that city. Heavy rains had destroyed a building wall. The writer opined, "For my part, I am free to say I should rejoice to see it razed to the ground as often as its owner rebuilds it."

The letter agitated some to charge Andrews, quite erroneously, that he "savored too strongly" abolition. A mob formed and ransacked his printing office. Despite the damage, Andrews quickly responded with a single sheet, half-page, two-column Extra edition of the Georgia Citizen affirming his Southern bona fides, "I am as sound as the next man on the subject of Southern Institution." He offered other motives underlying the attacks, such as his pro-Unionist sentiments in an increasingly hostile successionist South. This attack did not deter Andrews. He continued his Macon paper for several years after this incident.

Six years later, in February 1856, Andrews sought to reduce the paper's demands on him. He advertised for either a partner or a new owner of his venture. In October, he realized a unique solution when he sold the "job office," the paper's printing facilities, to his son Lewis H. Andrews. The senior Andrews retained editorial control over the Georgia Citizen while outsourcing the papers' production to his son. His son printed his father's paper and simultaneously solicited other business such as printing books, pamphlets, posters, handbills, etc.

The paper continued in various formats, including daily, bi-weekly, and tri-weekly editions until about 1861. At that time, the "job office" equipment was sold at a sheriff's sale to satisfy unpaid taxes.

After the American Civil War (1861–1865), Andrews revived the Daily Georgia Citizen in early 1866. A year later, in mid-1867, Andrews moved to Americus, Georgia, where he published the paper as a tri-weekly journal. Andrews ended his association with paper in 1869 when he sold his interest to O.V. Lamar.

=== Christian Spiritualist ===
While still publishing the Georgia Citizen, Andrews began publication of a new semi-monthly journal called the Christian Spiritualist in October 1858. His publication was the revival of a newspaper of the same name published in New York City by the Society for the Diffusion of Spiritual Knowledge from 1854 to 1857. Andrews's new journal defended and illustrated the "Philosophy of Spiritualism in its Christian aspects."

Andrews's conversion to spiritualism played out in the pages of his Georgia Citizen. In the spring of 1858, many articles on spiritualism appeared in his paper. The first article was framed as, "Having our curiosity. . .excited . . . we accepted the polite invitation of a friend to visit a Circle" meeting. Andrews described "manifestations" orchestrated by a medium communicating between the living and the spirit world. The living would ask a question, and the medium would interpret the response from the spirit world with raps on the table: one for "no," two for "I don't know," and three for "yes." A "writing medium" communicated the thoughts of spirits through transcription in various handwriting styles.

For two months, Andrews wrote a column entitled "Modern Spiritualism," in which he engaged vocal skeptics of spiritualism in a devil's advocate give and take. At the outset of this series, Andrews noted that he was "still a humble enquirer into the hidden mysteries of the spiritual theory," adding he had not yet acquired sufficient information to speak with conviction about the "truth" of the matter.

Andrews's remaining reluctance vanished after a July 1858 trip to New York City and his visit with the editor of the Spiritual Telegraph. There, he attended several circle meetings where he communicated with departed family members. He shared that the manifestations "were amply sufficient to satisfy my reason and convince my judgment of their truth and deep significance." Among the revelations that moved Andrews was the medium's communication with the afterworld, which confirmed that his mother never called him Lewis but always referred to him by this third name, Wilson.

Two years later, Andrews's fervor had not subsided. He hosted Miss Emma Hardinge, a noted Spiritual, on her visit to Macon in the summer of 1860.

It has not been determined how long Andrews published the Christian Spiritualist, but it appears to have ceased publication along with the Georgia Citizen in 1861. It is not understood how long Andrews retained his embrace of spiritualist beliefs.

=== Daily Confederate ===
Two years into the American Civil War (1861–1865), Andrews began publishing another newspaper from Macon called The Daily Confederate. The first edition appeared in February 1863 and reflected Andrews's other publishing enterprises. It contained an assortment of ads, general news, human interest stories, reports on local Confederate soldiers killed or wounded, and the "latest telegraphic" information."

Even Andrews's business acumen honed after many years as a newspaper publisher were challenged by wartime shortages and inflationary pressures. Ten months after commencing the publication, he announced in an article entitled "Startling Announcement" that he was facing stiff increases in the cost of newsprint and ink. Before the war, paper cost $4.00 per ream. Now the cost was $45.00. In response to rising costs and a desire to continue to make his paper affordable, Andrews informed his readers he would reduce the number of pages printed.

Andrews was a "newspaper man" who felt he gave people a needed service. Closing his article, he wrote, "The Press should not be suffered to fail. It is the right arm of the republic in this terrible revolution and as indispensable to its success as an 'army with banners.'"

Despite his efforts to continue, Andrews sold the paper to Henry Linden Flash in February 1864, almost a year to the day when he began publishing. Flash was the former editor of the Mobile Register and was the editor of Andrews's Daily Confederate. The year 1864 would bring a further setback when, eight months later, Andrews received word that his son John Calhoun had been killed in action.

== Preaching Resumed ==
Around 1867, after nearly a quarter-century absence, Andrews returned to preaching the gospel of the restitution of all. Not surprisingly, given his background in publishing, he also became a chronicler of Southern Universalism, publishing his preaching and travels in the Cincinnati-based Star of the South.

Only speculation can answer why Andrews returned to the field of preaching. Given the small, rural, and scattered societies, Universalist ministers generally financed their labors with other secular endeavors, typically farming. Having concluded a successful career in publishing, Andrews had the means to support his preaching. There was also a pressing need for Universalist ministers to enter the field. The Civil War had decimated southern Universalist societies and their state convention structures.

Whatever his reasoning, Andrews resumed his ministerial efforts reflecting the zeal of his youth when he published the Southern Evangelist in 1834, pledging, "Do the work of an Evangelist – Putting on the Breastplate of Faith and Love and for a Helmet, the Hope of Salvation."

=== Multi-state Ministry ===
Andrews began his Southern circuit riding without coordination with the national Universalist denomination in Boston, Massachusetts. Before the American Civil War, the question of slavery created a divide of trust and common purpose between Northern and Southern Universalists that had not yet been bridged.

The national denomination, which relied upon self-reporting from Southern ministers, had only fragmentary information about the dire situation of Universalism in the former Confederacy. The 1870 Universalist Register, the official record of statistics for the denomination, reported that in North Carolina, South Carolina, Georgia, Alabama, Mississippi, and Louisiana, not a single organized Universalist society existed. However, investment by the national denomination was still a decade away.

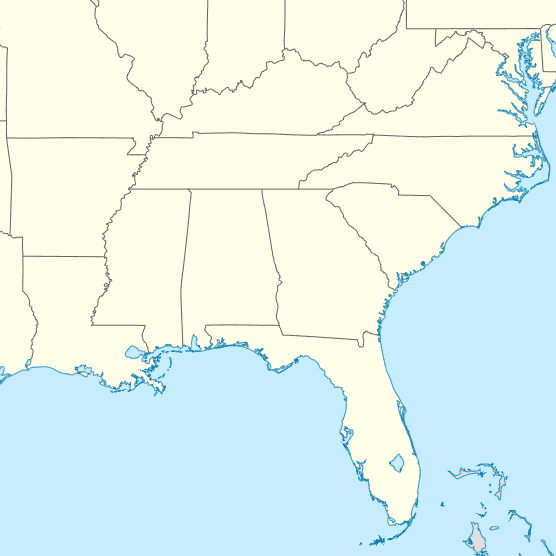
Partial Listing of Andrews's Preaching Circuit

==== Georgia ====
Andrews, 65, began his eight-year circuit riding ministry in Georgia. In 1867, he reorganized the Rockwell church. Established in 1839, the church collapsed during the American Civil War. It was known as the First Universalist Church of Jackson when Andrews reorganized. Four years later, a new church building was erected in 1881, and the church changed its name to the Mulberry Church. Later, the name was changed again to the Rockwell Universalist Church located near Winder, Georgia.

Andrews also attended the reconstituted Georgia State Convention of Universalists. In 1869, the convention held at the Plains of Dura elected Andrews as its president. The following year, the convention, held at the Harmony Church near Senoia, nominated Andrews as its delegate to the 1871 U.S. Convention of Universalists. The only delegate from the Southern states, Andrews appealed to the denomination to allocate financial resources to establish anchor churches in the Georgia cities of Atlanta, Savannah, Macon, Augusta, and Columbus. No action was taken.

His Georgia ministry also included Marietta, Ellaville, Schley, and small Universalist clusters in Glascock, Warren, Morgan, Talbot, Whitesburg, and Carrol counties.

Aided by improved railway service, Andrews's ministry reached far from his home in Americus, Georgia, to Alabama, Tennessee, Mississippi, and Louisiana, with additional trps to Arkansas, Florida, and Texas. Andrews's preaching trips typically lasted a month or more. For example, in the fall of 1873, his schedule included preaching at seven locations in three states.

==== Alabama ====
Andrews noted that Camp Hill, Alabama, was "one of my regular places of preaching." Rev. C.F.R. Shehane organized the Universalist society of Camp Hill in 1846. Prior to the American Civil War, Camp Hill had been on the preaching circuit for a number of Southern ministers, including Rev. S.J. McMorris, who had assisted Andrews with the publication of his denominational paper and Rev. J.C. Burruss, who was the editor of the South's longest published denominational paper, The Universalist Herald. After the war, Rev. D.B. Clayton, a circuit-riding minister from South Carolina also preached at Camp Hill.

His Alabama ministry also included Prattville, Autaugaville, and Meridianville.

==== Kentucky ====
The Kentucky State Convention of Universalists was formed in 1843, composed of the Licking River Association, formed in 1845, Green River and Murray formed in 1845, and Pingree formed in 1884. Like other Universalist state organizations, this convention collapsed during the American Civil War.

In June 1870, Andrews attended the reorganization meeting of the Pingree Association held at the Consolidation Church. In 1875, the Pingree Association relinquished its authority to enable the formation of the State Convention of Universalists.

==== Louisiana ====
Andrews's lone preaching station in Louisiana was Minden. In 1870, he dedicated the new church building built in that city.

==== Mississippi ====
Andrews's preaching stations in Mississippi included Egypt and Iuka.

==== Tennessee ====
Andrews's preaching stations in Tennessee included Center Point, Collierville, Covington, Henderson Station, Jack's Creek, La Grange, Memphis, Mifflin, Ripley, and Shelby Depot, located 20 miles north of Memphis.

Andrews had labored for three years in Shelby Depot prior to organizing the new society in 1872. Andrews credits his success partly to the hostility orthodox ministers exhibited toward Universalism. Prior to Andrews's arrival, the elders at the local Missionary Baptist Church purged suspected members who harbored Universalist beliefs from its communion roles. Andrews offered many of them "the right hand of fellowship," helping him form the nucleus of a Universalist society.

==== Extended Preaching Circuit ====
Andrews's preaching circuit extended into Texas during June and July 1873, where he preached in Longview and Upshur County.

In May 1873, Andrews preached in Drew County, Arkansas. No other information is available.

No information has been found regarding his travels to Florida.

=== Christian Crucible ===
In July 1871, Andrews began publishing a new semi-monthly newspaper called the Christian Crucible. He described his new paper as a religious journal to support and defend the "Bible Doctrine of the 'Final Holiness and Happiness of all men.'" He promised its pages would be dedicated to "Free Thought, Free Discussion, and Rational Exposition."

However, Andrews found maintaining his circuit preaching and paper publication challenging. He announced in August 1874 that he was suspending publication, hoping to resume it in October. Andrews eventually transferred his mailing list to the Star in the West and ceased publication.

=== Messenger of the Covenant ===
In early 1873, Andrews began publication of yet another Universalist periodical, the Messenger of the Covenant. The Messenger was not Andrews's typical newspaper format but a 32-page magazine devoted to defending and illustrating the "final salvation of all men." V.P. Sisson & Company printed the magazine in Atlanta, Georgia.

His magazine was favorably received. One reviewer commented on Andrews's "illustration" of Universalism, stating, "Universalism must be understood before it can be refuted." The reviewer, the editor of a Georgia-based newspaper, recommended the magazine to his readers.

As with his Christian Crucible, Andrews found it difficult to balance the publication of this magazine with his circuit preaching, and it ceased publication after a few issues.

== Publications ==
- A Looking Glass for Fanatics, collection of case studies of insanity, suicide, and murder – 1831.
- Original Lecture Sermons – 1832.
- The Two Opinions, or Salvation and Damnation, being an inquiry into the truth of certain theological tenets – 1838.
- A Development of Modern Universalism, debate between Andrews and Rev. John C. Hope, Lutheran – 1841.
- Twelve Theological Lectures – 1841.
- Presbyterianism vs. Universalism, or a Theological Correspondence between Rev. John Andrews, Presbyterian and Dr. L.F.W. Andrews, Universalist – 1870.

== Theology ==
Andrews's parents raised him in a Calvinist belief system that held a sovereign God had a predetermined plan for the fate of souls. God "elected" some to be saved who would enjoy an eternity of bliss and others were "unelected" who faced endless misery. This predestination of souls, often called unconditional election, could not be changed by one's character or actions in mortal life. That is, God's plans could not be thwarted.

Andrews rejected the belief system of his youth as unjust. The God in his belief system was a God of infinite love. He held that condemning souls to "endless misery is an ultimate and absolute evil, and that such evil cannot exist in the presence of Infinite Love." He turned to Universalism.

Less than 30 years before Andrews accepted the Universalist faith, The General Convention of Universalists of New England (later the U.S. Convention of Universalists) crafted the Winchester Profession of Faith in 1803. Andrews embraced the three articles of this profession of faith. One, scripture from the Old and New Testaments contains a revelation of God and the final destination of humankind. Two, belief in one God, whose nature is love. Three, holiness and true happiness are "inseparably connected."

=== Nature of God ===
In his first edition of the Southern Evangelists in 1834, Andrews affirmed that God was central to his Universalist theology. "We believe in the existence of a Supreme Intelligence—the Creator, Benefactor and Father of all men." The nature of the Universalist God is love. Universalists also believed that God had an eternal plan. A plan based on "divine harmony" that did not include endless evil or punishment. This divine plan could not be altered. "No accident can occur to thwart His divine purpose."

=== Original Sin and Total Depravity ===
Andrews also rejected the Calvinist's tenets of original sin and total depravity caused by the "fall of mankind." That fall, as portrayed by the actions of Adam and Eve in Genesis in the Hebrew Bible, allegedly irrevocably stained the souls of all humankind with eternal sin. Andrews wrote that Universalists "can see no justice or propriety in making the posterity of Adam responsible or culpable for the transgression of our first parent." He cited scripture, "The son shall not bear the iniquity of the father, neither shall the father bear the iniquity of the son. (Ezekiel 18:20). Adding, "Man comes pure from the hands of his Maker."

=== Sin ===
Andrews's reflections on sin were similar to those of his contemporary Universalist ministers.

Sin was part of the human condition. "Every man is tempted when he is drawn away of his own lust and enticed." That is, sin originated in the "lusts of the flesh." It did not originate in heaven or was the invention of fallen angels or devils. Like a living mortal who committed transgressions, sin was finite in its existence. Sin died with the mortal body. There could be no sin in the afterlife because souls, lacking any corporeal existence, were incapable of sin.

Andrews and other Universalists further argued that since mortals committed sin, sin could not transmogrify into transgressions that demanded eternal punishment. He argued that it was simply "preposterous and absurd" that a God of infinite love would create an "evil" that was "co-equal in duration as the Creator."

=== Trinity ===
Andrews believed, as did many Universalists, that the Trinity, the unity of the Godhead consisting of God the Father, Jesus the son of God, and the Holy Ghost, was scripturally unsupported. His position was clearly stated, "We are not Tri-theists or Trinitarians, who believe in a mysterious union of three Gods in one."

Not all Universalists rejected the Trinity. Rev. John Murray (1741–1815), credited as the founder of American Universalism, was a trinitarian. As was Rev. Elhanan Winchester (1751–1797), who emerged from the Baptist tradition to become a leading advocate for Universalism. However, belief in the Trinity increasingly became a minority position within the denomination.

=== Salvation ===
Central to Andrews's Universalism was the belief in the final restitution of all things. In his 1837 work, The Two Opinions of Salvation & Damnation, Andrews contrasted Universalist beliefs with those of leading Protestant denominations, Methodist, Episcopalian, Baptist, Catholic, and Presbyterian. Although differing on unessential points of doctrine and practice, all these sects, Andrews argued, held in common a theology that declared that only some of God's creations would achieve everlasting salvation. He concluded these sects were "justly entitled to the distinctive appellation of Limitarians or Partialists."

Although Andrews believed that all would eventually enjoy eternal happiness, his position on a period of future punishment before redemption is unclear. There were schools of thought within the Universalist community on the afterlife's path to happiness and holiness. One school called the ultra-Universalist, believed that souls would experience immediate salvation upon death. The other school, called restorationists, believed that a period of just punishment was required to cleanse the soul of any lingering sin prior to ascension to heavenly bliss. Andrews was most likely a restorationist, as were most early Southern Universalists. His writings often contained a detailed rationale for future corrective punishment.

== Death ==
L.F.W. Andrews died on March 17, 1875, at the age of 72. He had just returned to his home in Americus, Georgia after visiting Macon, where three of his children lived. Upon arriving home around noon, his wife greeted him and implored him to sit for some refreshments. Andrews sat down at the table, bowed his head and died.

The Masonic Lodge in Americus noted in their tribute that Dr. L.F.W. Andrews was a member of Americus Lodge No. 13 of Ancient, Free and Accepted Masons. His body was later transported to Macon, where members of his Masonic Lodge No. 5 conducted his funeral at the residence of Mr. T.J. Lane. His burial cemetery is unknown.
