= Allen Fuller (minister) =

American universalist minister (1798–1864)

Rev. Allen Fuller
- Born: April 23, 1798; Middleborough, Massachusetts, US
- Died: February 1, 1864 (aged 65); Endfield, South Carolina, US
- Occupation: Universalist Minister
- Spouse: Tabitha Worthington (née Summers)
- Religion: Universalist
- Ordained: 1828
- Offices held: Circuit Rider, Convention Moderator, Clerk

Allen Fuller (1798–1864) was a Massachusetts Universalist minister who responded to an 1830 request from South Carolina’s Universalists to assist in the organization and spread of Universalism in the South. Fuller labored for 30 years for the cause of Southern Universalism.

== Education ==
Although no information has been found regarding Fuller’s education, he received sufficient education to offer his services as a teacher. In 1822, he advertised his ability to tutor geography, mathematics, and English grammar. He also sold his textbook entitled Grammatical Exercises; being a plain and concise method of teaching English grammar. Original and selected.

A testimonial to Fuller's teaching skills appeared in the Old Colony Memorial and Plymouth Advertiser.

I can cheerfully recommend his method of teaching the elementary principles of the science. I think Mr. Fuller’s method of instructing will make the study of Grammar a pleasing exercise to young pupils, because they will understand what they are taught.

=== Marriage and children ===
In 1832, Fuller, 34, married Tabitha Worthington née Summers (1797–1861) in the Newberry District of South Carolina with Rev Elijah Linch officiating. Fuller had moved from Massachusetts to South Carolina a year earlier.

Information on the number of Tabitha’s children is inconsistent. One account indicated that she had five children; another listed ten children with her first husband. Fuller’s last will, written in June 1863, listed just three living stepchildren: John R. Worthington, Marcus A. Worthington, and Amelia A. Truss. No information has been found regarding children that may have resulted from her second marriage to Fuller.

== Northern ministry ==
In 1828, Fuller, 30, was officially welcomed into fellowship in the Old Colony Association. Established in 1817, the Old Colony Association was one of many associations providing an organizational structure for Massachusetts’ Universalist churches. Although Fuller was not a parish minister, he was active in the Association’s ministry. He preached, for example, at the dedication of the First Universalist Church in Essex and participated as a minister at the Association’s 1830 yearly assembly.

In 1830, he was listed as an itinerant preacher in New York State. In that capacity, he delivered the introductory sermon at the 1831 dedication of a new Universalist society in Cedarville, Herkimer County, New York. This dedication was among the last acts in his Northern ministry.

In November 1831, Fuller moved to South Carolina, citing health reasons. His destination was influenced by a call from South Carolina Universalists for “brethren in the Northern States” to relocate to the South and assist in the spread of Universalism.

== Southern ministry ==
Fuller labored for 30 years in the cause of Southern Universalism as a circuit rider, organizer, and spokesperson.

=== German Baptist Brethren to Universalist ===
As noted earlier, Fuller’s marriage to Worthington, née Summers, connected him to the families that nurtured Universalism from preaching within the German Baptist Brethren community.

In 1892, sixty years after Fuller’s arrival, a historical reflection in the Annals of Newberry: in two parts included this observation, “we meet with only the relics of the Dunkers or Dunkards...of this persuasion were originally the Chapmans, Summers, Lynches, Prathers, and Martins” from the Brethren community.

David Martin (1737–1794) was a preacher to these families and others in the Beaver Creek area near the Broad River. In 1772, the Baptist minister and historian Morgan Edwards recorded an observation of Martin in his history of South Carolina’s Baptists, saying he had “an excellent character.” Martin’s work was prodigious. Morgan recorded that Martin's Beaver Creek congregation included 25 families and 50 baptized members. Martin also preached to non-German-speaking settlers. For 14 years beginning in 1780, Martin gradually turned the Brethren in South Carolina toward universal salvation.

Although the preaching of universal salvation was not generally part of the Brethren’s religious practices, Roger E. Sappington observed in The Brethren in the Carolinas that the “Brethren’s emphasis on the New Testament and its pattern of God’s love through Christ had made the Brethren susceptible to the wiles of Universalism in the first place.”

Elijah Linch (1773–1842) (alternatively Lynch) next took up the leadership in preaching Universalism. Linch was also the transition agent for the Brethren in their evolution from a private to a public embrace of Universalism.

=== South Carolina Convention of Universalists ===
These early South Carolina Universalists observed that “the doctrine of universal benevolence has been dispensed among us, for the last age, with but little success.” This lack of success was attributed to the absence of a body to govern church affairs.

Thus, in November 1830, South Carolina Universalists gathered at the Hartford meetinghouse in the Newberry District and organized the South Carolina Convention of Universalists. The Convention organizers paid homage to Martin, referring to him as “the father of the cause in this vicinity.”

Like the Old Colony Association in Massachusetts, the South Carolina Convention enabled the state’s Universalists to grant letters of fellowship, ordain preachers, admit societies, and perform other administrative duties.

The leadership of the South Carolina Universalist Convention welcomed Fuller into their ranks. Fuller brought with him direct experience working within an organized regional structure. Fuller was also an institutionalist who believed that supporting organizational structures was vital to the spread of Universalism. Fuller expressed this view in an article entitled “Church Organization” in the Evangelical Universalist. He wrote

When our brethren in South Carolina abandoned the peculiarities of the Dunkards, they also laid aside their church organization, and the consequence was that they dwindled away until they well-nigh became extinct.

At his first South Carolina Convention of Universalists in 1832, Fuller served as the Convention’s clerk. He was also assigned administrative duties, including oversight of record keeping, harmonizing the church membership requirements, and publishing the post-convention circular letter.

This Convention met at a propitious time. The national General Convention of Universalists was on the verge of reorganizing its administrative structure, moving from regional associations to one based on state conventions. At that time, only eight state conventions existed: Maine, New Hampshire, Vermont, Connecticut, New York, Pennsylvania, Ohio, and South Carolina.

Fuller was nominated as South Carolina’s delegate to the 1883 national convention in Stafford, Vermont, but did not attend.

Despite Fuller’s absence, the General Convention of Universalists read into the record South Carolina’s Universalists’ caveated support for forming this new national organization.

On the subject of forming a General Convention of Universalists in the United States. . .we are decidedly in favor of forming the proposed convention provided the powers in it vested are only advisory.

(Italic in the original)

The newly adopted Constitution of the General Convention of Universalists also included similar language that limited its powers to only advisory. However, in less than a decade, the General Convention would clash with Southern Universalists over the issue of slavery. Fuller was among the leading spokespersons for the South, urging their Northern brethren “to heed the admonition” not to interfere on the subject of Southern slavery.

=== Continued involvement in the South Carolina State Convention ===
Fuller remained committed to the South Carolina State Convention for many years. He frequently offered a sermon at this annual event and served in official capacities. Fuller served as the Convention’s moderator (1836, 1838, 1859) or the clerk/standing clerk (1832, 1833, 1834, 1835, 1837, 1840, 1841, 1845, 1846). He frequently authored the post-convention circular letter.

The South Carolina Universalist Convention of Universalists continued for more than 30 years. It ceased due to the onset of the American Civil War (1861–1865).

=== Circuit riding ===
Immediately upon his arrival in November 1831, the Convention recruited Fuller to be the Convention’s circuit rider. Like his Northern ministry, he did not seek a parish ministry. This decision was based on the situation in South Carolina, where the churches were too small to afford a permanent minister. Consequently, the South Carolina Convention undertook the responsibility of providing preaching services through its circuit rider program.

Fuller outlined the scope of his preaching circuit in a letter to Thomas Whittemore, the editor of the Trumpet and Universalist Magazine. He recounted that his circuit included his hometown, Newberry District and churches in Lexington, Laurens, Fairfield, and Edgefield districts. He continued in his letter that he had also preached once in the Union District and Columbia, the state’s capital.

Although the Convention undertook the responsibility to provide preaching services, shortfalls in securing required revenue were a recurring problem for the Convention. After completing his first year of circuit riding, the Convention’s Corresponding Committee, which had made the original call for “brethren in the Northern States” to relocate to the South, reported that they had failed to raise the compensation promised to Fuller. Despite this failure, Fuller continued circuit riding.

Despite these difficulties, Fuller remained an advocate for the circuit-riding program. At the 1834 State Convention, he lamented the lack of action when the circuit riding subject was discussed. He warned

If the word is preached in several of the societies connected with this body the ensuing year, it must be done by some arrangement of this kind. It remains, therefore, with the brethren in the different sections to determine whether they will join hands with those of other parts, to support the preaching of the gospel in this state; or whether they will abandon all reasonable expectations of having any preaching among them.

In 1834, Fuller briefly received assistance from Rev. L.F.W Andrews. Andrews, another Northern-born Universalist minister, had come South on a request to become the minister of a newly formed church in Montgomery, Alabama. Andrews was temporarily in Georgia for the dedication of the new Harmony Church in the Anderson District.

The Harmony Church dedication contributed another minister, James Mullikin, to the small pool of the Convention’s circuit riders, consisting of the aging Rev. Elijah Linch, Fuller, and the occasional visiting minister. Fuller and Mullikin shared administrative duties at the 1837 annual Convention, with Mullikin as moderator and Fuller as clerk. Mullikin was officially ordained at the 1838 State Convention in a ceremony conducted by Fuller, Linch, and Andrews.

Andrews exerted influence beyond South Carolina. After his one-year pastorate in Montgomery, he assumed the pastorate the Universalist church in Charleston, South Carolina in 1835. Andrews’s wider influence came from his publication of the Southern Evangelist (the paper would undergo several names and publication locations). With his move from Montgomery to Charleston, Andrews relocated his paper to that city and recruited Fuller as an associate editor along with Rev. H.F. Stearns and Rev. S.J. McMorris, both from Alabama. Fuller continued his editorial assistance when the ownership of this paper passed to Rev. Philo Brownson and was renamed the Southern Universalist in 1840.

Due to health issues late in 1835, Fuller paused his circuit riding. He reported that his eyesight had temporarily failed due to an inflammation in one of his eyes. He would recover and resume circuit riding, but health problems would continue to plague him.

Three years after Fuller’s plea to improve the circuit riding program, the 1837 State Convention acted. It placed renewed focus on circuit preaching and appointed Fuller as the Convention’s agent with oversight powers for this endeavor. The Convention also designated representatives from all churches within the Convention to assist Fuller.

Improvements resulted from this renewed focus on circuit riding. At the next State Convention in 1838, it was reported that $250 had been raised. That Convention also addressed the instability that local societies had on the program. The societies in Lexington and Laurens Districts had faltered that year and thus could not be relied upon to be preaching stations. To provide more structure to the circuit riding program, 13 permanent “preaching stations,” a collection of meetinghouses owned or open to Universalists, courthouses, and private homes, were identified. A circuit rider would visit each station four times a year.

Despite progress made in the circuit riding program, Fuller, citing “domestic arrangements,” announced that he was stepping down from oversight of the circuit riding program but would continue circuit riding.

It is unclear what Fuller meant by “domestic arrangements,” but it could be related to his recent purchase of a farm. In 1837, Fuller purchased a farm which he named Salubrity. The name refers to something healthful to the mind and body, especially regarding air and climate. Two years later, in 1839, Fuller established the Salubrity Post Office and was designated postmaster.

At the 1839 State Convention, he reported that he preached at the designated stations. He also noted that the funds raised had been “satisfactory compensation for his labor.” Consequently, the State Convention reappointed Fuller as its circuit preacher.

However, just months after his reappointment, Fuller completely withdrew from the Convention’s circuit rider program. In his January 1840 announcement, he shared that his resignation was “not on account of a deficiency in the Subscriptions, but from considerations of a personal nature.” It is assumed that farm responsibilities, his health, or a combination of both compelled Fuller to step down from circuit riding.

Fuller did not withdraw his support to the State Convention. He continued his appointment as the Convention’s Standing Clerk, allowing him to conduct the business of the Convention when it was not in session.

=== D.B. Clayton ===
Rev. Daniel Bragg Clayton (1817–1906), a Southern Universalist minister who continued Fuller’s efforts to spread Universalism, credits Fuller with his conversion to Universalism. In his autobiography, Forty-Seven Years in the Universalist Ministry, Clayton wrote of Fuller in a chapter entitled “A Tribute to a Good Man.” “Mr. Fuller was also one of the most scrupulous, conscientious men the writer ever saw.”

Their first meeting was a chance encounter in 1838. Fuller had come to Van Patton’s Mill to have the wool from his farm processed. Clayton was employed at the mill as a teacher. A well-known preacher, Fuller, agreed to delay his departure home and preach.

Clayton described Fuller's impromptu oration, the first Universalist sermon he had ever heard, as manna for a hungry soul. He was struck by the absence of the threats of hopeless misery in the afterlife often heard at his Baptist Bethel Church. Instead, Fuller preached a message of a merciful and loving God. Twenty years his senior, Fuller took the young Clayton on as his protégé.

Clayton was receptive to Fuller’s appeal for him to pursue a ministry in Universalism. Fuller and Rev. C.F.R. Shehane ordained Clayton seven years later at the 1845 South Carolina Universalist Convention. Fuller and Clayton remained close colleagues and friends until Fuller died in 1864.

== Alabama ==
Fuller’s first visit to Alabama was in 1834. The primary objective of his ten-week, 800-mile journey from his home in South Carolina was to attend the dedication of Georgia’s first Universalist meetinghouse in Harris County. Fuller traveled the additional 150 miles to Montgomery to preach at the newly erected Universalist church in that city.

After nearly two decades living in South Carolina, Fuller moved to Trussville, Alabama in search of new farmland. Fuller confessed that his Salubrity farm was no longer productive. In an 1848 article in the Gospel Banner, Fuller shared the state of his farm.

Corn grows well on [the] plantation; but the yield is very small. . .Wheat can hardly be raised. The winter often kills it, and the Hessian fly destroys it. Oats are poor. . .Rye does well generally. Our potatoes are watery things; sweet potatoes are the main crop; but they seldom sell.

The opportunity to secure new farmland was made possible by the Federal expulsion of Native Americans which opened eastern Alabama to white settlement. His Trussville farm consisted of 50 improved acres and 163 unimproved acres. Fuller raised livestock (mostly swine), grew wheat, corn, peas, beans, potatoes as well as ginned cotton and produced butter.

His Alabama farm also differed from his South Carolina farm in its use of enslaved people. At Salubrity, Fuller, through his marriage to Worthington, acquired two domestic enslaved people that he used along with White hired labor to work his fields. By 1860, his Trussville farm used up to 30 enslaved field hands.

Although Fuller continued to travel widely across the South, Alabama would remain his home until his death.

== Southern organizer ==
In the years leading up to the American Civil War, Fuller was a prominent leader in the Southern Universalist movement. He played a key role in establishing Southern Universalist organizational structures and was instrumental in shaping a Southern Universalist identity that was distinct from that of their Northern counterparts.

=== Slavery ===
Understanding the actions of Fuller and Southern Universalists from 1840 to the start of the American Civil War (1861–1865) must be seen in the context of slavery.

Up until the 1830s, the national Universalist denomination’s position on slavery was cautious, stating only that it was inconsistent with the idea of an “all-inclusive human family.” Denomination-wide action on abolition was deemed divisive and was generally avoided.

Perceptions of slavery changed in 1839 when Rev. Sylvanus Cobb founded the Christian Freeman and Family Visiter (SIC). Cobb’s Massachusetts-based Universalist periodical advocated social reform, especially slavery. In the second issue of his paper, Cobb published an article entitled “What Can We Do?” The article was a call to action to Universalists to "establish the principle of free discussion and deliver a large portion of the community from the slavish fear of looking at a great moral subject.”

With Cobb’s support, the first Anti-Slavery Convention was held in Lynn, Massachusetts in 1840. This Convention challenged Southern Universalists' identification with slavery, stating that “no individual can be a consistent Universalist who refuses to acknowledge the sinfulness of Slavery.” A second Anti-Slavery convention was held a year later, followed by another the following year. As a result, Northern Universalists began to assume a more organized and confrontational profile against slavery.

South Carolina Universalists responded to their Northern brethren with their own resolution at their 1841 State Convention.

Resolved, that we entirely disapprove of any interference with the subject of negro slavery by the people of those States where it does not exist; and we solemnly protest against any action on the subject by the brethren of our order. (italics in the original)

Fuller, who wrote the convention's circular letter, expanded upon this protest resolution.

Another very important subject came under consideration and was acted on by the Convention—the disposition on the part of the people of the Northern States to interfere with the subject of Slavery. Holding that they have no right thus to interfere, and that such interference will be productive of immense evil, even if it does not cause a total dismemberment of the happy Union, which will surely be the result if such a course be persisted in, we have raised our voices against it. We would earnestly and affectionately entreat our brethren at the North, as they regard our welfare, as they desire the welfare of our cause, as they value our National Union to heed our admonition.

Fuller then introduced the above resolution at the 1841 meeting of Georgia’s Northern Association of Universalists. The Association's delegates unanimously adopted the resolution.

Fuller’s protest had no impact on the trajectory of the national denomination. The 1843 General Convention of Universalists issued resolutions against slavery that reflected the new thinking of the denomination. Specifically, “the holding in bondage of our brethren for whom Christ died, or the treatment of any human being with obloquy harshness, or any indignity on account of his color or race [was] contrary to righteousness, inconsistent with Christianity and especially with that doctrine of Universal Grace and Love which we cherish as the most important of revealed truth.”

Fuller’s advocacy for the Southern Universalist policy on slavery made him a target in the Northern Universalist press. The Michigan-based Primitive Expounder upbraided Fuller in 1845 for his myopic grasp of the disconnect between Universalism and slavery.

In a letter to the Primitive Expounder, Fuller lamented the disheartening prospects for Southern Universalism. His letter noted that James Mullikin, ordained in 1837, had stopped preaching, and John A. Chapman, a member of an influential South Carolina Universalist family, had returned his letter of fellowship.

The editors of the Expounder were unmoved by Fuller’s lament. Instead, they observed that the root of Southern Universalism's woes was its embrace of slavery. The editors observed that Universalism “teaches that all mankind are brethren born with equal rights and privileges . . . With this doctrine, slavery can never be reconciled.” The Primitive Expounder concluded that slavery “will sink into oblivion.”

Thomas Whittemore, editor of the Boston-based Trumpet and Universalist Magazine, also publicly challenged Fuller’s position on slavery. Whittemore commented on Fuller’s otherwise mundane 1848 travel log observations of how things had changed in the nearly 20 years since he left the North. Whittemore wrote

Among the changes in New England during that time, there is one very important one, which he did not mention, viz. the universal disgust and horror with which the people of the north view the attempt to extend slavery over the territory now free. This is the general settlement of the northern states.

== Georgia ==
Fuller’s first visit to Georgia came shortly after he arrived in South Carolina. In 1832, he accompanied Robert Coleman and his family, prominent South Carolina Universalists, on their westward migration in search of new farmland. As he traversed Georgia, he preached to clusters of Universalists in the Georgia counties of Butts, Newton, Walton, and Wilkes.

=== First Georgia Universalist Meetinghouse ===
Two years later, in October 1834, Fuller embarked on another tour of Georgia. The trip’s objective was the dedication of Georgia’s first Universalist meetinghouse in Mulberry Grove in Harris County. He also preached in the Georgia counties of Oglethorpe, Walton, Henry, and Pike.

Fuller had anticipated being assisted in the dedication by Willis Atkins, a soon-to-be ordained Universalist preacher and Rev. L.F.W. Andrews, who was then the pastor at the church in Montgomery, Alabama. Both were detained, leaving Fuller to conduct the three-day dedication service.

In an article Fuller wrote for Andrews’ Southern Evangelist, he shared that the new structure was to be called the “Republican Meeting House.” The term “republican,” in this usage, meant that the building was open to all denominations. The emphasis on the openness was directed at the nearby Baptist community. The Baptists had earlier opened their meetinghouse to the Universalists and then later refused the Universalists further use of their meetinghouse, necessitating the Universalists to build their own structure.

Fuller continued his journey, touring Alabama and preaching in Montgomery, as well as the new meetinghouse constructed by Atkins at Mt. Olympus in the fork of the Coosa and Tallapoosa Rivers. On his route home through Georgia, he preached in Talbot and Jones counties.

=== Regional Associations Organized ===
Four years after Fuller’s dedication of the Republican Meeting House in Harris County, Georgia’s Universalists organized two regional associations of Universalists. The first association, the Chattahoochee Association, consisting of counties in central Georgia and eastern Alabama, was formed at an 1838 meeting at the Mulberry Grove Republican Meeting House. The second association, the Northern Associations of Universalists, was also formed in 1838. Fuller attended this Northern organizational event, offered a sermon, assisted in drafting the association’s constitution, and wrote the post-convention circular letter.

Fuller supported such associations, stating, “It is by association that he is powerful—by union that he is able to exert such a wonderful influence over his fellowman.

=== State Convention Organized ===
Both regional associations were short-lived. Two years later, in July 1840, the Georgia State Convention of Universalists was organized at a meeting held in Macon. Fuller attended this inaugural convening of the State Convention and served as the Convention’s clerk.

It would be seven years before Fuller returned to Georgia to attend the 1847 Georgia State Convention. By the mid-1850s, Fuller was a regular participant at the Georgia State Convention. By then, the Georgia State Convention had become a central meeting place for opposition to Northern abolitionist policies. Fuller was the moderator for the 1856 and 1857 conventions.

== Growing Separation ==
The 1854 Georgia State Convention was a watershed moment for Southern Universalists. There was a sense among Southern Universalists that they were on the cusp of a new era. Slavery was moving Southern Universalists closer together based on a shared pride for their uniquely defined Southern Universalism. There was a desire for self-sufficiency—to be beholden to no one, especially their Northern brethren.

Delegates at the 1854 Georgia State Convention directly responded to resolutions from the General Convention of Universalists of that same year. Citing the Kansas-Nebraska Act, the General Convention amplified its public denunciation of slavery, condemning the “evil and sin of American slavery.” The Kansas-Nebraska Act effectively repealed the 1820 Missouri Compromise, allowing new states entering the Union to self-determine if they wished to be slave or free. Southern Universalists, tied to the agricultural economy, saw this change as depressing opportunities for future migrations with their slaves to newly opened farmland.

The Georgia State Convention issued its own counter-resolution, stating, “We disclaim having any connection with the Universalists of the North.” The resolution recommended that Universalists across the South organize a Southern General Convention to represent the interests of Southern Universalists. Fuller did not attend this convention but would be directly involved in forming the Southern General Convention.

== Southern General Convention ==
Two years later, at the 1856 Georgia State Convention, action was taken to further the organization of the Southern General Convention. Fuller was the Convention’s moderator and assigned to a committee of three consisting of M.B. Pickett, B.F. Strain, and himself to coordinate the formal organization of the Southern General Convention of Universalists. The Convention issued a called for all Southern Universalists to attend next year’s Georgia State Convention.

Unsurprisingly, the 1857 George State Convention was well-attended by ministers and lay leaders from Alabama, Georgia, North and South Carolina. Fuller was again the Convention moderator.

The resolutions passed at this convention show a sense of urgency. Universalists were urged to organize themselves into churches as quickly as possible. Lacking an opportunity to organize a church, Southern Universalists should take the opportunity “whenever two or more” gathered to join in “social worship.” Another resolution implored Universalists to withhold funding for any denominational projects not sympathetic to the Universalist cause.

J.C.C. Feaster from South Carolina concluded the Convention with the following resolution.

Resolved. That we shall call upon our friends throughout the South to unite with us for the purpose of forming a General Southern Convention of Universalists, whose duty it shall be to exercise jurisdiction over our preachers of the South and other matters pertaining to the prosperity of our Zion. (bold added)

The formal organization of the Southern General Convention of Universalists occurred the following year on August 3, 1858, at a meeting at the Liberty Universalist Church in Feasterville, South Carolina. No record of the proceedings survived. However, it can be inferred that the ministers who attended the August 3 meeting were the same ministers who attended the South Carolina Convention held two days later also at the Liberty Universalist Church. Those ministers were Allen Fuller and J.C. Burruss (Alabama), S.J. McMorris (Mississippi), B.F. Strain (Georgia), and E.H. Lake (North Carolina).

The public announcement on forming the Southern General Convention insisted the convention did not wish to arouse sectional or party emotions. Instead, the Southern General Convention was designed “to concentrate and unite the brethren in the promotion of the great and glorious cause of the true South.” However, given the immediate history of the Southern General Convention, the underlying motivation of the convention was to rally the sectional emotions of Southern Universalists.

The South General Convention of Universalists existed for just three years. The American Civil War then ravaged the South, nearly extinguishing the Southern Universalist presence.

Fuller was also nearing the end of his Southern Universalist ministry. He attended his last Convention in 1860, which met in Feasterville, South Carolina. Fuller's protégé, Rev. D.B. Clayton, also in attendance, poignantly noted that Fuller offered the closing sermon for the Convention. Fuller died four years later.

== Universalist Historical Society ==
Fuller was a Corresponding Secretary for the Universalist Historical Society since its founding in 1834. The objective of this Society was “to collect and preserve facts pertaining to the history and condition” of the denomination.

Yearly Society records regarding who served as a Corresponding Secretary are spotty. It has been confirmed that Fuller was a Corresponding Secretary for the following years: 1834, 1835, 1836, 1837, 1838, 1842, and 1844.

== Publications ==
Below is a list of publications attributed to Fuller. In his 1865 will, Fuller provided $500 for the “purpose of publishing my writings.” Dr. Abner G. Teague was to fulfill Fuller’s final desire. However, no publications attributed to Fuller have been found after he died in 1864.

- Grammatical Exercises; being a plain and concise method of teaching English grammar. Original and selected – 1822. Publisher: A. Danforth, Plymouth, MA.
- The Gospel of Christ; a Dialogue between a Minister and an Inquirer after truth – 1833. Publisher: Unknown.
- The Contrast: a tale written for the New York Christian Messenger and Philadelphia Universalist – 1835. Publisher: Messenger and Universalist Press, New York.
- Letters of Rev. N.W. Hodges: in reply to his "Letters on Universalism" – 1836. Publisher: Southern Evangelist,SC.

== Death ==
Fuller, having long suffered from respiratory ailments, died of pneumonia in February 1864 at the home of Dr. Abner G. Teague in Edgefield, South Carolina. Fuller, at the time of his death, was traveling from his home in Trussville, Alabama.
