= The Herald of Freedom =

Universalist-leaning weekly Connecticut newspaper published by P.T. Barnum (1831-1834)

The Herald of Freedom, 1831–1834, was a weekly Connecticut newspaper published by P.T. Barnum. It was a Universalist-leaning paper that Barnum used as a vehicle to engage in the political debate over the relationship between church and state.

== Origin ==
The Herald of Freedom arose from Connecticut's political tumult caused by the shifting of the state's power structure from colonial church-state elites to a Jacksonian populace. Unlike other Revolutionary colonies, Connecticut retained its colonial constitution following the conclusion of the American Revolutionary War . As late as 1816, the Federalist Party and the Congregationalist church continued to wield power throughout the state.

However, with the adoption of a new Connecticut Constitution in 1818, the legal framework that enabled the generational influence of the Congregational church had been abolished. Also on the wane was the Federalist Party, that dominated national politics from 1789 to 1801.

P. T. Barnum, a young businessman at the time, advocated for the dismantling of the political power of church-state elites. When religious revivalism began sweeping Connecticut, he grew concerned that the church-state old guard would harness this revivalism to retain power. Seeking a public outlet for his concerns, in 1831, Barnum wrote letters to the Danbury Recorder expressing his concern about the encroaching danger of religious interference in political affairs. The editor of this conservative newspaper refused to print his letters. Reflecting on this refusal to print his letters, Barnum wrote in his autobiography, "I accordingly purchased a press and types, and on October 19, 1831, I issued the first number of my own paper, The Herald of Freedom."

== Prospectus ==
Published in Bethel, Connecticut, The Herald of Freedom reflected the egalitarian nature of its young 21-year-old editor and owner.

The Stamford Sentinel reported the following from the Herald of Freedom’s prospectus

Our paper will . . . take a decided and impartial stand in support of sound, rational, and Biblical Religion, in opposition to Bigotry, Superstition, Fanaticism, and Hypocrisy. Against these we shall ever warmly contend whether we find them supported by our friends or our foes. In the defence of Truth we commence our editorial career.

The Sentinel continued noting Barnum’s adamant opposition to the “Church and State Party” and his unwavering commitment to “Democratic principles.”

The American Mercury, published in Hartford, Connecticut, was more skeptical of Barnum’s political analysis. It noted that the Herald of Freedom, “if its prospectus is to be believed,” intended to “put down” the “Christian party in politics” or any who advocated a union of “Church and State.” The American Mercury shared that Barnum directed his wrath to all who may embrace “Superstition and Bigotry, Ignorance and Error, Hypocrisy and Fanaticism.” The review saved its most scathing remarks for Barnum's character. “We know nothing regarding his origin, nor shall we take the trouble to enquire.” The American Mercury advised Barnum that he avail himself of the Bethel school system and take lessons “in the science of manners.”

The review concluded with an observation that "Subsidiary to the great object, the Herald of Freedom will support the cause of ‘Jackson and Reform.’” President Andrew Jackson would be up for re-election the following year.

The Connecticut Mirror, also published in Hartford, expressed similar skepticism. The Mirror’s editor wrote, “Show us the evidence of the design, of any body of christians [sic] to unite Church and State—then we will assist the Editor of the Herald of Freedom in his efforts.” The Mirror opined that Barnum’s motives were only a disguised effort to “injure the fame and destroy the influence” of Rev. Dr. Ely of Philadelphia.

Rev. Dr. Ezra Stiles Ely was a noted Presbyterian minister, the editor of the religious newspaper The Philadelphian, and an advocate for the preservation of the church-state structure so opposed by Barnum. In an 1827 sermon, Ely preached that Christians should form a “union of church and state.” Calling for a “Christian party of politics” not memorialized in a legal constitution, but rather by the insistence “that all our rulers in their conduct shall conform to Christian morality.” If such conformance was not achieved, Ely argued, “it is a duty and privilege of Christian freeman to make a new and better election.”

The prospectus for the 1832 second volume of the Herald did not vary from the first. Just beneath an article advocating for Andrew Jackson for president, the prospectus read

For the second volume of The Herald of Freedom. Devoted to Liberal Principles in Religion and Politics, and of course, opposed to Priestcraft, Fanaticism, or Bigotry in the former (religion) and Antimasonry, Dr. Elyism, and any other kind of Federalism in the latter (politics). Devoted also to the News of the Day, Miscellaneous Reading, Literature, Etc. Etc.

== Structure of the Paper ==
Barnum’s four-page newspaper was not unlike other publications of its time. It contained a mix of news, paid advertisements, contributed and reprinted articles, letters, court notices, and the editor’s commentary.

The paper also contained notices of marriages, deaths, and occasionally a puzzle. “What must be the diameter in the bottom of a vessel, which is 10 feet high and 20 feet square, to discharge the vessel full of water in one hour?” Puzzle answers were published in the next issue.

Barnum also cultivated freelance correspondents to forward him stories. He reported, for example, on the expulsion of a member from a Baptist church in Utica, New York, “for repeated attempts on the chastity of several virtuous females.” From a contributor called Senex, Barnum reported that a Presbyterian clergyman spends hours with “his hired girl, three or four nights a week” after his wife has gone to bed. Senex also reported this same clergyman took his female converts “one at a time” to a secluded fishing spot “on an unfrequented road.” These embarrassing and titillating articles were designed to undermine cleric authority.

Barnum’s antipathy to orthodox religion was also on display in the Herald of Freedom’s regular articles. One such article, written by Thomas Cooper, M.D., President of South Carolina College, appeared on the front page of the Herald. Entitled “Appendix on the Clergy,” Cooper leveled a pointed charge against the “Presbyterians of these States, the Congregationalist, the Seceders” and “in some places, the Baptists, dragging after them the timid Episcopalians” for their attempts to create “an alliance between church and state.”

Barnum and Cooper shared a common interest in attacking Presbyterians for their resistance to a separation of church and state. These attacks were not without consequences. Cooper was forced to step down from the presidency of the South Carolina College (now the University of South Carolina) due to clashes with the Presbyterian church. Barnum would face several legal actions for his enthusiastic, if not ill-considered, attacks.

== Libel Charges ==
In retrospect, Barnum commented on the root cause of his legal woes during his editorship of the Herald of Freedom. Writing years later, he wrote

I entered upon the editorship of this journal with all the vigor and vehemence of youth. The boldness with which the paper was conducted soon excited wide-spread attention and commanded a circulation which extended beyond the immediate locality into nearly every State in the Union. But lacking that experience which induces caution, and without the dread of consequences, I frequently laid myself open to the charge of libel and three times in three years I was prosecuted.

The first libel suit was brought by a Danbury butcher and a zealous politician. Barnum accused him of being a spy in the Democratic caucus. An initial trial resulted without a finding, but Barnum was found guilty and fined several hundred dollars at a second trial.

Barnum’s second libel charge was filed by his uncle, former partner in Barnum’s lottery business, and one-time guardian, Alanson Taylor. Opponents of Barnum, deeming the editor of the Danbury Recorder, the paper that initially refused to print Barnum’s letter, too timid to respond to Barnum, replaced him with Taylor. Taylor changed the paper’s name to the Connecticut Repository and began his own heavy-handed attack against Barnum. Taylor’s leadership at the Connecticut Repository created its own backlash, with the Hartford Times observing it was “a most illiberal, jesuitical, and unfair paper.”

Barnum’s accusation that his uncle favored the union of church and state may not have been defamatory. Still, Barnum’s accusation that his uncle published criticism of him as “letters to the editor” under other names drew scrutiny. This second libel suit was withdrawn.

A third suit in 1832 had greater consequences for Barnum. Barnum was found to have libeled Seth Seeley, a Presbyterian church deacon, for accusing him of being a “canting” or righteous hypocrite and “guilty of taking usury of an orphan boy.” The case was based on the impolitic way Barnum charged Seeley for purchasing a note worth $42 for only $25 from an individual identified as an orphan.

Barnum recounted the charge in his paper.

We were tried before the Superior Court in this town on Thursday last, for an alleged libel against one Seth Seelye, a Presbyterian fanatic in Bethel, in which he was charged with inhumanly cheating a poor, lame, and destitute orphan boy out of $17.

Barnum portrayed his trial as proof that his warnings of a church-state alliance should be taken as a serious threat to liberty. He observed that the presiding judge, David Daggett, had recently converted to Presbyterianism. The Grand Juror, who entered the complaint on behalf of a “canting Presbyterian fanatic” (Seeley), was a Presbyterian. The verdict now “buried [him] alive in the gloomy walls of a prison” for nothing more than publishing “what we believed before God to be the truth.” Barnum claimed he had been “hunted down by Dr. Ely’s Christian Party in Politics.”

Barnum’s exaggerated lament, however, overshadowed other aspects of this church-state alliance that required reform. Lingering in the Connecticut legal system were provisions, colloquially referred to as “blue laws,” that enabled a civil libel case to be adjudicated in criminal court. Barnum’s opponent could thus prosecute his case against Barnum at state expense while Barnum incurred attorney fees.

Judge Daggett, the trial judge, held a particular bias against Barnum due to his Universalism. Just four years earlier, in 1828, while on the Connecticut Supreme Court bench, Daggett declared, ironically in a case involving usury, that testimony from a Universalist was inadmissible (Atwood v. Welton). Daggett claimed that Universalists were not trustworthy witnesses. He argued that if any person believed their “own happiness secure at death, regardless of his conduct in this life, he ought not to be sworn.”

Barnum was fined $100.00 and sentenced to sixty days imprisonment. Aside from Barnum’s lament of the “gloomy walls of a prison,” he was placed in a well-appointed cell where he received visitors, continued to run his paper, and upon release in early December, was accompanied by a parade of supporters on the three-mile trip from his cell to home.

== Merger with Gospel Witness ==
With Barnum’s sixty-day incarceration, he sought the assistance of another editor to publish his paper. On October 17, 1832, with the first issue of the second volume of the Herald of Freedom, it was published as a joint venture with the Gospel Witness.

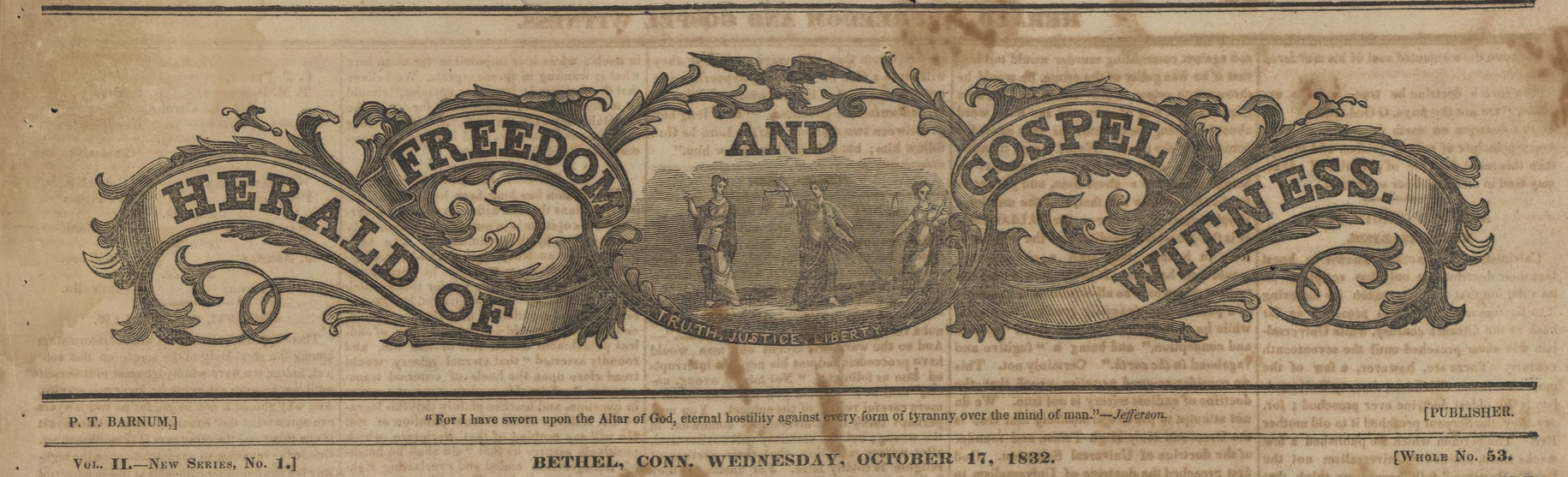
Newspaper banner for the first issue of the Herald of Freedom and Gospel Witness

Rev. L.F.W. Andrews had only begun publication of the Gospel Witness three months earlier in Hartford. In agreement with Barnum, Andrews ceased publication in Hartford and published the joint Herald of Freedom and Gospel Witness in Bethel.

Andrews, 27, had limited professional publishing experience. Prior to publishing the Gospel Witness, he had been the editor of the Hartford Inquirer for only ten weeks. However, he had been raised in a publishing family and apprenticed in his father’s newspaper business.

Andrews authored many of the articles in the paper, including a series of articles entitled “Proofs of Universalism.” He also published an exchange of letters between himself and his father. In those letters, Andrews’s father attempted, unsuccessfully, to dissuade his son from leaving the Presbyterian faith of his youth and converting to Universalism.

The combined Herald of Freedom and Gospel Witness continued to print articles critical of what it deemed the church-state elite. The response to an editorial by Alanson Taylor of the Connecticut Repository was covered in an article entitled “FRAUD! DECEPTION!! FALSEHOOD!!!” The same issue criticized Daggett’s judgment against Barnum as being based on “passions of malice and revenge.”

If there was an expectation among Barnum’s opponents that his conviction and incarceration would diminish the reach of his paper, they must have been disappointed. Although information on the number of papers printed is unavailable, an approximation of the paper’s circulation can be gleaned from its agent list. Agents were local individuals who sought subscriptions and payments on behalf of the paper. On December 12, 1832, the month Barnum was released from jail, the paper’s agent list had greatly expanded from 23 agents in four states to 85 agents in 15 states from Vermont to Florida.

Barnum and Andrews dissolved their joint publication in October 1833. Barnum then moved the paper to Danbury.

== Connection Ends with Herald of Freedom ==
In November 1834, after publishing 160 issues of The Herald of Freedom, Barnum passed control of the paper to his brother-in-law, John W. Amerman, who published the paper for another year in Norwalk, Connecticut. When Amerman sold the paper to Mr. George Taylor, the Barnum family’s connection to the Herald of Freedom ended.
