= Daniel Bragg Clayton =

American universalist minister (1817–1906)

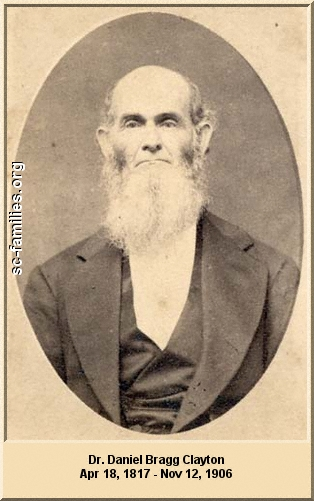
- Born: April 7, 1817; Sandy Ford, Spartanburg County, South Carolina, U.S.
- Died: November 12, 1906 (aged 89); Columbia, South Carolina
- Occupation: Minister
- Years active: 47
- Known for: Defense of Universalism
- Notable work: Forty-seven Years in the Universalist Ministry
- Religion: Universalism

Daniel Bragg Clayton, commonly known as D.B. Clayton (April 7, 1817 – November 12, 1906), was an American Southern Universalist minister who was instrumental in spreading and defending Universalism in the South. He was a self-taught scholar on the scriptural justification of universal salvation and frequently debated this theological topic with clergy of other denominations.

== Early life ==
Clayton was born on April 7, 1817, in Sandy Ford in the southwest corner of Spartanburg County (then known as Spartanburg District) near the Enoree River in South Carolina. Clayton was the elder of two children born to William Clayton (1791–1856) and Mary Newport Bragg (ca. 1795–1826).

Clayton's mother died three weeks after the birth of his brother, James W. Clayton (1826–1873). In 1827, his father married Elizabeth Brewton (1794–1858), a distant relation.

Clayton's father was a prosperous farmer who, by 1830, owned 12 slaves. In 1844, he moved from South Carolina to Red Banks in Marshall County in northern Mississippi on land recently occupied by the Chickasaw Nation. This land had become available to white settlers following the 1832 Treaty of Pontotoc Creek. Clayton's father continued to prosper, and by 1850, he had expanded his slave holdings to 22.

== Education ==
Clayton's formal education was brief, starting at age nine and lasted only six years. He attended school in a log cabin classroom staffed by a revolving set of traveling teachers. Nonetheless, he received a foundational education in reading, writing, arithmetic, geography, and surveying.

At the end of his formal schooling, Clayton continued his education through self-study, allowing him to earn a living as a traveling teacher. Several years later, Clayton again pursued a self-study program, this time to prepare himself for the Universalist ministry.

== Marriage and children ==
In 1838, Clayton, 21, married Rebecca Farrow (1821–1847), a member of Clayton's church community. Rebecca was four years Clayton's junior and gave birth to two sons Daniel Emmett (1842–1862) and William Perry (1845–1917). Their marriage ended in 1846 when Rebecca died.

Following the death of Rebecca, Clayton married Mary Amanda Rodgers (1825–1906) in 1848. That union resulted in seven children: Virgil Pingree (1849–1920), Calhoun (1852–1857), Mary Newport (1854–1902), Sallie (1855–1856), twins Rose Taylor (1860–1950), and Albert William (1860–1905) and Carrie Lee (1867–1899). Rodgers died in 1906 just a few months before Clayton's death.

== Early religious life ==
Located a mile from the Clayton family farmstead was the Bethel Baptist Church in Woodruff. The repeated preaching in this church of Adam's fall from grace and the Creator's subsequent threat of eternal damnation shaped the young Clayton. When a religious awakening swept his church in 1832, Clayton recollected that he "did not hesitate to regard the work then in progress as being due solely to the operation of God's unerring spirit of truth." However, the 15-year-old Clayton deemed his religious fervor wanting and sought the counsel of church elders. The elders assured him that he was not teetering on the precipice of hell and accepted his application for church membership. Yet, despite the elders' assurance, Clayton remained ill at ease with the church's Calvinistic teachings.

Those Calvinistic teachings taught God's sovereignty and the predestination of the elect to eternal happiness and the un-elected to endless torment. Clayton thought these teachings rendered God a "horrid monster of cruelty." Arminian teachings also unsettled Clayton. Although Arminianism provided people an opportunity to secure everlasting salvation, the frailties of human free will still left people prey to endless misery. Clayton rejected these conflicting intentions of God as errors in scriptural interpretation.

=== First steps toward Universalism ===
The Universalist periodicals in circulation in his hometown opened a theological alternative to Clayton. After reading a copy of the Evangelical Magazine and Gospel Advocate, devoted to "free inquiry" and "religious liberty," Clayton declared that he had been set free of "the shackles of religious error." A chance encounter in 1838 with Rev. Allen Fuller, a Massachusetts Universalist minister, would have an even more profound impact on Clayton's journey to Universalism.

Eight years earlier, Fuller had moved to South Carolina in response to a call from the state's fledgling Universalist community to support their cause. Like many Southern Universalist ministers, Fuller supplemented his ministerial income by farming. On that day, Fuller had come to Van Patton's Mill to have his wool processed. A well-known preacher, Fuller was asked and accepted a request to delay his return home and preached. Clayton, employed as a teacher, was also present at the mill.

Fuller's impromptu oration was the first Universalist sermon Clayton had ever heard. He was struck by the absence of the threats of hopeless misery in the afterlife he often heard at his Bethel Church. Instead, Fuller preached a message of a merciful and loving God. Clayton later referred to the sermon as manna for a hungry soul. Twenty years his senior, Fuller took the young Clayton on as his protégé. They remained close colleagues and friends until Fuller died in 1864.

These experiences did not immediately lead Clayton to pursue a career in the Universalist ministry. After his teaching position ended at Van Patton's Mill, he continued with secular employment as a clerk in Columbia, South Carolina. When he returned home, he resumed teaching.

=== Expulsion from Baptist Church ===
Once back home, the Bethel Baptist Church elders grew suspicious of Clayton's exploration of Universalism. They demanded to know if he had declared himself a Universalist. Clayton denied making such a declaration but admitted to considering that religious option. This inclination toward Universalism, a belief system the elders deemed heretical, was sufficient for the elders to seek the withdrawal of Clayton's church membership. Hoping to avoid an outright expulsion, Clayton asked if he could withdraw his membership. His request was denied, but the elders did note in their 1838 proceedings that Clayton was excommunicated "at his own request."

Freed from his formal membership in a Baptist church, Clayton embarked on a two-year course of study for the Universalist ministry. Since there were no nearby seminaries, Rev. Allen Fuller guided Clayton through his studies.

== Pre-Civil War Universalist Ministry ==
At the urging of Rev. Fuller, Clayton delivered his first Universalist sermon in 1841 in Greenville County, South Carolina. Fuller encouraged Clayton to continue preaching, and a few months later, Clayton delivered his next sermon. This sermon was a spontaneous oration, a characteristic style that would come to define Clayton's ministerial career as a staunch advocate of Universalism. The occasion of this impromptu sermon arose during an encounter with Rev. Warren Drummond, 20 years Clayton's senior. Drummond was preaching at the Antioch Baptist Church near Mountain Shoals, South Carolina, while the 23-year-old Clayton taught at a nearby schoolhouse. Seizing the opportunity of his proximity to Drummond, Clayton mounted a tree stump midway between the church and schoolhouse, boldly declaring, "My friends, if any three men of this congregation will listen to me . . ."

A crowd gathered and Clayton proceeded to offer a scriptural defense of salvation for all. Rev. Drummond had not left the meetinghouse to listen to Clayton. Rather he sat before his pulpit and sang at the top of his voice hoping, to no avail, to bring his folk back into the meetinghouse. Only upon the end of the allotted 30 minutes for the recess, Clayton ceased preaching, and the people returned to the meetinghouse. .

=== South Carolina ===
Although Clayton had inaugurated his ministerial career in 1841, he preached only sporadically for the next three years. He devoted his time to teaching and continuing his Universalist studies. He maintained his involvement with South Carolina's Universalist community by attending Universalist state conventions from 1842 to 1845.

In 1844, the Universalist State Convention approached Clayton and asked him to become its circuit rider. Citing his intention to move to Mississippi to join his father, Clayton declined the offer. However, when Clayton's wife fell ill, he postponed his move to Mississippi and accepted the convention's circuit rider position. During his year of service in 1845, he delivered monthly sermons at the meetinghouses in Feasterville, Huntsville, Partlow, Fredonia, and Hartford.

With Clayton now actively engaged in the Universalist ministry, Revs. Allen Fuller and C.F.R. Shehane, a former Campbellite who converted to Universalism, ordained Clayton at the 1845 Universalist State Convention held at Partlow's meetinghouse.

After fulfilling his circuit-riding duties in South Carolina, Clayton embarked on a two-month circuit ride of Georgia in the spring of 1846. His serpentine route through the state was formed by invitations he had received to preach and his desire to visit acquaintances. Clayton resumed his postponed plans to move to Mississippi in July that year. During his journey from South Carolina, Clayton attended the Georgia State Universalist Convention in Marietta, about 25 miles northwest of Atlanta. At this convention, Clayton met William Coleman who suggested hosting a future convention on his property in Cuthbert, Georgia. Originally from South Carolina, William Coleman's family had been founding members of that state's Universalist convention.

=== Mississippi ===
On his father's plantation in Marshall County in northern Mississippi, Clayton no longer had access to a ministerial support system of a Universalist state convention. Unlike Georgia and South Carolina, Mississippi did not yet have such a structure. However, Universalism was not unknown in Mississippi. In 1836, an Ohioan Universalist minister, Rev. George Rogers, traveled to Mississippi and delivered sermons in Salem, Spring Hill, and Ripley in neighboring Tippah County. Although eight years had passed since Rogers' last visit, Clayton began a once-a-month preaching circuit in Salem and Spring Hill. He also used opportunities to preach during his secular travels as a merchant.

Although Clayton reprised his South Carolina circuit-riding preaching style in Salem and Spring Hill, there were no formally organized Universalist societies in those towns that could raise subscriptions to pay for his services. However, the more pressing challenge facing Clayton in raising Universalist societies in northern Mississippi was the lack of a critical mass of Universalist families. Traditionally, Universalist societies were formed by related families bringing their Universalist faith to an emerging agrarian community. Even where Universalists gathered, such as Spring Hill, there was a lack of the ability, or willingness, to raise the subscription for his services. Nevertheless, Clayton continued to provide his once-a-month circuit-riding service to both towns for a year.

Clayton temporarily suspended his preaching services in Mississippi following the death of his wife Rebecca in September 1847. He then embarked on a three-month trip to Alabama where he grieved and occasionally preached whenever a door "was opened to him." On his return to Mississippi in early 1848, Clayton resumed his circuit riding duties. He also extended his itinerant preaching services to southern Tennessee.

Clayton traveled outside Mississippi again when he accepted an invitation to preach at the 1850 Georgia Universalist State Convention. The invitation was extended by William Coleman, whom Clayton had met years earlier on his initial travels to Mississippi. During his travels from his home in Red Banks, Mississippi, Clayton preached at a number of locations in Mississippi including Holly Springs, Ripley, Pontotoc, Aberdeen, and Columbus, the Universalist society at Troup Factory, Georgia as well as cities in Alabama.

During his stop in Notasulga, Alabama, Clayton preached a sermon “replete with the life and energy of the Gospel” for the dedication of the new Universalist society in that town. It was at this dedication that Clayton had another chance encounter that would result in a lifelong friendship. That chance encounter was with Rev. John Burruss from Alabama, the young 28-year-old editor of The Universalist Herald.

At the Georgia State Convention, Clayton delivered the dedication sermon for the new Universalist meetinghouse Coleman recently built, at his own expense, on his plantation in Cuthbert, Randolph County, Georgia.

== Widening gap between Northern and Southern Universalists ==
Northern Universalists, watching destructive divisions in other denominations over slavery, remained cautious on the subject. That caution was abandoned in 1840 with the convening of the Universalist Anti-Slavery Convention in Lynn, Massachusetts. Three years later, the General Universalist Convention accelerated the denomination's campaign against slavery by issuing official resolutions condemning the institution. Any hope that Southern Universalists could influence the denomination's position on slavery was dashed a decade later. In 1854, a new formula for allocating delegate voting status at the annual general assembly was adopted, relegating the South to permanent minority status. The new formula heavily favored established Universalist societies in the northeast. New York state alone, for example, had 213 societies, 172 meetinghouses, and 123 preachers, while the combined total from all Southern States was 11 societies, 53 meetinghouses, and 21 preachers.

=== Southern General Convention ===
Sensing their isolation, attendees at the 1854 Georgia Universalist State Convention unanimously resolved to "disclaim having any connection with Universalists of the North." The convention attendees further resolved that they would no longer send delegates “to any free State in the Union, nor will we receive any from such States to the Southern Convention.” Southern Universalists then moved forward with plans to organize a separate, independent, and multi-state Universalist body to be known as the Southern General Convention to represent their collective interests.

Four years later, this desire for a collective Southern representative organization was realized. Universalist preachers from Alabama, Georgia, Mississippi, and North Carolina gathered in Feasterville, South Carolina, on August 3, 1858, and drafted the constitution of the Southern General Convention. Later that same year, the Georgia Universalist State Convention, now a central gathering place for Southern Universalists, considered the ratification of the constitution of the Southern General Convention.

Clayton along with Rev. Allen Fuller and Rev. John Burruss both from Alabama and six Georgia ministers were present when the Georgia Universalist State Convention convened in September in Plains of Dura. The debate on the constitution of the Southern General Convention “elicited considerable discussion, pro and con.” Once the clause stating that the Southern General Convention was subordinate to the U.S. General Convention of Universalists was removed, the constitution was ratified. A month later, Rev. S.J. McMorris who supported the insertion of this clause at the original drafting in Feasterville, recanted his support. Stating in a published letter in The Universalist Herald, “The Universalists of the South, must withdraw from the control of that body (U.S. General Convention of Universalists), or they will be branded with its abolition sentiments.”

Two years later, this new Southern General Convention body was recognized in the 1860 edition of the Universalist Companion, the official almanac and register of Universalist ministers and institutions.

Writing his autobiography thirty-one years later, Clayton did not mention the debate on the Southern General Convention. Rather Clayton observed that the convention's one decision of “incalculable benefit” was to raise twenty-five thousand dollars to fund a Denominational High School in Georgia. A committee was established to raise the funds and Clayton was appointed the General Agent.

Clayton was again present at the 1859 Georgia Universalist State Convention held at the Friendship Church in Dawson County. Clayton, who had become a leader among Southern Universalists, offered the opening prayer and provided one of the sermons at the convention. As the General Agent for raising funds for the denominal school, he reported disappointing results. He shared that less than half of the projected funds had been raised.

The following year, Clayton attended his final meetings with Southern Universalists before the outbreak of the Civil War. In 1860, he attended both South Carolina's Universalist State Convention in Feasterville and North Carolina's Universalist State Convention held in William's Church, Pitt County. The North Carolina convention also included a convening of the Southern General Convention.

All efforts by Southern Universalists to establish a singular Southern identity, a collective Southern General Convention, or a denominational school soon became moot with the outbreak of the Civil War (1861-1865).

== Civil War years ==
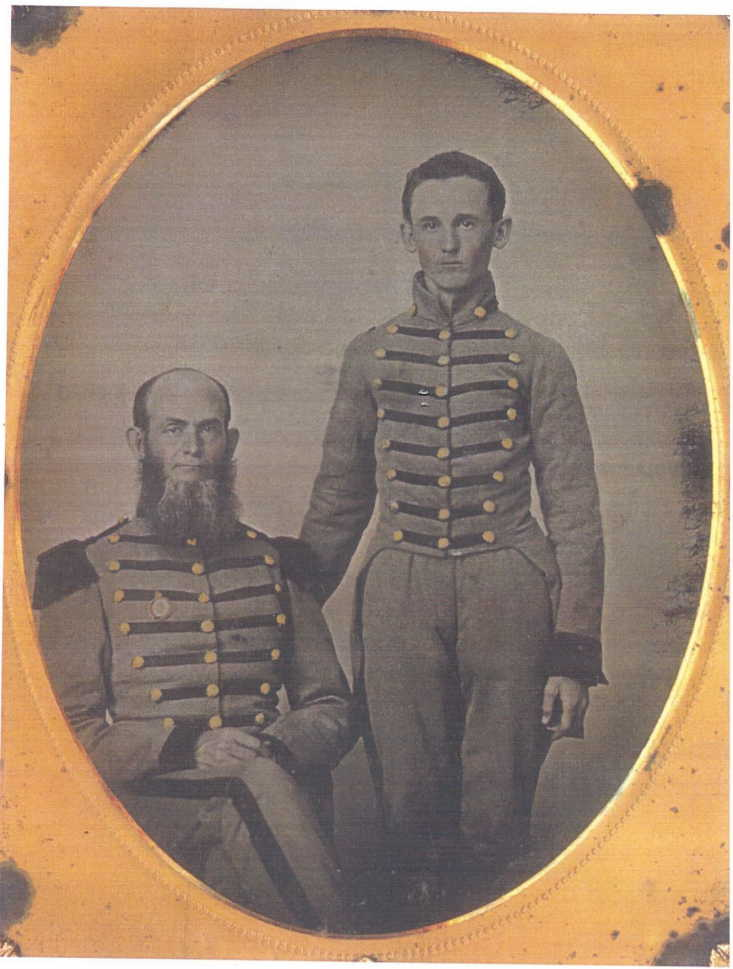
D.B. Clayton and son Daniel Emmett in Confederate Uniforms

D.B. Clayton and his son Daniel Emmett enlisted as privates in the Jeff Davis Rifles and the Confederate Home Guard in February 1861. The Ninth Mississippi Regiment later incorporated their company and deployed them to Pensacola, Florida in April 1861.

Clayton, then 44 years old, did not fare well during the five and a half months he spent in the Florida camp. Suffering from dysentery and other diseases, he secured a substitute to complete his enlistment. His son, Daniel Emmett, continued his military service but did not survive the war. He was killed in action on December 25, 1862.

Following his military discharge, Clayton returned home to Holly Springs, Mississippi. In December 1861, he was present when Union soldiers ransacked and burned several Holly Springs homes, including his own. Nonetheless, Clayton remained in Mississippi for two additional years and then returned to South Carolina. There he secured a teaching position at the Feasterville Academy on the same grounds as the Liberty Universalist Church.

The income from teaching, however, proved insufficient to support his family. For the next five years, Clayton's employment was sporadic. He preached once a month at the Liberty Universalist Church, traveled from town to town repairing clocks, managed a general merchandise store, and owned a small mercantile business. He even resumed itinerant preaching, although he noted he had "received not a single dollar of pecuniary compensation" for his preaching efforts. In early 1868, he left Feasterville and moved his family to Columbia, South Carolina.

== Post Civil War ministry ==
After the Civil War, Southern Universalist societies which were generally dependent on the agricultural economy were devastated. In his October 30, 1870, report to the Universalist Register, Clayton commented on the state of Universalism in South Carolina, "I cannot say there is an organized church or society in the State."

By 1871, his personal finances had sufficiently improved allowing him to resume his circuit riding ministry. The South itself was also recovering. Previously, Clayton traveled by buggy or horseback. He now traveled by railroad or steamboat. His ministry expanded by thousands of miles each year to include North Carolina, South Carolina, Georgia, Mississippi, Alabama, West Tennessee, and Texas. From 1885 to 1888, he recorded in his autobiography that he traveled 47,865 miles. He continued his circuit riding ministry until he died in 1906.

=== North Carolina ===
Clayton's North Carolina circuit included Kenansville, Woodington, Magnolia, and Red Hill.

Kenansville, in Duplin County, is sometimes called the "cradle of Universalism" in Eastern North Carolina. It was in Kenansville in 1827 that Rev. Jacob Frieze, a northern Universalist minister, organized North Carolina's Universalists in the short-lived and ambitiously named Southern Convention of Universalists. Frieze's organization of North Carolina's Universalists did not persist long after his return to the North, but his efforts did live on in another form. Three years later, in 1830, Universalists in neighboring South Carolina organized their state Universalist convention, incorporating the language of Frieze's North Carolina constitution, almost word for word into their state constitution. Rev. Edwin H. Lake reorganized the society in 1858 and Clayton again in 1872.

Woodington (also Woodenton) in Lenoir County is sometimes called the "Mother Church" of North Carolina. The Woodington Society guided the early members of Outlaws Bridge, Kinston, Rocky Mount, and Greensboro. Clayton reorganized this society in 1872. By 1889, its membership approached 100. In 1901, the church was dedicated as the Clayton Memorial Church.

Magnolia in Duplin County was the home of the Rev. Edwin H. Lake. Lake was a northern Universalist minister who moved before the Civil War to the South for health reasons. Clayton and Lake met at the 1860 South Carolina State Universalist Convention and developed a friendship that lasted until Lake's death in 1862. In 1897, the Magnolia society honored Clayton when they organized their society as the Clayton Memorial Church, listing him as their pastor. Clayton dedicated the church building and occasionally preached there for the next two years.

Red Hill in Sampson County, also known as Taylor's Bridge, underwent numerous reorganizations from 1827 to 1885, with Clayton reorganizing the society in 1885. Clayton frequently visited the Red Hill church and was present when North Carolina's Universalists reorganized their Universalist State Convention at the Red Hill church in 1896.

=== South Carolina ===
Although Clayton lived in South Carolina for most of his post-war ministry, he did relatively little preaching in the state. He returned to Feasterville in 1877, his home during the war, and reorganized the Liberty Universalist Church. Six years later, the church had 35 members and an active Sunday school, with Clayton preaching there six to eight times a year.

In 1905, South Carolina's Universalists honored Clayton shortly before his death when neighboring Universalists in Newberry named their church the Clayton Memorial Church.

=== Georgia ===
Although Clayton's circuit included the state's small rural Universalist societies, he also participated in an effort to establish an urban Universalist society. In 1880, Clayton assisted Rev. William Clayton Bowman (also known as W.C. Bowman), a former North Carolina Methodist minister, in raising a Universalist society in Atlanta. Bowman, who had arrived a year earlier, invited Clayton to deliver a series of sermons and defenses of Universalism. Bowman also solicited Clayton's assistance in publishing a weekly Universalist periodical called the Atlanta Universalist. Although Clayton considered Bowman's periodical an ill-advised financial adventure, he agreed to help.

The burdens of the society's ministry and publication of the periodical soon fell to Clayton when Bowman resigned in October 1880 both as the pastor and editor of The Atlanta Universalist. Realizing that the church and the periodical were unsustainable, Clayton closed the church and ceased publication of the Atlanta Universalist in the summer of 1882. He sold the paper's subscription list to Rev. John Burruss of The Universalist Herald. In 1883, Clayton returned to South Carolina.

=== Mississippi ===
A Universalist society had been founded around 1846 near Louisville in Winston County by members of the Coleman family who had migrated west from South Carolina. In 1859, the inaugural meeting of the Mississippi State Universalist Convention was held in the Louisville church. Clayton, who was attending the Georgia State Convention, did not attend this meeting.

Nearly 20 years elapsed from the close of the Civil War before Clayton returned to preach at this Winston County church. He then frequently traveled the 160 miles from his home in Red Banks in northern Mississippi to Winston County. Once back on his ministerial circuit, the Winston church commanded a great deal of Clayton's attention. He noted in his autobiography that of the 81 places where he delivered sermons from 1885 to 1888, he visited the Winston church 43 times. In 1885, Clayton reorganized the society in Louisville as the Liberty Universalist Church. It is not coincidental that the societies in Louisville, Mississippi and Feasterville, South Carolina are both named Liberty Universalist Church, as they are connected to the Coleman family and Clayton.

== Secular pursuits ==
Although Clayton was active in the Universalist ministry for most of his life, he earned a living primarily through his secular skills.

=== Writer ===
Although Clayton was a regular contributor to The Universalist Herald, he did not, like many of his contemporary Universalist ministers, produce a body of work in the form of pamphlets and books that he regularly sold to supplement his income. He did sell his documented debates with orthodox ministers. It wasn't until 1889, at age 72, that he penned his autobiography, Forty-Seven Years in the Universalist Ministry.

=== Newspaper publisher ===
Before he enlisted in the Confederate Army, Clayton published various newspapers. Although he applied his zeal to these endeavors, none of his publications flourished. Years later, in his autobiography, Clayton reflected that the editing of newspapers was a “profession for which he had considerable taste, if but little aptitude.”

In August 1853, two years after arriving in Aberdeen, Mississippi, Clayton purchased The Monroe Democrat. Founded in 1848, the paper had long been the standard bearer for Monroe County Democrats. At the time Clayton purchased the paper both the newspaper and the county's Democrats were in disarray. The newspaper had undergone several ownership changes and the county's Democrats were publicly feuding over which candidate to put forward to fill a newly opened House of Representative seat made possible by Mississippi's population growth as recorded in the 1850 U.S. Census.

Two Democratic candidates were embroiled in what was known as the “Chickasaw Rebellion.” The state's Democrats selected William Barksdale as their standard bearer at the party's convention. Democrats, who had settled in lands formerly occupied by the Chickasaw Nation, “rebelled” and insisted on their choice, Reuben Davis. Clayton and The Monroe Democrat backed Barksdale.

Following Barksdale's victory, Clayton wrote in his paper, “When we took charge of [The Monroe] Democrat three months ago the prospects for a Democrat triumph in Monroe was gloomy indeed.” Clayton then spoke of the role his paper played in healing dissensions within the Democratic Party and in its vanquishing of the Whig Party's attempt to “cram Whig principles, coated over with a plaster of ‘glorious Union,’ down the throats of Democrats.”

A year later, in early 1855, Clayton began publishing another newspaper in Aberdeen known as The Independent Miscellany. Clayton and Thomas Bibb Bradley, a well-known Southern poet, were listed as managing editors of the paper that focused on Southern literature and interests. Within a year, Bradley was gone and the paper repositioned itself as an organ for an “open and free discussion of all subjects in which mankind are interested.” Clayton departed Aberdeen in 1856 and it appears that both newspapers, The Monroe Democrat and The Independent Miscellany, then ceased publication.

Clayton returned to northern Mississippi, settling in Holly Springs. There Clayton became the editor of a weekly newspaper called The Marshall Democrat. Clayton discontinued the paper sometime before January 1860, selling the press, type, and other materials to S.L. Whittington, who then started The Democratic Star. A year later, Whittington discontinued The Democratic Star and began publication of another paper called The Independent South. The publishers listed D.B. Clayton as the editor. Clayton was still the editor when he and his son Daniel Emmett enlisted in the Jeff Davis Rifles and Home Guards in April 1861.

As noted earlier, after the Civil War, Clayton briefly returned to publishing the short-lived Atlanta Universalist newspaper.

=== Hotel proprietor ===
For nearly 12 years Clayton and his wife were the proprietors of a hotel in Columbia, South Carolina. As a proprietor, he had his share of successes and failures. This post-Civil War venture began in 1868 when Clayton left Feasterville and moved to Columbia, South Carolina. He purchased a hotel previously known as the Shriver House and opened this renovated establishment as the Central Hotel. The Central Hotel was successful, attracting more guests during the 1872 State Fair than any of Columbia's other hotels. Clayton also invested in the new and emerging technology of commercial ice making. He supplied his hotel customers with ice and generated additional demand by advertising to the townspeople to come to his icehouse around dinner time and buy an ice-chilled watermelon for dessert.

Clayton's efforts to expand his hospitality business were less successful. An adventure with one of his sons in mid-1872 in Cherokee Springs near Spartanburg, 100 miles north of his Central Hotel, was closed within a year. In April 1873, he again attempted to expand his hospitality accommodations by purchasing the Walker House in Spartanburg. The renovated property, renamed the Piedmont House, opened in August 1873 and closed a few months later. Clayton claimed the property was now available to any man who "can keep a hotel."

== Defense of Universalism ==
Most notable in Clayton's ministerial career was his avid defense of Universalism. His strategy relied on a skillfully assembled body of scriptural texts or proof. He also drew upon scriptural interpretations from Klein-Nicolai's Everlasting Gospel. Originally published in Germany in 1705 under the pseudonym of Paul Siegvolck, Klein-Nicolai reasoned that errors in biblical scholarship incorrectly condemned souls to perpetual damnation. He argued that the translation of the Hebrew words adon olam and the Greek word aion did not mean "eternal." The correct translation, it was argued, was only a reference to a limited unit of time. Klein-Nicolai further argued that sin was finite, not infinite, and could not incur the wrath of endless punishment.

Clayton was not alone in advancing such arguments. Rev. Elhanan Winchester, a noted Universalist Restorationist of the late 18th century, also advanced Klein-Nicolai's ideas.

Clayton did not shy away from engaging in what he called “theological combat.” Southern orthodox ministers, on the other hand, shunned being seen in a public debate with a minister representing a religion considered heretical. Not surprisingly, Clayton employed several techniques to initiate a public debate. With the Baptist minister Rev. Drummond, he spontaneously mounted a tree stump and called for anyone to “listen to me.” With Rev. Cato, a Presbyterian minister, Clayton patiently listened to Cato's sermon and afterward called all to join him the next day in his rebuke of Cato's depiction of Universalism. Clayton also engaged in more formally organized debates, such as with Rev. J.J. Sledge, a Missionary Baptist, in a multi-day formal debate. Clayton's debate with Rev. W.J. Scott, a Methodist minister, was published in Georgia newspapers.

Aside from defending Universalism at a scriptural level, Clayton faced two wider charges orthodox ministers leveled against his religion. The first charge was that Universalism, with its promise of eternal salvation, removed the threat of God's eternal damnation for sin. Without this threat, orthodox ministers warned, lawlessness, licentiousness, and depravity would surely run unchecked. Clayton stressed that God's afterlife plan was to remove, not punish sin. Regarding the alleged lawlessness that a Universalist would bring about, Clayton coyly observed that no Universalists could be found in the state's penitentiary while offering a roster of the orthodox clergy sitting in the state's prisons.

The second charge broadly leveled against Universalists was that since they did not believe in the Trinity they were not Christians. Clayton countered that Christianity must be based on scripture and that there was no scriptural support for the Trinity in the Bible.

Clayton was also assailed for holding radical Universalist views more commonly associated with Northern Universalists. Those views were embodied by Rev. Hosea Ballou known as an "ultra-Universalist.” Ballou argued that a loving God never intended to condemn any of his creations and that only eternal happiness and holiness awaited all without any intervening punishment. Clayton was not an ultra-Universalist. He held restorationist views. “I neither affirm nor believe, that a single soul which God has made, will ever be taken to Heaven with the least taint of moral pollution appertains to it.” He argued that God's afterlife plan included a purification to remove any taint of sin from a soul prior to entering heaven. He likened God's plan to a metal refiner who “burns away” an ore's impurities (e.g., sins), leaving only the pure metal (e.g., the cleansed soul).

=== Debates ===
Of his many debates, only three are documented. His 1853 debate with Rev. J.J. Sledge, a Missionary Baptist minister at the Pleasant Grove Church in Red Banks, Mississippi was published as a book, A Theological Discussion: Between D. B. Clayton and J. J. Sledge; Held at Pleasant Grove Church, Marshall County, Miss. on the 3d, 4th, 5th and 6th Days of August,1853.

His 1859 debate with Rev. W. J. Scott, a Methodist minister in Sumter County, Georgia, was conducted via the newspaper from June to October. Originally published in The Sumpter Republican in Americus, Georgia, L.F.W. Andrews later republished the debate in the Georgia Citizen in Macon. Andrews was a Universalist preacher and prolific publisher of Universalist and secular periodicals.

His 1887 debate with Rev. J.N. Hall which took place in Glimp, Tennessee was published in The Universalist Herald and was included as an appendix in his autobiography.

== Death ==
While preparing for a trip to North Carolina to visit his daughter, D.B. Clayton died suddenly on November 12, 1906, in Columbia, South Carolina. He was at the home of William P. Clayton, his second son. His son explained that he stooped to pick up a valise and died of a stroke. He was 89 years old. His wife of 58 years, Mary Amanda (née) Rodgers, had died seven months earlier. They are buried in the Elmwood Memorial Garden in Spartanburg, South Carolina.

Clayton, often called Father Clayton, was an indefatigable preacher and defender of Universalism. In the 1907 Universalist Register, his obituary reads in part, “Father Clayton's life was one of ardent service and true self-denial. He lived for a cause, and that cause was the emancipation of humanity from error and sin. He was surely guided by the spirit of the Master, going about doing good.”

Yet, despite the many years of dedicated service in the spread of Universalism, little is known of Clayton today. Once, several small rural Universalist societies were named in his honor. Today only the Clayton Memorial Church in Newberry, South Carolina bears his name.
