= Rockwell Universalist Church =

Historic church in Georgia, United States

- U.S. National Register of Historic Places
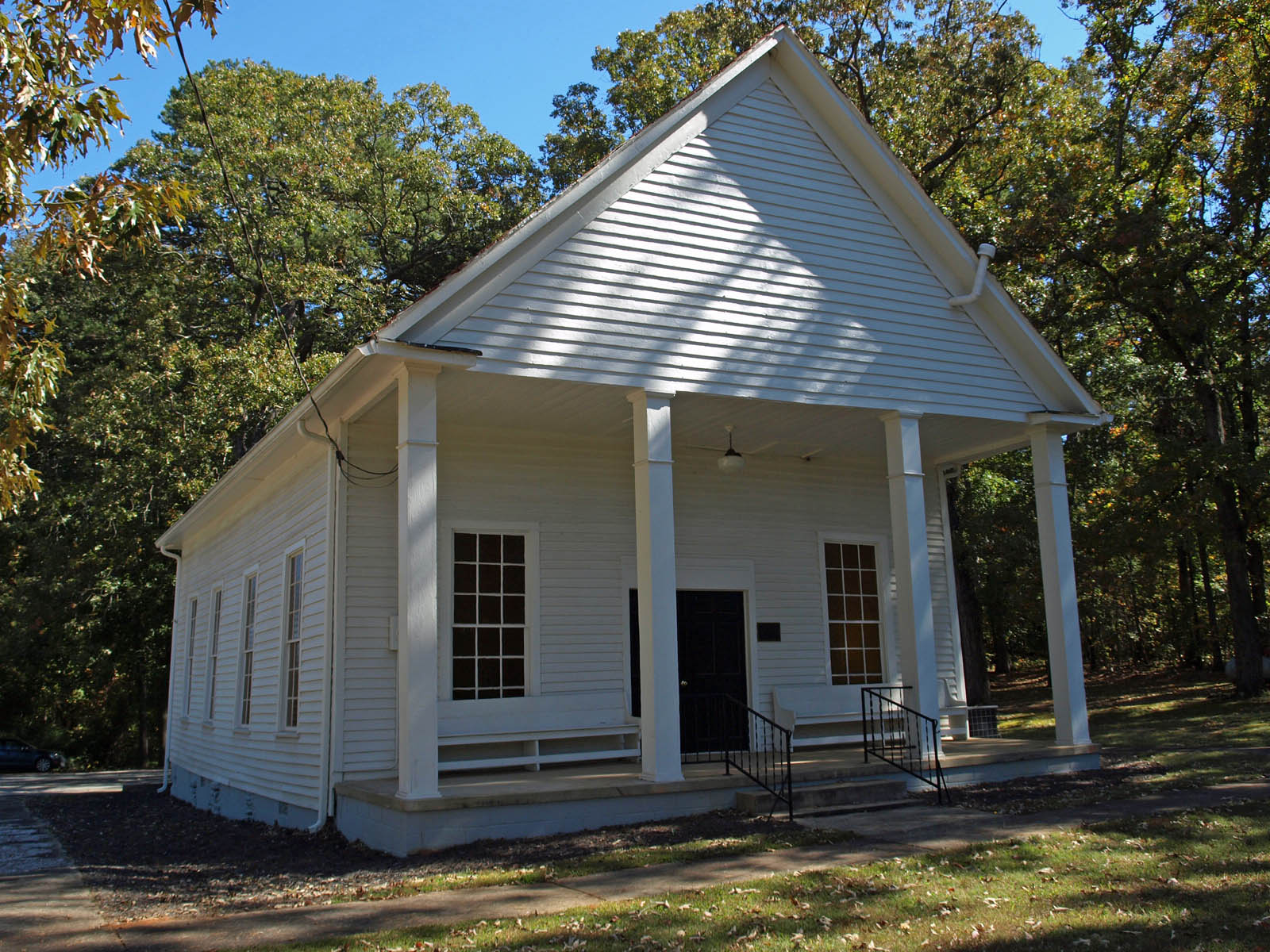

- Location within Georgia Location within the United States
- Nearest city: Winder, Georgia
- Coordinates: 34°2′7″N 83°42′49″W
- Area: 2 acres (0.81 ha)
- Built: 1881
- Architectural style: Greek Revival
- NRHP reference No.: 85000933
- Added to NRHP: May 2, 1985

The Rockwell Universalist Church near Winder, Georgia is a rural church built in 1881 in simple Greek Revival style.

It was listed on the National Register of Historic Places (NRHP) in 1985. It was deemed architecturally significant as a "good example" of its type of post-Civil War rural churches, being a one-room wood-frame church with no ornamentation and Greek Revival styling. It was also deemed significant as one of few Universalist churches ever to exist in the State of Georgia. Its NRHP nomination posits that Universalists, though the fifth largest religious denomination in the U.S. before the American Civil War, "did not prosper in Georgia due to their lack of organization and official discipline...[they] were overwhelmed by the popularity of the Baptists and Methodists who comprised over 90 percent of those identifying church affiliation in 1850 in Georgia."
