= Liberty Universalist Church and Feasterville Academy Historic District =

Historic church in South Carolina, United States

- U.S. National Register of Historic Places
- U.S. Historic district
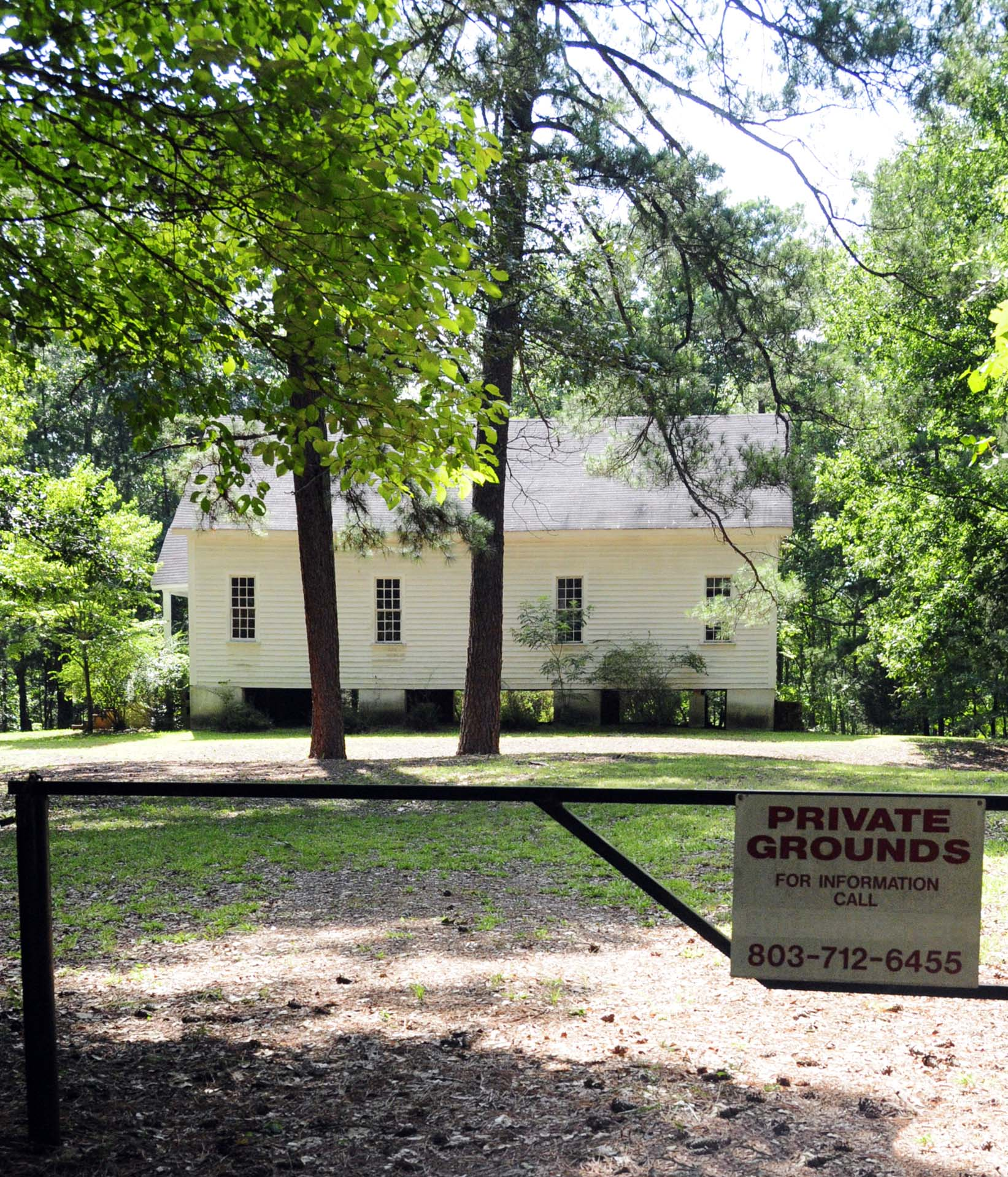

- Location within South Carolina Location within the United States
- Location: South Carolina Highway 215, near Winnsboro, South Carolina
- Coordinates: 34°30′13″N 81°21′36″W
- Area: 8.3 acres (3.4 ha)
- Built: 1832
- MPS: Fairfield County MRA
- NRHP reference No.: 84000612
- Added to NRHP: December 6, 1984

Liberty Universalist Church and Feasterville Academy Historic District is a national historic district located near Winnsboro, Fairfield County, South Carolina. The property encompasses four buildings constructed between 1831 and 1845. They are the Liberty Universalist Church and three buildings associated with the Academy: a boarding house, a kitchen, and a school building. The buildings were constructed by the Feaster family.

The Feaster family followed the family patriarch Andrew Feaster when he migrated from Lancaster County in eastern Pennsylvania to the Beaver Creek area in Fairfield County, South Carolina. In South Carolina, the Feasters were active in religious activities, first with the German Baptist Brethren and later with Christian Universalists. When Andrew Feaster died in 1821, his son John became the family patriarch. John Feaster oversaw the construction of the buildings now included in the national historic district.

The construction of the church building in 1831 coincided with the formation of the South Carolina Convention of Universalists in November 1830. The academy buildings were constructed in 1845 as a commercial enterprise to provide educational facilities to area residents. The school has alternately been referred to as an "academy", "female seminary" and "boarding house". The grounds and buildings continue to be used for private yearly family reunions.

The Historic District and related buildings were added to the National Register of Historic Places in 1984.

== Family background ==
Andrew Feaster (1735–1821) was born in the Canton of Bern, Switzerland, and immigrated to America in 1754. The 19-year-old Feaster immigrated with his father, Peter Pfister (1700–1775), and perhaps with other relatives. They settled in Lancaster County, Pennsylvania. For decades, Lancaster County was a destination for German-speaking immigrants. A significant percentage of those settling in the area were German Baptists or related sects such as the Schwenkfelders, Moravians, Mennonites, Quakers and Amish.

=== Marriage and children ===
The public record for Andrew Feaster is silent for more than a decade after his arrival in America. In 1767, he married Margaret Frie (alternatively, Fry) Cooper. Frie had previously been married to Peter Cooper, whom she married in 1757 in Philadelphia. Cooper died in 1766. Based on family genealogical records, four children were born into the Cooper–Frie marriage: Adam (1755–1835), Peter (b. 1762), Eve (b. 1761), and Elizabeth Keiffer (b. 1766). Feaster had also been previously married and brought one child, Martha (1766–1866), into his marriage with Frie. To the Feaster–Fries, six children were born: John (1768–1848), Susannah (1769–1829), Margaret (1770–1825), Andrew (1777–1808), Alice (1781–1830), and Jacob (1791–1872).

=== Migration to South Carolina ===
Daniel Bragg Clayton, in his 1889 autobiography Forty-seven Years in the Universalist Ministry, observed that Feaster arrived in South Carolina after the birth of his sons John and Andrew. Etta A. Rosson, in her paper The Feasters (Pfister) and Feasterville, argues that the Feasters initially migrated to Georgia. She cites a 1774 petition by Andrew Feaster for a land grant in Wilkes County, Georgia. Due to pressure from local Native Americans, Feaster left his Georgia land grants and relocated to South Carolina. Feaster and his family arrived in Beaver Creek along the Broad River in Fairfield County, South Carolina, in the late 1770s.

=== Religious background ===
The Feasters were commonly referred to as Dunkards. In a personal reflection about Feaster and other early settlers in the Beaver Creek area printed in 1880 in a local newspaper, an author writes, "[They] were called Dunkards and were the only men seen with unshaven faces." Dunkards, also referred to as Tunkers or First Day Baptists, are connected to the Schwarzenau Brethren, a denomination that emerged from the Anabaptist movement in Germany, founded by Alexander Mack in 1708. The Brethren adopted the practice of adult baptism, in contrast to infant baptism, employing a three-time immersion method, which facilitated the origin of the term "Dunkards". In 1723, Peter Becker established the first Brethren Society in Germantown, Pennsylvania. The society has subsequently been known as the Fraternity of German Baptists, German Baptists, or the Church of the Brethren.

== Evolution: Brethren to Universalist ==
Approximately 60 years after Andrew Feaster's death, D. B. Clayton noted that Feaster and his son, John, preached the concept of salvation for all within their Dunkard church. The Brethren were characterized as devout and pious, with some members potentially holding private beliefs in universal salvation. Roger E. Sappington, in his book the Brethren in the Carolinas, remarked that the Brethren's focus on the New Testament and the depiction of God's love through Jesus may have made them susceptible to the influences of Universalism. The preaching of universal salvation, however, was not generally part of Brethren religious practices. Nonetheless, from 1780 to 1830, three preachers, David Martin, Giles Chapman, and Elijah Linch, moved the Feasters and their Brethren neighbors to Universalism.

=== David Martin ===
In 1754, David Martin (1737–1794), a minister of the Brethren faith, arrived in South Carolina. Morgan Edwards, a Baptist historian, provided a first-hand account in 1772 of Martin's activities, noting that although he did not have a meetinghouse, his Beaver Creek Brethren congregation comprised 25 families and 50 baptized members. Edwards describes Martin as having "excellent character" and being "facetious and devout at the same time." He also documented Martin's early years of preaching in the Beaver Creek area. "About the year 1748 Michael Millers, Jacob Canomore, Laurence Free, with their wives arrived from Conneocoheague; some years later after came Rev. George Martin and wife, and Hans Waggoner and wife; these united in communion in July 1759 and increased fast partly by baptism and partly by emigration. Their minister is Rev. David Martin." Martin additionally preached to non-German-speaking settlers, forming a congregation of English Dunkers and Seventh Day Baptists in the Clouds Creek area. Martin also organized a Brethren Society on the Edisto River with 16 baptized members from eight families.

Thomas Whittemore, in The History of Universalism in America, offered that around 1780, Martin was led to doubt the validity of the doctrine of endless punishment by the works of the English clergyman William Law. Martin may have also been moved by a local Universalist influence by the preaching of Elhanan Winchester. Winchester, who would later become a leading voice in Christian Universalism, was the pastor of the Welsh Neck Baptist Church during 1775–1779 on the Pee Dee River in South Carolina. Winchester dropped the Calvinist doctrine of election from the church's creed. Despite resistance to the message of universal salvation from the Brethren leadership and local churches, from 1780 until his death in 1794, David Martin gradually turned the Brethren to the adoption of universal salvation.

=== Giles Chapman ===
Giles Chapman (1748–1819) was born in Newberry District, South Carolina, in 1748. His parents had arrived in America from Bridlington, England, in 1725 and first settled in Virginia. They later migrated to South Carolina. Chapman married Mary Summers, the daughter of Joseph Summers. Both the Summers and Chapmans were notable Dunkard families in the Newberry area. John Belton O’Neall, a contemporary of Chapman, wrote, "He began to preach in 1782. Often have I heard his discourses. He was beyond all doubt an eloquent and a gifted preacher; and seemed to me to be inspired with a full portion of the holy and divine spirit, which taught ‘God is Love.’" Although Martin and Chapman preached universal salvation, they and their Dunkard followers did not consider themselves Universalists, per se.

=== Elijah Linch ===
In 1794, when Elijah Linch (1773-1842) (alternatively Lynch) united himself with the Dunkards in the Newberry District, he did so as a Universalist, being the last member to be received with the ceremonies of the Dunkards. By 1805, Linch partnered with Chapman to preach Universalist sermons in Fairfield, Newberry, and nearby areas, where no Brethren minister was active. However, Universalism's spread was slow. In 1830, 25 years after Linch began, Whittemore noted that Linch's efforts, though faithful, were less extensive than those of his predecessors.

By his death in 1842, Linch had provided 37 years of religious service. Among his lasting contributions was his participation in forming the South Carolina Convention of Universalists, a local governing body that formally united the Martin, Chapman, and Linch societies with the larger Universalist denomination in America.

== South Carolina Universalist societies and convention ==
In 1830, two Universalist societies were officially organized in South Carolina. The first was in Feasterville. John Feaster, son of Andrew Feaster, was among the founding members of this society that would become the Liberty Universalist Church.

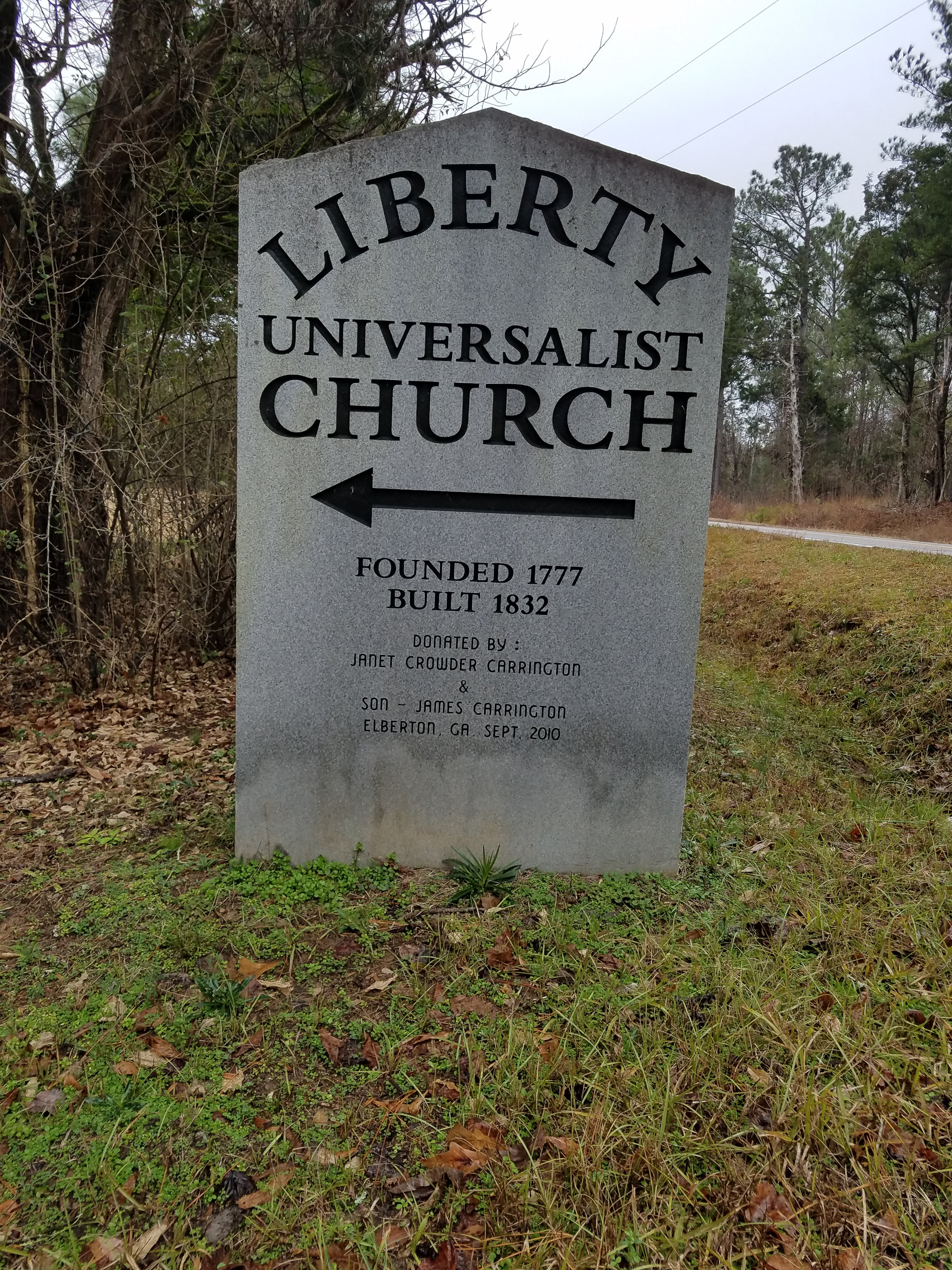
Signage to the Liberty Universalist Church

Numerous articles in newspapers and periodicals as well as the current church signage note that the Liberty Universalist Church was founded in 1777. This founding date could not be independently confirmed. The 1777 date is consistent with the time frame when David Martin was preaching his Brethren theology. It is even possible that this Dunker/pre-Universalist congregation formed earlier than 1777. As cited earlier, Morgan Edwards observed that there was an active congregation in this area as early as 1772. Regardless of a founding date any time in the 1770s, it is unlikely that the term “Universalist” would have been included in the congregation's name.

Since Martin's congregants had no meeting house, they most likely met in local homes or at a local meetinghouse. An area historian speculated that the Mobley Meetinghouse, available to all religious groups, might have been used.

A second Universalist society followed in October 1830 at the Hartford meetinghouse in Newberry district. Rev. Linch proposed that the new society be called the First Universalist Society of Newberry District. A month later, in November 1830, Universalists gathered again at the Hartford meetinghouse and formed the South Carolina Convention of Universalists. The convention provided an organization body for South Carolina Universalists, enabling them to call preachers and manage the collective affairs of the state's Universalists.

Accounts regarding the construction date of the Liberty Universalist Church vary from 1830 to 1832. The current church signage notes that the church was constructed in 1832. A contemporary news account regarding the second meeting of the South Carolina Convention of Universalists in September 1831 in Feasterville commented upon the zeal of the local brothers “in building the Liberty Meeting House.” This account documents that the current structure on the Liberty Universalist lot was erected as early as September 1831.

The Liberty Universalist and Newberry churches were later joined by societies that formed in Lexington, Laurens, Anderson and Abbeville districts. All these societies joined the South Carolina Convention of Universalists. The Convention remained active until the start of the American Civil War (1860–1865). The last meeting of the Convention was held at the Liberty Universalist church in 1860. The Liberty Universalist Church then drifted into a state of near dormancy along with other Universalist societies.

In 1870, Rev. D.B. Clayton reported to the Universalist national convention that the only church building in South Carolina that remained in the possession of the Universalists was the Feasterville church.

== Liberty Universalist Church – re-established ==
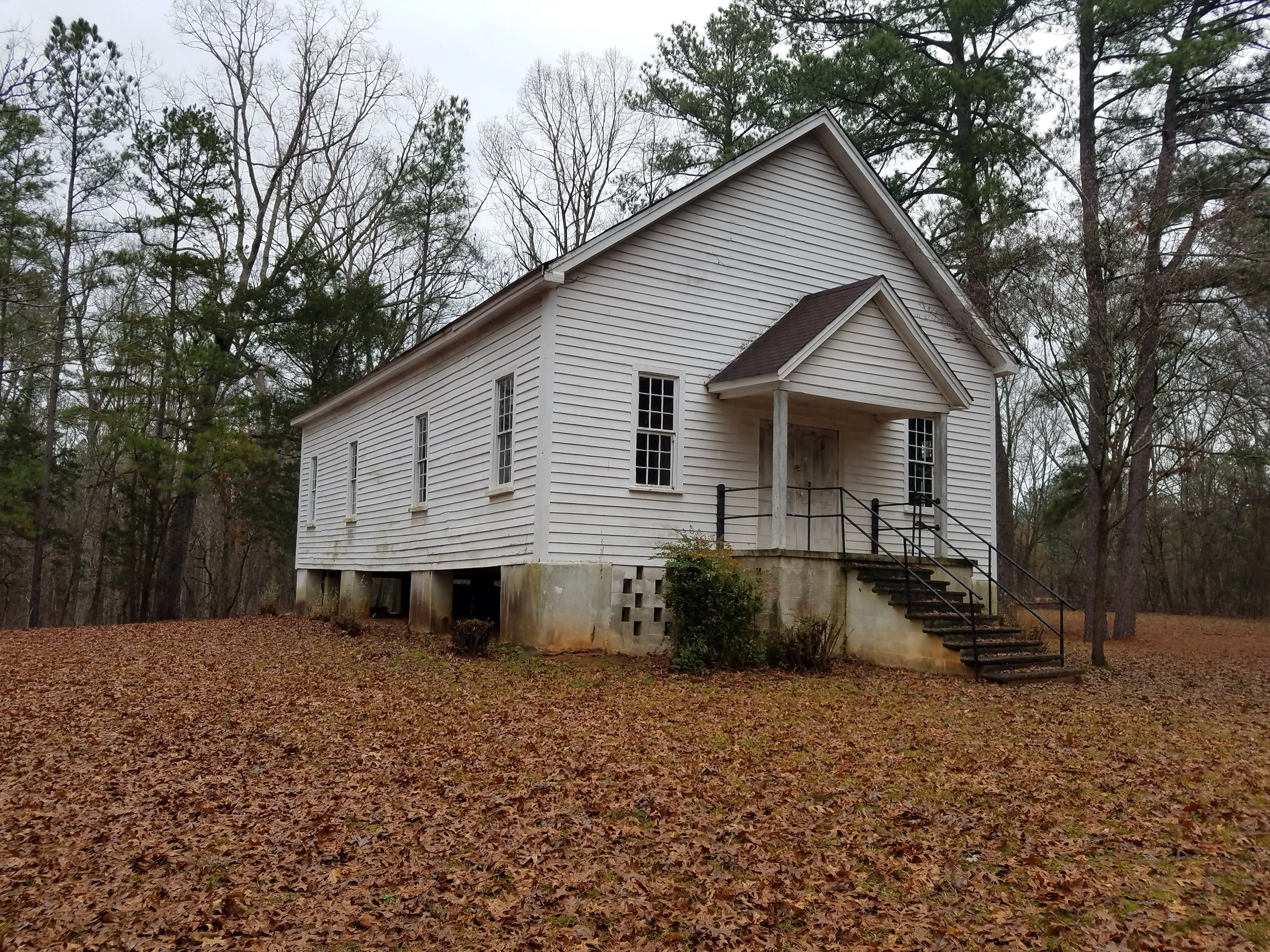
The exterior of the Liberty Universalist Church

An invitation extended to Clayton by the church in 1871 was the start of the revival of the church. Clayton, in his autobiography, recalled that among the congregants who responded to his 1871 call for individuals to commit themselves to a re-organization of the church was Jennie Coleman, the great-great-granddaughter of the family patriarch Andrew Feaster Sr. Six years passed, however, before the church was officially re-organized in 1877. At that time, 25 members committed to the re-organization, including D.R. Coleman, J.A.F. Coleman and V.P. Clayton who served as deacons, J.C. Feaster as treasurer and J. Hendrix McLane as clerk. By 1883, the church had 35 members and an active Sunday school. Preaching was still limited, with Clayton providing services only six to eight times a year. Membership growth in the only Universalist church in the state showed modest gains, rising to 58 by 1887.

The South Carolina Convention that had ceased operations in 1860 was revived in 1895. Little is known of the Liberty Universalist Church religious activities in the early part of the 20thcentury. A 1929 report revealed that only two religious services had been conducted that year at the church by Rev. J.M. Rasnake of Atlanta. Dire financial conditions in the late 1920s did not bode well for South Carolina cotton farmers nor a revival of the church's fortunes.

In the 1940s, Rev. Thomas Chapman, a native South Carolinian, now living in Georgia occasionally travelled to the Feasterville church to provide services. However, by the 1950s it appears that the church had ceased religious services.

== Feasterville Academy ==
The Feasterville Academy, then called the Seminary, opened on January 2, 1845. Mrs. Catharine Ladd, who had previously taught at the Brattonsville Female Seminary in York County, South Carolina and more recently (1842–1844) at the Woodward Academy in Winnsboro, was appointed principal.

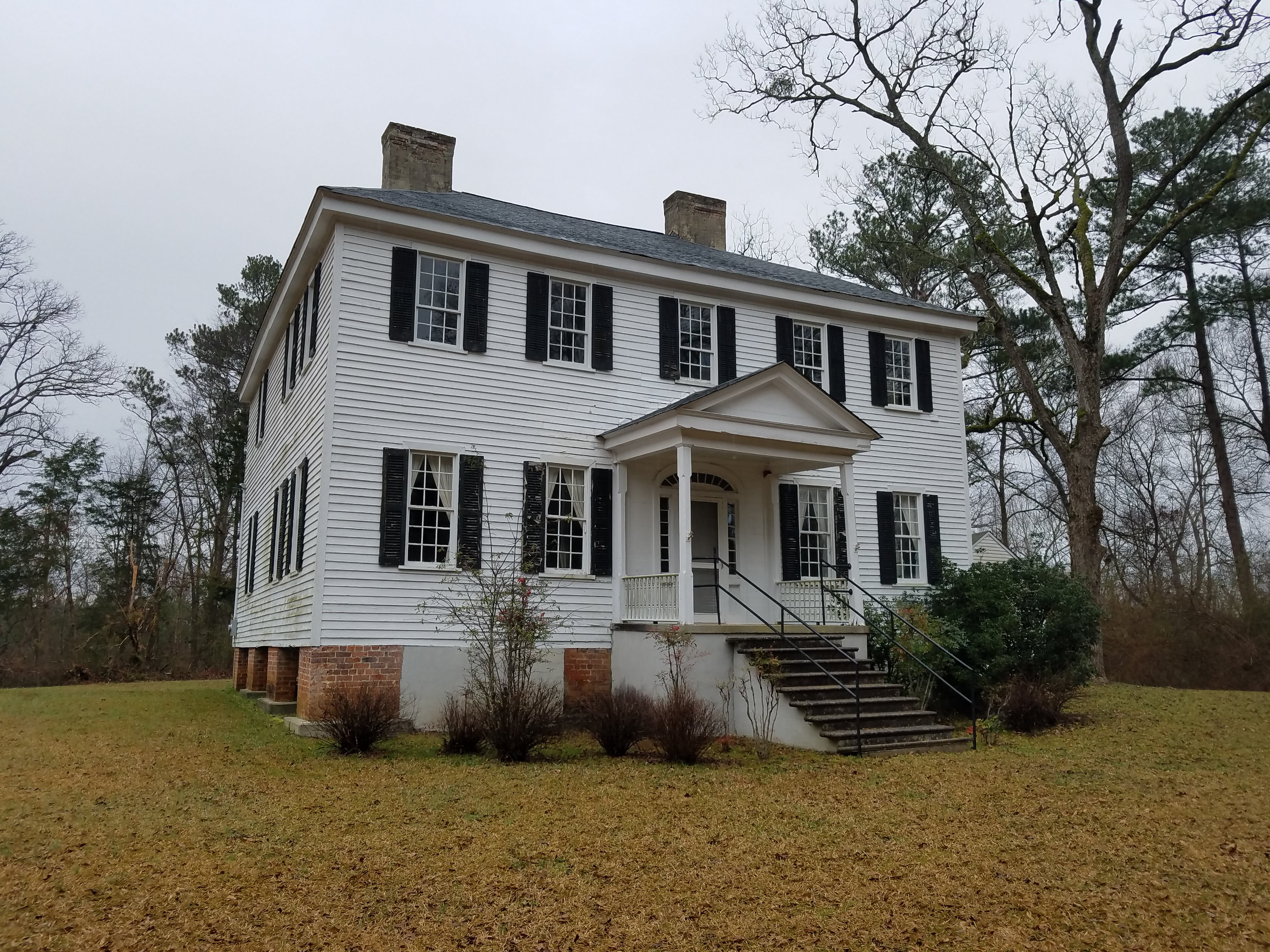
The exterior of the Feasterville Boarding house.

Local historians credit Ladd as the inspiration for the Feasterville Seminary. According to local lore, in 1840 John Feaster, son of Andrew Feaster Sr., commissioned a South Carolina portrait painter named George Williamson Ladd, the husband of Catharine. While sitting for his portrait, Catharine Ladd asked, “Mr. Feaster, there are so many young ladies in the neighborhood, why don’t you build a school for them?” Feaster responded, “If I build one, will you teach in it?” Ladd responded in the affirmative.

The school consisted of a boarding house, a kitchen, and a school building. The scholastic year was divided into two sessions of five months each. At that time, boarding cost was $8.00 per month. Charges for academic courses ranged from $6.00 to $25.00 per five-month session. Academic courses included spelling, reading, writing, arithmetic, geography, history, Latin, French and music.

Over the years others followed Catharine Ladd as principal, including Rev. D.B. Clayton, Miss Margaret Narcissa Feaster, Mr. Feaster Lyles and his sister, Isabelle Lyles.

The school was later renamed the Feasterville Male and Female Academy.

After the academy closed, the schoolhouse was used as a rural one-teacher school. However, by 1929 with the countywide school consolidation, the building ceased being used for academic purposes.

== Denouement ==
In his 1847 will John Feaster bequeathed the academy's five and one-half acres and its buildings to his sons Jacob Feaster, Andrew Feaster and John Mobley Feaster “in trust and for the benefit of Feasterville Male and Female Academy. I appoint them trustees of the same.” Trustees have continuously been appointed, resulting in the maintenance of the buildings and property. The buildings are now used as the venue for yearly family reunions.
