= Church of Our Father (Atlanta) =

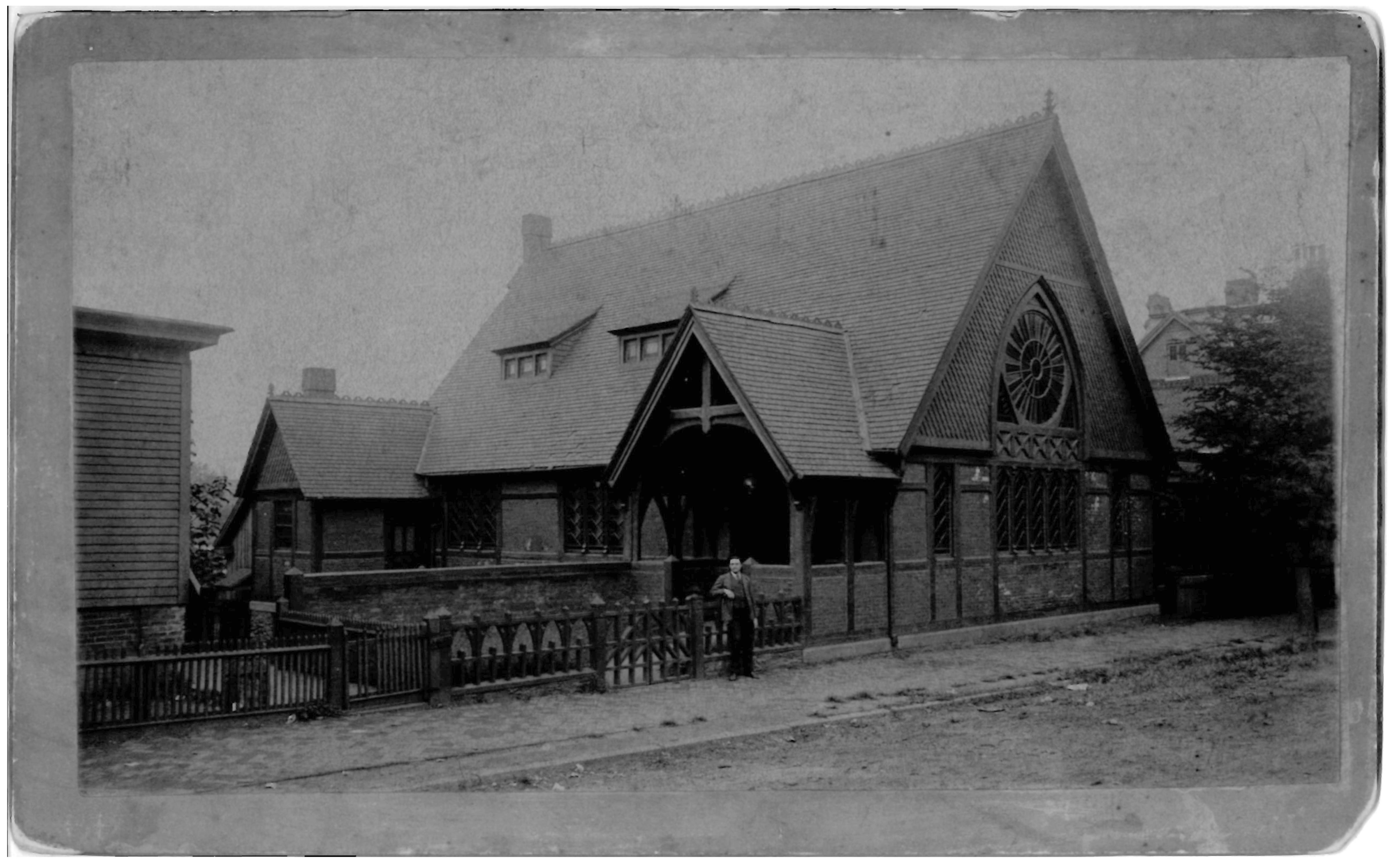
- Church of Our Father
- Location: Corner of Church and Forsyth, Atlanta, Georgia
- Country: United States
- Denomination: Unitarian

History
- Founded: March 27, 1883
- Founder: Rev. George Leonard Chaney
- Dedicated: April 23, 1884

Architecture
- Architect: G.L. Norrman
- Style: Gothic
- Completed: December 1883
- Demolished: 1900

Specifications
- Materials: Exterior: half-timber and half brick construction with high arched roofs covered with red tile. Interior: Georgia pine, oil finish

Unitarian Church of Atlanta
- Unitarian Church of Atlanta
- Location: Corner of Cain and Spring, Atlanta, Georgia
- Country: United States
- Denomination: Unitarian

History
- Former name: Church of Our Father
- Founded: March 27, 1883
- Founder: Rev. George Leonard Chaney
- Dedicated: November 11, 1900

Architecture
- Style: Classis
- Demolished: 1914

Specifications
- Materials: Interior: Walls painted tint of green with a border of laurel wreaths. Pulpit and furniture are polished oak. Auditorium contains opera chairs.

Church of Our Father was the first Unitarian church established in Atlanta, Georgia. The church was organized on March 27, 1883, by Rev. George Leonard Chaney, a Boston minister. Rev. Chaney initially held Sunday services in the Senate Chamber, Concordia Hall and the United States Courtroom. A church building was constructed at the corner of North Forsyth and Church Street and dedicated on April 23, 1884. The original building was demolished in 1900.

The church continued to serve Atlanta's liberal religious community for more than six decades. During that time the church name was changed several times. In 1918, Atlanta's Unitarians merged with the city's Universalist congregation. The combined congregation collapsed in 1951.

== Unitarian churches in the South ==
From its founding in 1825, the southern church expansion of the Boston-based American Unitarian Association (AUA) was hampered by the liberal Unitarian theology perceived in the south as religious heresy and the AUA'S adoption in 1837 of abolition advocacy. Prior to the Civil War, Unitarian churches were operating in Richmond, Virginia; Augusta and Savannah, Georgia; Mobile, Alabama; Louisville, Kentucky; Charleston, South Carolina and New Orleans, Louisiana. By the end of the Civil War, only the churches in Louisville, Charleston and New Orleans were active.

For years after the war, the AUA made no effort to regain or expand its southern churches. This non-engagement policy was reversed at the January 10, 1881 meeting of the directors of the AUA. The directors authorized Rev. John Heywood to conduct a tour of general missionary work in the south and requested that Rev. Enoch Powell perform missionary work specifically in Atlanta. Six months after Rev. Powell's initial Atlanta trip, the AUA directors allocated $1,000 for Atlanta missionary work and requested that Rev. Chaney lead that effort.

Years later Rev. Chaney noted, "They had sent a young minister to spy out the land, who promptly returned with the tidings of 'nothing doing' or to be done in Atlanta. I was then a member of the Executive Board of the Association and very zealous in sending other ministers into the field. So, for very shame, when I was asked to go myself, I could not refuse."

=== Timing of Atlanta missionary work ===
The resumption of missionary work in Atlanta coincided with the city's recovery from the Civil War. By the 1880s Atlanta was experiencing a building boom and the 1881 International Cotton Exposition brought favorable national attention to the city. More specifically to the Unitarian southern expansion effort, the idea of the exposition originated with a Bostonian Unitarian, Edward Atkinson. Atkinson subsequently served on the exposition's executive committee with Georgia Governor Colquitt and prominent citizens of the city. If not directly influencing the timing of the AUA's action, the relationships established by Atkinson were leveraged by the AUA directors in their Atlanta expansion strategy.

Upon the arrival of Rev. Powell in Atlanta in January 1881, the city newspaper reported that Unitarian services would be held in that state's senate chambers "by the courtesy of Governor Colquitt." In February 1882 when Rev. Chaney arrived in Atlanta, The Atlanta Constitution newspaper included in his biographical background that Rev. Chaney "has labored for the cause of industrial education with Mr. Edward Atkinson, of Boston."

=== Church of Our Father founded ===
In March 1883, approximately one year after Rev. Chaney first arrived in Atlanta, he announced "that the time had come for giving organized form to the interest we felt on the establishment of a new church in Atlanta." A church covenant and constitution were adopted and a committee appointed to identify property on which a new church building could be built. A month later, in April 1883, the committee reported that a lot had been secured with funds provided by the AUA. A church building was soon erected on the corner of Forsyth and Church Streets and dedicated on the evening of April 23, 1884.

The church remained at this location until 1899 when the church property was sold to the Carnegie Library Trustees for the construction of Atlanta's first public library. A new church building was constructed nearby at the corner of Spring and Forsyth Streets and dedicated in January 1900.

=== Name change ===
A proposal to rename the church to the "First Unitarian Church of Atlanta" was offered during the January 1901 church annual meeting but was voted down. The timing of the initiative to change the church's name may have been influenced by the dedication a year earlier of the new First Universalist Church of Atlanta building on East Harris Street. The two denominations shared liberal faith principles and had a sense of common bond in the otherwise orthodox faith environment in Atlanta.

Three years later another effort was made to rename the church. On April 17, 1904, members were asked to vote on two names; "Church of Our Father, Unitarian" or "First Unitarian Church of Atlanta." Both names failed to achieve the required two-thirds majority. However, after a request by one member to change his ballot, the vote to change the name to the First Unitarian Church of Atlanta carried by that single vote.

=== New building, merger and name change ===
The Unitarians sold their second church building and built their third church on West Peachtree Street in 1915. This new church building located between Third Avenue and Kimball Street (now Ponce de Leon) included a set of stained glass windows known as the Founders' Windows. The name was derived from an inscription on the windows reading "In Honor of George Leonard Chaney - Caroline Isabel Chaney". Rev. Chaney and his wife Isabel were both present as the hymn of dedication was sung by the then pastor, Rev. Joseph Wade Conkling.

Three years later Atlanta's Universalists joined their fellow liberal colleagues in this church building in what was described as a temporary merger for the duration of World War I. This merger of local Atlanta Unitarians and Universalists appears to have been influenced by a December 1917 recommendation by the AUA. As a war economy effort, the AUA recommended that churches consider federation or combination for the "winter or the duration of the war."

The merger was announced in a February 23, 1918, article in The Atlanta Constitution. "The Unitarian and Universalists of Atlanta will meet in public worship at the Unitarian Church, 301 West Peachtree street, tomorrow morning at 11 o'clock. This is the first meeting under a temporary merger of the two congregations which is planned to last for the duration of the war. Rev. T.B. Fisher, the retiring minister of the Universalist church, will preach on 'The Larger Destiny.' All friends are cordially invited."

The merger of the two denominations, however, continued long after the conclusion of the war in November 1918.

In a 1940 report commissioned by the Universalist Church of America (UCA), Rev. Frederic Perkins observed that the two small liberal communities merged and continued together primarily to offset separate weaknesses. Both churches had exhibited limited growth despite the expansion of Atlanta's population and both had remained dependent on the financial assistance from their respective national organizations.

Outwardly the merger appeared successful. Once combined, the Unitarians and Universalists renamed their joint church the Liberal Christian Church. The Universalist church building on East Harris Street was sold in April 1920 for $20,000 (~$236,532 in 2024) and the proceeds were set aside to assist the newly federated congregation. The Women's Mission Circle from the Universalist church and the Woman's Alliance organization from the Unitarian church were merged into a single Woman's Union organization. The Universalist's Young People's Christian Union (Y.P.C.U.) became the basis for youth religion education for the new church. Ministers were selected from both the Unitarian and Universalist denominations. Eight years later in 1926, the members changed the church name again to the United Liberal Church. However, publicly the church was commonly known as the Unitarian-Universalist Church.

== Seeds of discord ==
The Unitarians may have newly arrived in Atlanta, but the Universalists had long established churches in the rural Georgia countryside and carried their southern traditions into the city. The pastor of the church shortly after the merger, Rev. Earnest J. Bowden, raised an alarm that social differences threatened the federated church. "It grits our people badly to see a man chewing a quid of tobacco all through service or to see another rise from his seat and spit out the window. Then there are contra charges of snobbishness."

Fifteen years later Rev. Frederic Perkins echoed Bowden's comments in his 1940 report. "If the urban Unitarian sometimes failed to appreciate the rural Universalist, the latter was sometimes unduly sensitive and imagined slights that were not intended. But the sense of separateness was there, close to the surface ready to aggravate the frictions that weakness is apt to engender in a small church."

The changing social environment in post World War II America further exacerbated fissures in church social unity. During the short ministry (1947-1948) of the Massachusetts-born Universalist Rev. Isaiah Jonathan Domas, external and internal pressures gave birth to the beginning of the end of the liberal church presence in Atlanta.

=== Communism ===
Churchill's 1946 declaration that an Iron Curtain had descended across Europe ushered in an era of a global Communist red scare. The Atlanta church was swept up in this global phenomena with a fear that their new minister was a communist sympathizer. Rev. Domas's support of Henry A. Wallace and his 1948 presidential third-party candidacy was evidence enough to some church members that his liberal politics were out of step with southern traditions. Domas's association with the poet and union organizer Don West further solidified his public image as a leftist.

An August 1948 editorial by Ralph McGill of The Atlanta Constitution was blunt in its assessment. "Don West, who has served here and there in the South as a preacher, teacher and Communist organizer as well as a contributor in the Communist Daily Worker, turns up on a farm outside Douglasville, Ga., which he has rented or leased to a Unitarian Church Youth project." McGill continued, "This fact will cause most of the local Unitarian Church members to fret even more than they are. They are convinced that the Communist Party has caused the Unitarian Church, because of its liberal policy, to be selected for infiltration purposes and for use in various Communist front purposes."

This public association with Communism of the Atlanta Unitarian church and its minister did not go unnoticed by the Federal Bureau of Investigation (FBI). In Don West's FBI file the following was noted, "On one occasion, while West was in the congregation of this church, Domas read one of West's poems, asked West to stand, and introduced him as an example for the members of the congregation to follow."

=== Segregation ===
As the church wrestled with public insinuations of Communist complicity, a real assault on long-standing and fundamental southern segregation policies was underway. In 1944 the Supreme Court ruling in Smith v. Allwright declared unconstitutional the white-only primary system long used by southern Democrats to restrict minority voting rights. Four years later, President Harry S. Truman would sign Executive Order 9981, ending segregation in the United States Armed Forces. Change to southern Jim Crow traditions was afoot.

Rev. Domas, in both words and action, reflected this change.

Upon arrival in Atlanta, he took a one-day a week job at Atlanta University, a predominately black college. Rev. Domas also reserved the right to meet with whomever he chose in his home. That company included Dr. Thomas Baker Jones, a black Unitarian from Ohio. Rev. Domas considered it a "heart-sickening duty" to discourage Dr. Jones from attending Sunday service. Nonetheless, Dr. Jones attended a Sunday service in November 1947.

Rev. Domas recounted the event. "He was seated without incident, even to the taking of his offering ... but the matter was hardly allowed to rest there. An ultra-race conscious minority promptly rushed to the telephone and served notice on those two members of the board with whom they felt they had the most in common that I should be fired forthwith."

Rev. Domas's daughter described what happened next as seen from the parsonage located next to the West Peachtree Street church.

"When the Ku Klux Klan threatened our family in the fall of 1947, I was too young to be told and too short to look out the high windows. If I saw anything alarming it was the odd way my parents stared at the street. My mother stood on one side of a closed drape, my father on the other. Each lifted just enough cloth to let in a sharp slice of Georgia sunlight. On West Peachtree Street, two floors below, a convoy of battered cars and rusty pickup trucks stretched from Third Street to Ponce de Leon. Each was full of Klansmen in white robes tilting back their pointed hoods to hunt for motion behind our drapes."

Several weeks later the church voted to exclude Negroes from all church functions. The local newspaper reported the news with an article entitled "Wallacite's Church Votes Negro Ban".

Rev. Domas offered his resignation to the board of trustees and the church subsequently voted to accept his resignation by a vote of 33 to 32.

=== Response ===
At its May 1948 meeting, the Unitarian Ministers' Association responded to the actions taken by the church by refusing to send any future candidates to Atlanta until the church reversed its segregationist policy. At the October 1950 meeting of the AUA Board of Directors, a recommendation was made and later accepted that both the Universalist Church of America and the American Unitarian Association withdraw support from the Atlanta congregation. In September 1951, the AUA sold the church building on West Peachtree Street and the church was officially disbanded.

== Renewed efforts in Atlanta ==
Following the sale of the church building and the disbanding of the original congregation, the Universalist Church of America and the American Unitarian Association coordinated efforts to raise a new liberal church in Atlanta. Rev. Glenn O. Canfield was dispatched to the city in early 1952. He successfully regrouped several former members and attracted new members and re-chartered the United Liberal Church. In 1966, the church changed its name to the Unitarian Universalist Congregation of Atlanta (UUCA).

== Ministers ==
=== Unitarian Church ===
Minister	From	To	Comments
Rev. Enoch Powell	Jan 1881	Jan 1881	Rev. Powell was sent to Atlanta by the Directors of the American Unitarian Association to investigate establishing a Unitarian church.
Rev. George Leonard Chaney	Jan 1882	Nov 1890	Rev. Chaney followed up on Rev. Powell exploratory mission. Resigned to accept the position of the Southern Superintendent of the AUA; later minister in Richmond, Virginia.
Rev. William Roswell Cole	Jul 1891	Oct 1895	Resigned to accept a call to the Unitarian church Cohasset, Massachusetts.
Rev. Walter Scott Vail	Apr 1896	Nov 1899	Resigned to accept a call to the Unity church in Sioux City, Iowa.
Rev. Clarence A. Langston	Jan 1900	Jul 1905	Resigned and left the Unitarian church to join the Episcopal church.
Rev. Moore Sanborn	Oct 1905	Aug 1906	Resigned to resume his career in the insurance industry.
Rev. Rush R. Shippen	Oct 1906	Jun 1907	Rev. Shippen informed the board of trustees in Apr 1907 that due to his wife's age and feeble health that he would not return to the pulpit in the fall.
Rev. Alexander Thomas Bowser	Oct 1907	May 1908	Resigned to accept a call to the Unitarian church in Richmond, Virginia.
Rev. John Wesley Rowlett	Oct 1908	Sep 1911	Resigned to accepted a position as the Southern Secretary of the American Unitarian Association.
Rev. Joseph Wade Conkling	Dec 1911	Spring 1917	Resigned to accept a commission in the US Army. Killed in action in France during World War I.
Rev. Ralph E. Conner	Nov 1917	Jan 1918	Temporary pulpit service.

=== Merged Unitarian and Universalist church ===
Minister	From	To	Comments
Walter Scott Swisher	Jan 1918	Apr 1918	Temporary pulpit service also provided by: Rev. Ralph E. Connor; Rev. T.B. Fisher who conducted the first service (Feb 23, 1918) of the newly merged church; Rev. Nobbs, field Secretary of the AUA; Rev. D.B. Price of the Methodist Conference, Montana; Rev. J.C. Hawk, China, of Methodist Conference; Rev. John W. Rowlett.
Rev. Thomas Burr Fisher	Jan 1918	Apr 1918	Retired.
Rev. Henry Butterfield Taylor	Jun 1918	Aug 1918	Temporary pulpit service also provided by: Rev. T.B. Fisher, Rev. Rasnake, Rev. F.B. Bishop.
Rev. Frank Oliver Hall	Sep 1918	Sep 1918	Significant advertising appeared in the Atlanta papers that Rev. Hall from New York City would be the minister. Rev. Hall conducted four services (Sep 7 - 29, 1923). No further mention of Rev. Hall is found in church records or the Atlanta newspapers.
Rev. Gideon Isaac Keirn	Oct 1918	Oct 1922	Died.
Several Ministers	Oct 1922	Apr 1923	Temporary pulpit service provided by: Rabbi Marx; Rev. B.H. Clark; Dr. Frank R. Shipman, Atlanta Theological Seminary; Rev. Lyman Ward of Camp Hill, Alabama; Rev. J.M. Rasnake, Rev. F.B. Bishop, Southern Superintendent of Universalist Church; Dr. Thornwell Jacobs, President of Oglethorpe University, Rev. John W. Rowlett.
Rev. Ernest John Bowden	Sep 1923	Nov 1925	Controversy resulted in resignation. Moved to Berkeley, California to study.
Lay Lead Services	Dec 1925	Oct 1926	
Rev. Clinton Lee Scott	Nov 1926	Aug 1929	Resigned to accept a call to the First Universalist Church in Peoria, Illinois.
Several Ministers	Sep 1929	Sep 1930	Temporary pulpit supply.
Rev. Aubrey Hess	Sep 1930	Oct 1935	Died.
Rev. Frederic Mitchell Tileston	Feb 1937	1940	Resigned to accept a call to the Unitarian church in Deerfield, Massachusetts.
Rev. Roger Dewey Bosworth	Aug 1940	1945	Resigned to accept the position as National Youth Director of Youth Activities of the Universalist Church.
Rev. Raymond Harold Palmer	Mar 1946	Aug 1947	Resigned to teach philosophy at Roosevelt College, Chicago, Illinois.
Rev. Isaiah Jonathan Domas	Sep 1947	Sep 1948	Controversy over politics and racial segregation resulted in resignation.
Rev. Earle LeBaron	Sep 1948	Dec 1950	LeBaron left the Roman Catholic priesthood in 1932 and served other churches. Unitarian and Universalist national organizations withdrew support for the Atlanta Church. The AUA sold the church property in 1950.
Rev. Joseph Rabun	Dec 1950	Jan 1954	Rabun was pastor of the McRae Baptist church until his resignation over a dispute with Herman Talmadge, a fellow church congregant, over Talmadge support for Georgia white only primary legislation. Rabun ran and lost a bid for governor of Georgia in 1948. After the sale of the church property, Rabun held Sunday services at the Cox-Carlton Hotel and
