= George Leonard Chaney =

American minister (1836–1922)

Rev. George Leonard Chaney
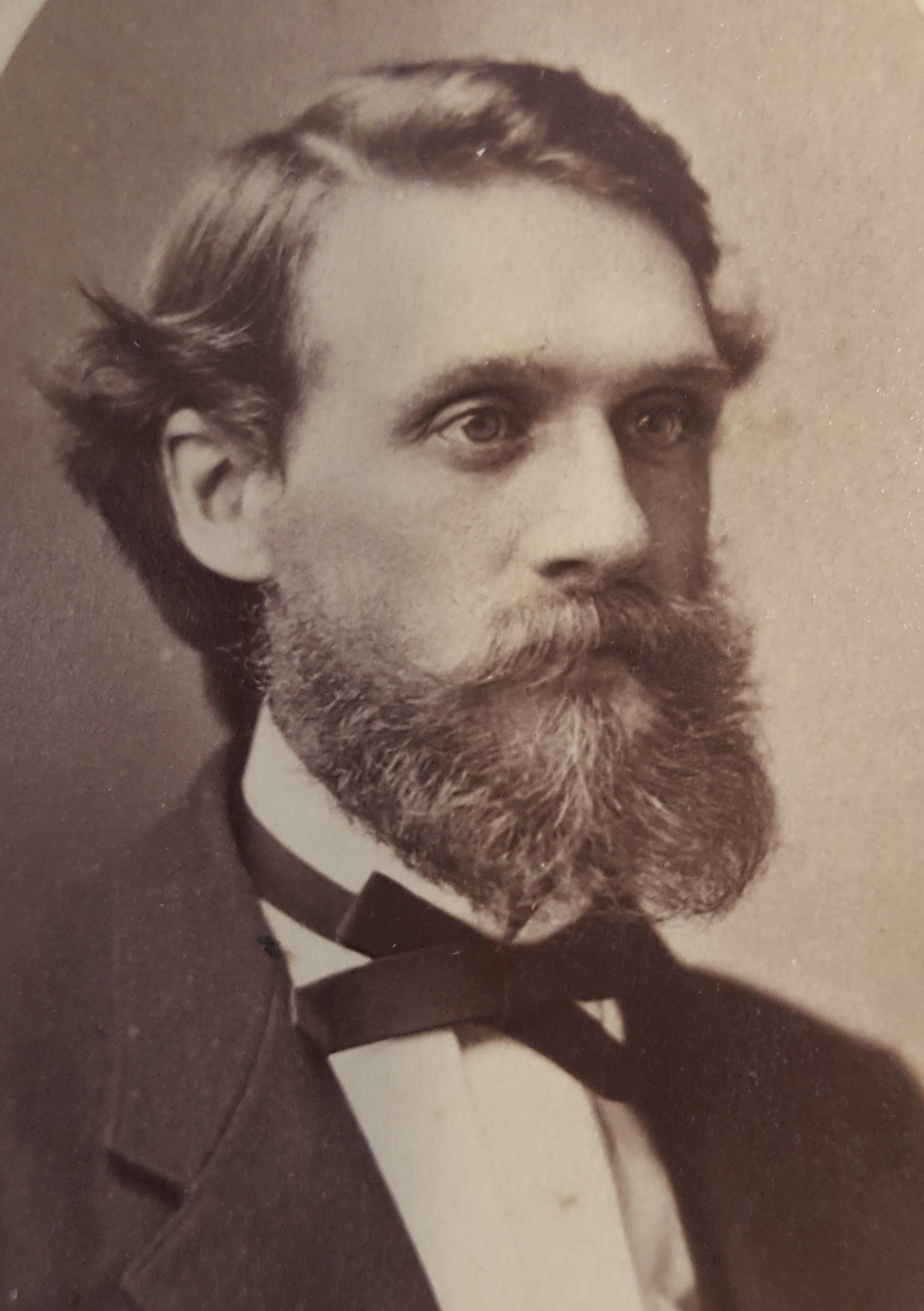
- Born: December 24, 1836; Salem, Massachusetts
- Died: April 19, 1922 (aged 85); Salem, Massachusetts
- Burial place: Salem, Massachusetts
- Education: Meadville Theological School, Pennsylvania
- Occupation: Unitarian minister
- Years active: 33
- Spouse: Caroline Isabel Chaney (née Carter)
- Children: George Carter Chaney
- Parent(s): James Chaney and Harriet Webb Chaney

Ecclesiastical career
- Religion: Unitarian
- Ordained: 1862
- Offices held: Minister, Southern Superintendent

George Leonard Chaney (December 24, 1836 – April 19, 1922) was an American Unitarian minister who served the city's Hollis Street Church for 15 years. In 1882, at the American Unitarian Association's (A.U.A.) request, he moved to Atlanta to organize the first Unitarian church in that city. As the A.U.A. Southern Superintendent, he was a leader in expanding Unitarianism across the South. He later moved to Richmond, Virginia and established another Unitarian church. In 1895, he retired from his superintendent and ministerial duties and returned to Massachusetts.

== Early life ==
George Leonard Chaney, born in the Massachusetts coastal city of Salem on December 24, 1836, was the fourth and last child of James Chaney (1797-1884) and Harriet Webb Chaney (1803-1900). His siblings included Harriet Webb (1828-1896), Mary Webb (1830-1917), and James Henry (1832-1862).

Chaney's father was a distant descendant of Scottish immigrants who settled in the Massachusetts Bay Colony in the 1600s. The senior Chaney owned a general store that sold a variety of beverages and foods, including rum, brandy, spices, meat, coffee, butter, and general household goods.

In 1823, the senior Chaney briefly partnered with Stephen Haradan in a mercantile enterprise that sold goods to the general public and sailing vessels. After the partnership ended in 1824, he continued in the dry goods business, achieving a degree of success that led him to sell his business to William B. Ashton, an associate, in 1853. Chaney continued in the mercantile business at a reduced scale, now as a wholesaler.

== Education ==
George Leonard Chaney was educated at Salem High School and the Latin Grammar School. Afterward, he continued his education at Harvard College, graduating in 1859 with a Bachelor of Arts. In his senior year, Chaney competed for a Boylston Elocution prize for delivering a five-minute memorized talk in English, Greek, or Latin, placing second in his category. He belonged to several college societies, including the Phi Beta Kappa academic honor society.

Following his graduation, he left Boston and moved to Meadville, Pennsylvania, where he was employed as a tutor. He later entered the nearby Meadville Lombard Theological School, a Unitarian seminary, and graduated with a divinity degree in 1862.

== Marriage and children ==
Caroline Chaney

In January 1871, Chaney, 35, married Caroline Isabel Carter, 26 (1845–1925) from Leominster, Massachusetts. She was a distant descendant of Rev. Thomas and Mary Carter, early Puritan settlers who arrived in New England in the early 1600s. Over the generations, the Carter family settled throughout New England and New York. One relative, Captain Joseph Oliver Carter (1802-1850), settled in Honolulu. He was a seafaring captain of merchant ships that traded with China, Hawaii, Mexico, Alaska, and California.

The Chaneys had one son, George Carter Chaney, born in November 1871. He was an attorney who married Evadne Hubbard Jewett in Cambridge, Massachusetts, in 1901. They lived in Salem and had two children, Constance Jewett and Oliver Carter.

== Northern ministry ==
Chaney's Northern ministry spanned the years 1862 to 1882.

=== Hollis Street Church ===
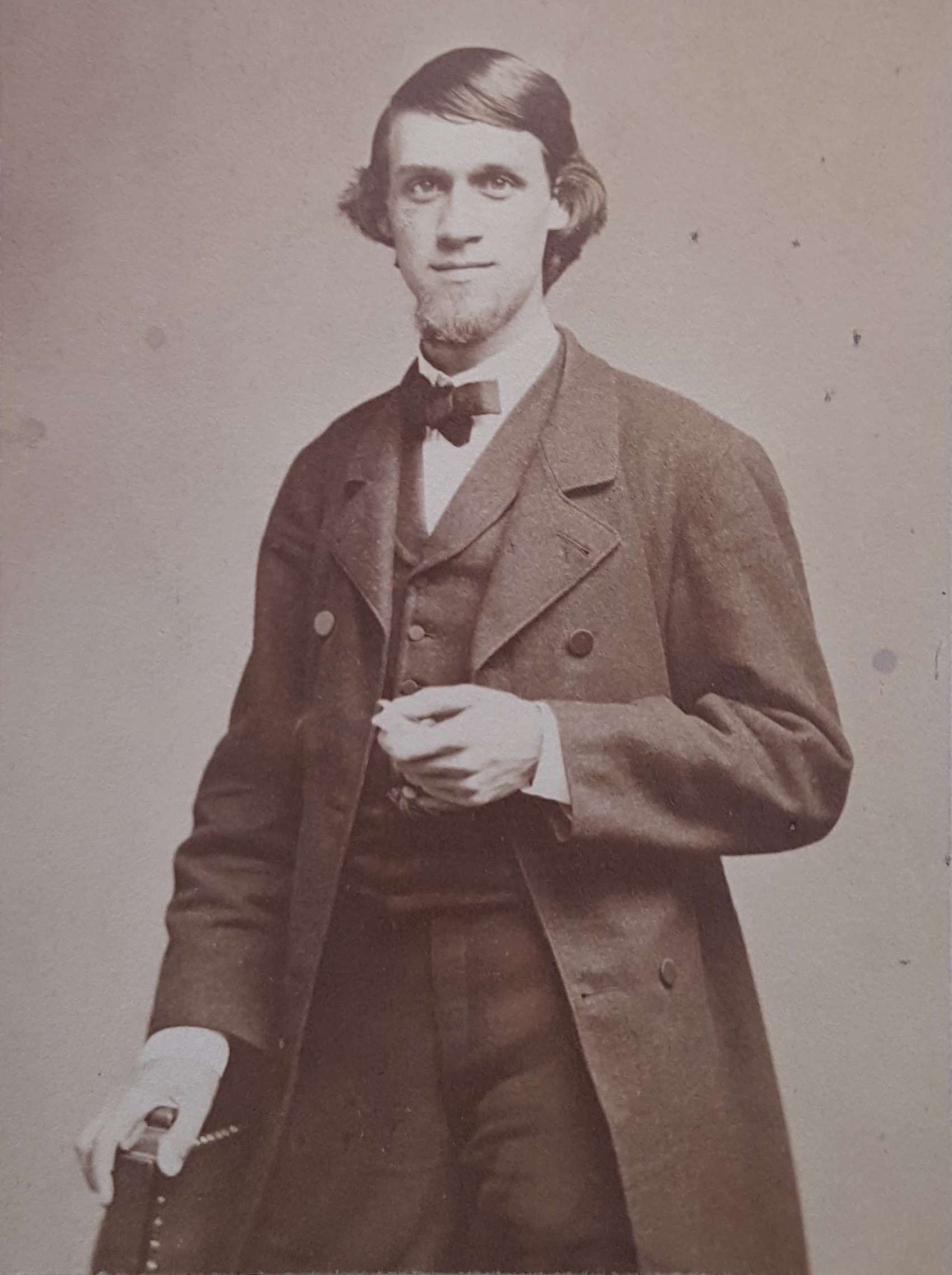
George Leonard Chaney, pastor of Hollis Street Church, Boston

Not long after he graduated from Meadville Theological Seminary, Boston's Hollis Street Church called the 26-year-old Chaney to their pulpit in 1862. This call to the Hollis Street pulpit was Chaney's first pastorate. Reflecting on this period, an 82-year-old Chaney noted, "A minister's first parish is his real school of preparation for the ministry.” The imprint of this first pastorate is seen in his future endeavors. Chaney served the Hollis Street Church for 15 years, from 1862 to 1877.

=== Historic church ===
Founded in 1732 as a Congregationalist church, in 1800, the Hollis Street Church realigned with the newly emerging Unitarian movement. Chaney followed notable Unitarian ministers such as Horace Holley (1809–1818), Rev. John Pierpont (1819–1845), and Rev. Starr King (1848–1860). King, a forceful and tireless orator, left Boston to become the pastor of the First Unitarian Church in San Francisco, California. King died unexpectedly at age 40 in 1864.

Chaney was the recipient of the church's gravitas and the prestige of its former ministers. Boston's most distinguished Unitarian ministers performed his ordination ceremony in October 1862. Attending ministers included Rev. H.W. Foote of King's Chapel, who offered Chaney the Right Hand of Fellowship, Rev. F. H. Hedge from Brookline, who delivered a sermon, Rev. William Newell of Cambridge, who gave the ordination prayer, and Rev. Edward E. Hale of South Congregational Church who charged the incoming pastor.

Chaney's circle of influential Unitarian ministers grew during his Hollis Street ministry. In August 1864, two years after his ordination, Chaney offered the Right Hand of Fellowship during the ordination of another new minister, Rev. Francis E. Abbott. Again, Rev. Edward E. Hale and Rev. Henry W. Foote were present. Other Unitarian ministers, including Rev. James Freeman Clarke and Rev. William P. Tilden, also participated.

Later that same year, in December, Chaney again joined Tilden and Hale at the ordination of Rev. Horatio Alger, Jr., when he became the pastor of the Unitarian Church in Brewster, Massachusetts.

=== Challenges to a new ministry ===
Chaney faced three challenges at the start of his Hollis Street ministry. First, he was filling a pulpit that his predecessor, Rev. Starr King, had vacated two and a half years earlier. His society needed “shepherding” to a new ministry—a shepherding made difficult by his second challenge. Some at the church hoped that the beloved Starr King would soon return and attempted to preserve his church customs and practices. The third challenge was the American Civil War (1861–1865), which drew the church into an unfolding national tragedy. Chaney noted that the war changed the church's primary concern from its members to “the soldiers and the freedman.”

=== Civil War years ===
In October 1863, Chaney hosted Rev. Rufus Stebbins, the president of the American Unitarian Association (1862–1865), at his Hollis Street Church. Rev Stebbins described the Association's missionary work to the U.S. Federal army, which consisted of distributing thousands of religious tracts and visits by Unitarian ministers.

Two months later, in December 1863, under the auspices of the United States Sanitary Commission, Chaney served as a minister in an army hospital following the Battle of Fredericksburg. The Sanitary Commission, created at the start of the war to care for sick and wounded Federal soldiers, was led by a fellow Harvard graduate and Unitarian minister, Rev. Henry W. Bellows.

Chaney joined other Boston Unitarian ministers in the 1864 U.S. presidential election, delivering supportive sermons for the Union and Abraham Lincoln. The Boston Evening Transcript reported that the sermons “may rightly be classed in the front rank of ministerial efforts. As in the day of the Revolution, the pulpit thunders against traitors and oppressors.” A few months later, in April 1865, Chaney delivered an impassioned eulogy for the assassinated U.S. President Lincoln from the same pulpit from which he had endorsed him.

=== Chapel dedicated ===
In December 1864, Chaney was joined by Rev. Edward Hale, Rev. William Tilden, Rev. G.H. Hepworth, and other Boston Unitarian ministers in the dedication of the newly erected Hollis Street Chapel. The two-story brick chapel provided seating for 300 people on the lower floor, a minister's office, a committee room, and a large hall for church programs on the upper floor. One such program was the church's sewing circle. This room would later be utilized for Chaney's woodworking manual education program.

=== National Conference of Unitarian and Other Christian Churches ===
Also in 1864, Unitarian leaders sought to bring about a foundational change to the organizational structure of the American Unitarian Association. Chaney's participation in this reorganization further positioned him as an influential denominational leader.

The American Unitarian Association, formed in 1825, was an association of individuals and thus exerted limited influence over Unitarian churches. As a result, churches had little interest in the A.U.A.’s operations or missionary work. However, the American Civil War caused leading Unitarians in Chaney's circle of ministerial colleagues, such as Rev. Henry W. Bellows and Rev. Edward Everett Hale, to reconsider the potential missionary impact of the Association. They concluded that the Association needed to broaden its organizational structure beyond just ministers.

The initial steps of that restructuring took place on December 7, 1864, at Chaney's Hollis Street Church. At that meeting, the A.U.A. Executive Committee proposed creating an organizational structure involving Unitarian churches in the denomination's decision-making body. Known as the National Conference of Unitarian and Other Christian Churches—churches would be the legislative body operating under the control of the A.U.A.’s Executive Committee.

Five months later, in April 1865, a convention was convened in New York City. Churches were represented by their pastor and two lay delegates. Chaney attended as the Hollis Street cleric representative.

Although designated as a “national conference,” only 11 clusters or conferences were initially organized in just five states: Delaware, Massachusetts, New York, Pennsylvania, and Wisconsin. The Boston-based Suffolk Conference held its organizational meetings at the Hollis Street Church. Hale was the president and Chaney was the conference secretary for several years.

=== "What is a Unitarian?" controversy ===
The formation of the National Conference sparked an unexpected and heated debate over the question, “What did it mean to be Unitarian?”

The debate achieved no broad consensus, resulting two years later, in 1867, with the organization of the Free Religious Association (FRA). The FRA sought to go beyond the boundaries of Christianity to which mainstream Unitarians were closely tied. The Free Religious Association existed until 1917. Chaney aligned with the mainstream ministers and remained committed to the Christian core of Unitarianism.

=== Hollis Street retains Chaney as its minister ===
The Hollis Street Church proprietors, known today as the Board of Trustees, recognized the growing influence of the young minister they had called to the pulpit three years earlier. In October 1865, they increased Chaney's ministerial salary by $500.

Chaney's rising profile within Unitarianism did not go unnoticed. In May 1866, the First Parish Unitarian Church in Providence, Rhode Island, extended an offer to Chaney to fill the pulpit recently vacated by the late Rev. E.B. Hall. First Parish Unitarian Church offered Chaney a yearly salary of $6,000, which was $2,000 more than his current remuneration. Chaney nonetheless declined the offer. His decision gratified the Hollis Street Church parishioners and his “many friends” in Boston. The Boston Evening Transcript reported “that he cannot be spared from the position of great usefulness which he now so acceptably fills.”

Chaney's decision to decline the First Parish call may have been related to his planned trip to Europe the following month. However, it may also be reasonably speculated that Chaney's decision was influenced by his long-term career aspirations within the Unitarian denomination. A move from Boston to Providence, only 50 miles south, would remove him from the center of Unitarian denominational decision-making.

In just a few years, he had gone from a newly ordained minister to a valued member of Boston's Unitarian leadership. He was only 30 years old and had much of his career ahead of him.

=== Trip to Europe ===
At the American Civil War's end, Chaney traveled to Europe in June 1866 for a three-month vacation. During his absence, the Hollis Street Church was closed for renovations. No information on his itinerary or traveling companions, if any, has been found.

=== Charitable work ===
In an era before government-supported social programs, churches played a significant role in aiding the indigent. Boston's Unitarian ministers considered charity work as part of their broader ministry. Noting that Christian charity was “less Sunday work than the work of everyday life.” Chaney reflected this ethic.

==== Flower Mission ====
Chaney's church had a central role in a charitable program called the Flower Mission. Started in England, the Flower Mission was adopted in Boston in 1869. Per the tradition, people gathered flowers and fruit for the sick and poor. Chaney offered the Hollis Street Church as a distribution hub. The Flower Mission was an ecumenical effort among Boston's churches.

==== Hollis Street Church Board of Charities ====
In 1867, Chaney instituted an assistance program overseen by the church's Board of Charities. Per the program, if church members encountered an individual seeking alms, they were to direct that person to the church where they would be registered and receive needed support. Chaney remarked that “he did not know of any better system than this for the distribution of aid.”

==== Benevolent Fraternity of Churches ====
Chaney's Hollis Street Church was a member of Boston's Benevolent Fraternity of Churches. Organized in 1834 by Boston's Unitarian ministers, it coordinated charitable work among its members. It was also a mutual support structure for the ministers of the participating churches.

As the Hollis Street Church minister, Chaney was the president of his church's delegation from 1871 to 1878. Upon leaving his pastorate, his successor, Rev. Henry Bernard Carpenter, became the president of the church's delegation in 1879.

==== Hospital Sunday ====
In February 1874, Chaney was among those who advocated that the Unitarian Suffolk Conference of Churches adopt a collective charitable giving program called Hospital Sunday. Hospital Sunday originated in Birmingham, England in 1859. The Boston churches modeled their program on its English antecedent. Churches designated one Sunday a year to collect funds for local hospitals.

==== Other charitable work ====
Chaney personally participated in other charitable organizations.

- He served on the Executive Committee for Boston's Discharged Soldiers’ Home. The home operated as a private charity from 1862 to 1869, providing housing for Union veterans.
- He was the keynote speaker at the 1865 annual Seaman's Widow and Orphan Association meeting. He would have been familiar with this association, organized in his hometown of Salem, Massachusetts, in 1834.
- He served on committees for the Boston Soldiers’ Memorial Society, organized in 1865 to honor Massachusetts's Union soldiers.
- He was on the Board of Instruction for the Boston School for the Ministry, organized by Rev. George H. Hepworth in 1867. This group encouraged young men “of ability but no means” to enter the Christian ministry.
- He was on the Executive Committee for the Suffolk Union for Christian Work. Organized in Boston in 1868, the Union provided charitable services to the city's “needy and destitute.”

=== Industrial education ===
Aside from his charitable work, Chaney was well-recognized for his advocacy of industrial education. He considered industrial education essential for the “development of body, mind, and soul.” For Chaney, charity's focus was not only on providing immediate sustenance but also offering the means for individuals to support themselves. Speaking at his Hollis Street Church in 1869, Chaney explained his philosophy on charity and education.

In the conduct of Christian charity, the most difficult cases are not produced by sickness, but by want of occupation. The trouble is, less often, that there is nothing in particular for people to do, than that they can do nothing in particular. (bold added)

==== Whittling School - initial program ====
Around 1866, Chaney inaugurated his Hollis Street Chapel woodworking school for boys. The woodworking school was designed to showcase the benefits and cost-efficiency of a manual training program. Since acceptance into the woodworking classes required prior attendance at a Sunday School class, the workshop provided further church engagement with lower-class youth, often referred to as newsboys or street urchins.

Frank T. Roswell, a local business owner, was the school's supervisor. The school consisted of 24 boys working on movable benches with glue, brads, and jack-knives to carve or whittle empty wooden cigar boxes into "pretty wooden panels." Publicly, the program was derisively known as the Hollis Street Whittling School—a name Chaney adopted.

Chaney and Roswell understood that the whittling school was not an industrial educational program. It was a vehicle to demonstrate the benefits of low-cost manual training instruction, a precursor to the formal training of skilled artisans. The strategic aim of the Whittling School was to secure funding for introducing such programs in the public school system.

==== Whittling School - later program ====
Five years later, in 1871, a revamped woodworking program was unveiled. The school upgraded its equipment to fixed benches, a more extensive array of woodworking tools, and facilities for each student to secure their tools. Frank Roswell continued as the school supervisor.

The Whittling School also formally revamped its organizational structure. The school was organized under the guise of the Industrial School Association. The Association was composed of “public-spirited” individuals who shared Chaney's vision of adopting such training in the public school system. Chaney was the Association's president.

Chaney had created what would now be called a “turnkey” solution for a public school to adopt. The program included a manual of woodshop lessons, a new location, and an offer to public schools to defray expenses if they adopted the program.

At a special meeting of the Boston School Board in April 1878, Chaney, along with other supporters, presented this industrial school model, sharing that the Industrial School Association had “perfected a plan for educating boys in the use of mechanical tools.”

Two principals from Boston schools offered their endorsement. Professor Whittaker from the Massachusetts Institute of Technology, established in 1861, also spoke approvingly. The special school board committee indicated that they would consider the “matter” and report at a later date.

Four years later, in 1882, the Boston School Board approved Chaney's petition that $500 be appropriated to adopt “hand-training” in one of its schools.

=== Florida travel ===
In March 1870, Chaney received permission from the Hollis Street Trustees to temporarily vacate the pulpit for health reasons. He resided in Florida until his health was restored. He returned to the pulpit in May.

=== Chaney attempts to end his pastorate ===
In 1875, thirteen years into his Hollis Street ministry, Chaney shared with the church's proprietors that he wished to end his pastorate. Citing the area's changing demographics, Chaney concluded that it was no longer possible to maintain Hollis Street as a family church. The proprietors persuaded Chaney to continue his ministry. They, however, made a substantial concession to Chaney, granting him a ten-month leave of absence starting in December so that he could travel, including a visit to the Hawaiian Islands, then known as the Sandwich Islands.

=== Hawaiian travel ===
In January 1876, Chaney, his wife Caroline, and their five-year-old son traveled to the Hawaiian Islands for a four-month visit. Upon their arrival in Honolulu, they were hosted by Caroline's cousin, Henry Alpheus Pierce (HAP) Carter. HAP Carter was the son of Captain Joseph Oliver Carter, the family's Pacific seafaring merchant captain.

Chaney memorialized this Hawaiian visit four years later in his book Alo’ ha! A Hawaiian Salutation. The book was a travel log, including commentary on Chaney's interactions with locals, expats, and Christian missionaries.

His reflections on the impact of 50 years of Christian missionary work on the local Hawaiian population revealed the centrality that Chaney positioned Christianity as the desired social and moral foundation for society. He wrote:

And it is not enough to justify and glorify all that has been done for them [by Christian missionaries] that in half a century they have risen from superstition, war, and ignorance to the condition of peace among themselves and with all mankind, freedom from idolatry and human sacrifice, general comfort and the nearest approach to universal education known among any people? Nearly every adult upon the island can read and write.

Since Chaney's steamer ship, the Granada, served Sydney, Honolulu, and San Francisco, it is reasonably assumed that he visited San Francisco's Universalist church and the gravesite of Rev. Starr King on the church grounds. Upon the Chaneys' return to the United States, they visited the Philadelphia Centennial Exposition. Little else is known of their travel itinerary.

Chaney resumed his Hollis Street pastoral duties in October 1876.

=== End of Hollis Street Church pastorate ===
A year later, in October 1877, the Hollis Street Church proprietors formally accepted Chaney's resignation. The proprietors thanked Chaney for his 15 years of service, expressed their “admiration of his Christian character,” and their regret for the circumstances that “could not be controlled” that compelled his departure.

Chaney's earlier observations about the viability of Hollis Street as a family church were prescient. In 1884, seven years after his resignation, the final religious service was held in the church. The church was sold and converted into the Hollis Street Theatre. The theater operated until 1935 when it was closed and demolished.

== After Hollis Street ministry ==
After resigning from his Hollis Street pastorate, Chaney did not pursue a full-time church ministry. He occasionally preached at various locations. His longest ministerial engagement lasted six months when he filled the pulpit of Massachusetts's First Parish in Cambridge while its minister, Rev. Francis G. Peabody, traveled in Europe.

He continued to attend annual meetings of the Middlesex Conference and the New York and Hudson River Conference. He published another young man's book, Tom, A Home Story.

In 1879, he spent the summer on his wife's farm in Leominster.

== American Unitarian Association's Southern Strategy ==
In the post-Civil War years, the A.U.A. turned its attention to Southern missionary work. Chaney spent the last half of his career implementing the A.U.A. Southern strategy.

=== Director on A.U.A. Board of Trustees ===
From 1872 to 1883, Chaney served on the A.U.A.’s Executive Committee.

The mission of the A.U.A. was to produce union among liberal Christians, publish and distribute literature, and supply missionaries “especially in such parts of the country as are destitute of a stated ministry.”

The Association was organized with an Executive Committee and various standing committees such as Finance, Publication, Theological Education, and other committees with geographic responsibilities such as New England, Middle and Southern, Western and Pacific Coast states, and Foreign Missions.

Chaney served on the Middle and Southern States, Foreign Missions, and Theological Education committees.

=== A return to the “What is a Unitarian” controversy ===
Chaney was only a witness to the 1865 controversy over the definition of Unitarianism following the formation of the National Conference of Unitarian and Other Christian Churches. Nearly a decade later, Chaney, now a Director of the A.U.A., was a central participant in this resurrected debate.

Due to his responsibility to publish the 1875 Unitarian Yearbook, Chaney was directly involved in the debate on how to define a Unitarian. A standard feature of the Yearbook was a list of Unitarian ministers. Compiling the yearly list of ministers due to its self-reporting feature offered its own challenges. The omission of one minister's name from the previous year's roster re-ignited the debate.

The minister at the center of this debate was Rev. William J. Potter of the First Congregational Society of New Bedford, Massachusetts. Potter, a founder of the Free Religious Association, had made known his position to those preparing the 1874 list of ministers.

Unitarian I am with reference to the Trinity, but Christian, I no longer call myself, and have said so in public.

Based on this communication, the preparers of the ministerial list, without Potter's approval, removed his name from the 1874 Yearbook.

As noted earlier, Chaney held a conservative view that Unitarianism was intrinsically tied to Christianity. At the A.U.A. May 1874 business meeting, Chaney offered a motion to establish a standard for inclusion on the annual list of ministers.

That the word Unitarian, as usually used among us means Unitarian Christian, and that no list of Unitarian ministers is correct which contains the name of any person who is not Christian.

Rev. Edward E. Hale seconded Chaney's motion.

The substance of the debate touched on profound issues on the nature of Unitarianism. Was it Christian? Was Unitarianism merely a branch of the Free Religious Association? It was offered that if the Association had stood on its principled position of being Christian, there would never have been a Free Religious Association. There was also a challenge for anyone to bring forth a definition of “Christian” on which all could agree!

A question also arose on jurisdiction. Who had the authority to decide who to include or exclude a name? Did that authority reside within the American Unitarian Association? Some argued that congregationalism gave the Unitarian church, which called a minister, the right to have their minister listed.

After extensive debate, Rev. Hale declared that consensus had been achieved—"Unitarian minister" meant "Unitarian Christian minister"—just as Chaney asserted. Despite this declaration, Potter's name was returned to the list of Unitarian ministers.

The decision to return Potter's name rested on the very liberty offered by Unitarianism. It was observed that Potter had committed no inappropriate offense. He expressed only a different opinion of the nature of Unitarianism. Rev. Dr. John Cordner, an influential Unitarian leader from Montreal, Canada, argued that examining a minister's opinion would be “trampling individual liberty of opinion underfoot."

Chaney himself opened the door to this decision. The Christian Register reported Chaney's openness to the liberty of an individual to be seen by their actions. “A man who illustrates the temper and spirit of Christianity should be regarded as a Christian.”

Rev. Shippen later offered a lecture entitled “What is a Unitarian?” in which he shared an 1860 quote from Rev. Samuel J. May from New Bedford, Massachusetts:

Unitarianism we believe to be Christianity. We want to get rid of the word Unitarianism and talk about Christianity. We believe that Christ and his apostles knew no other Christianity than Unitarian Christianity.

In his Southern ministry, Chaney emphasized that he brought a message of authentic Christianity, defined as Unitarian Christianity.

=== A.U.A. Southern missionary efforts ===
By the mid-1840s, the A.U.A. had decided that its new missionary efforts would be more productive in the West. Subsequently, for decades, scant resources were devoted to Southern missionary efforts. The issue of slavery was also an obstacle that lessened any chance of developing a Boston-based Southern denominational strategy.

=== Independent antebellum Unitarian societies ===
There were a handful of Unitarian societies in the Antebellum South, but they considered themselves independent from the Boston-based A.U.A. These societies saw the Unitarian Church in Charleston, South Carolina, as the center of their home-grown Southern Unitarianism.

The Unitarian Church in Charleston was established in 1817 as the Second Independent or Congregational Church of Charleston. The church was based on English Unitarianism, expressed by Joseph Priestley, and not New England Unitarianism, which emerged from Calvinistic Puritanism. Fifteen years later, in 1832, the church changed its name to the Unitarian Church of Charleston. Rev. Samuel Gilman led the church for four decades.

The Unitarian societies in Augusta and Savannah, Georgia, were founded through Gilman's missionary work and understandably considered Charleston as the locus of their denominational activity.

Boston claimed the Unitarian Society in Mobile, Alabama as one of its auxiliary societies based on 1835 organizational work by Rev. James Freeman Clarke, a Boston-based Unitarian minister. However, Clarke only gathered together Unitarians who had previously been gathered together into a nascent society. This society considered itself to be within the scope of the Charleston-based association.

The Unitarian society in New Orleans, Louisiana, organized by the energetic and fiercely independent Rev. Theodore Clapp, was its own center of Unitarian and Universalist thinking. The church was founded in 1823 initially as a Presbyterian church with Clapp as its pastor. A decade later, the Presbyterians convicted Clapp of heresy, but his church continued with him. With Clapp in the pulpit, the church underwent a series of name changes, eventually known as The Church of the Messiah in 1855.

== Post-war Southern focus ==
After the American Civil War, the A.U.A. began having aspirational hope of extending its missionary work to the South. However, funding remained modest. In 1880, three years after the conclusion of Southern Reconstruction, only $270 was allocated for Southern missionary work. In contrast, the A.U.A., in that same year, provided over $6,000 for missionary work in the Western states.

The A.U.A.’s first significant Southern expenditure of several thousand dollars was not a planned investment. Instead, it was an unexpected opportunity to revive the church in New Orleans.

The New Orleans society survived Clapp's resignation in 1856, a series of Unitarian and Universalist ministers, and the Civil War. However, it emerged at the end of Southern Reconstruction heavily in debt. When the mortgage was put up at a public auction, the A.U.A. took advantage of this situation and secured the debt at a reduced rate.

== Seed of Chaney's Southern missionary work ==
In early 1881, the A.U.A. started more intentional investment in Southern missionary work by funding two Southern exploratory efforts. Rev. Enoch Powell, who recently served a congregation in New Hampshire, was allocated $100 “for missionary work in Atlanta.” Rev. John W. Heywood was allocated $500 for a more general missionary tour of the South. Six months after Powell's initial Atlanta trip, the A.U.A. directors allocated $1,000 for further Atlanta missionary work and requested that Rev. Chaney lead that effort.

Years later, in a personal reflection, Chaney shared,

They had sent a young minister to spy out the land, who promptly returned with the tidings of 'nothing doing' or to be done in Atlanta. I was then a member of the Executive Board of the Association and very zealous in sending other ministers into the field. “So, for very shame, when I was asked to go myself, I could not refuse.”

== Southern ministry ==
Chaney's Southern ministry spanned the years 1882 to 1894.

=== Early Southern missionary work ===
On January 12, 1881, at the start of Powell's Atlanta missionary work, he placed an advertisement in The Atlanta Constitution reading, “Prominent citizens of Atlanta having expressed a desire to organize a Unitarian church.” (bold added) It has been assumed, but not yet documented, that a request from Atlanta initiated this Atlanta Southern missionary work.

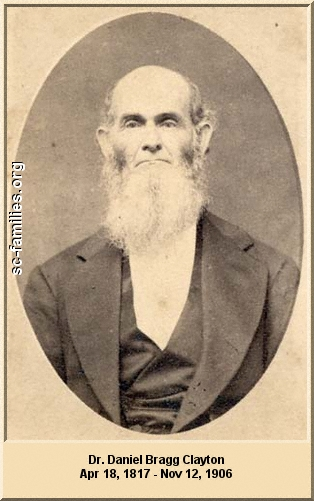
Rev. D.B. Clayton

Although the Unitarians had no presence in Atlanta, a Universalist church had been organized a year and a half earlier in July 1879. This Universalist society was started by W.C. Bowman, a recent convert to Universalism and later aided by Rev. D.B. Clayton, a seasoned South Carolina Universalist preacher.

By the time Powell arrived in Atlanta, the Universalist church was unraveling. Bowman had resigned, and Clayton considered the continuation of the church to be unsustainable. It has been assumed those seeking to continue the presence of a liberal church in Atlanta reached out to the Boston A.U.A. Directors for assistance.

Unlike Bowman and Clayton, who arrived as itinerant preachers, Powell had the support of Georgia's political elite (to be explained later). He preached his first service in the senate chamber in Atlanta's capitol building, courtesy of Georgia's Governor Alfred Colquitt. Clayton also offered Powell the Orphans’ School Hall, where the Universalists had been holding their services.

Powell may have expressed skepticism about establishing an Atlanta presence, but the A.U.A. Directors were more optimistic. Following Powell's departure, the A.U.A. ran an article in the Atlanta paper indicating it would continue efforts to organize a Unitarian church in the city. The article noted the “distinguishing characteristics” of the denomination included freedom from creeds, its belief in progressive religious life, and devotion to philanthropic endeavors.

After Powell's departure, Rev. John W. Heywood traveled to Atlanta on his more extensive Southern missionary tour and continued conducting services at the Universalist Hall.

=== Chaney arrives in Atlanta ===
Chaney arrived in Atlanta in February 1882. His advertisement in the local paper encouraged Atlantans to hear him preach on “Unitarian Christianity.” Like Powell, Chaney was offered the senate chamber in the city's capitol building. He preached his first public sermon on Sunday, February 19, 1882, “Man: How Much is the Worth?”

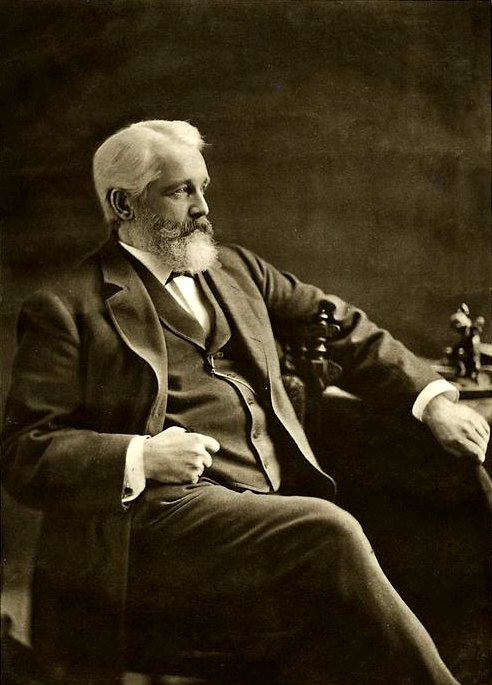
Edward Atkinson

Even before his Sunday sermon, Chaney's reputation proceeded him. Atlanta's elites welcomed Chaney based on earlier business relationships established between Boston Unitarians and Southern business and political leaders.

Two years earlier, in August 1880, a Boston economist and Unitarian, Edward Atkinson, published a letter in the New York Herald discussing the inefficiencies in Southern cotton production. He offered that formal cooperation between Southern growers and Northern manufacturers could remedy this situation.

Henry W. Grady, the influential editor of The Atlanta Constitution, reprinted the New York Herald's comments. He encouraged others, such as Hannibal Kimball, the Atlanta Cotton Factory president and Georgia Governor Alfred Colquitt, to follow up on Atkinson's ideas. The result was Atlanta's 1881 Cotton Exposition. The Exposition included Aktinson's recommendation to house a 720-feet-long and 400-feet-wide model cotton factory in the main exhibition hall.

Chaney positioned his initial introduction to Atlanta as a continuation of the industrial uplifting begun by Atkinson.

In early February 1882, an article in the Atlanta paper emphasized Chaney's background in industrial education, his interest in schools for whites and freedmen, and his relationship with Atkinson. The article noted that Chaney planned to tour and inspect Atlanta's schools and industries.

Four months later, in June 1882, an interview published in The Atlanta Constitution entitled “Hand Education” further cemented Chaney's public image as an industrial educational advocate. Referred to as the “president of the Industrial Education League” (a.k.a. Industrial School Association), Chaney spoke of his efforts to introduce industrial education in the North and the benefits awaiting the Southland if such schooling was adopted. Thus, Chaney entered Atlanta society with a degree of “celebrity status.” He was educated, well-connected in influential circles in Boston, and was welcomed into Atlanta's high society.

In 1885, three years after he arrived in Atlanta, Chaney was elected as a Director of Atlanta's Young Men's Library Association (Y.M.L.A.). This paid subscription library association, established in 1867, was initially open only to white men. The policy was updated in 1873 to admit white women. Chaney served on the board of the Y.M.L.A., holding various positions, retiring from the board in 1890 as president.

Having made his introduction to the Atlanta community through his advocacy of industrial education, Chaney then turned his attention to his mission, which was to raise a Unitarian church in the city.

== Church of Our Father ==
Despite his reception by Atlanta's elites, Chaney's initial gathering of his flock was slow and, at times, dispiriting. After a diligent and hopeful search for supporters, only five people attended his first gathering in the small parlor at his Kimball House hotel. Two Sunday services were then held at the Georgia State Senate chambers, attracting crowds of up to seventy people. Chaney attributed the increase in attendance to a mixture of the limited number of his faithful and the “curiosity” of many who came to hear him.

Afterward, services were held for six months in the reception parlor of Concordia Hall, a venue for theatric performances and general meetings. Chaney described this location as a testing ground for his faithful. Located up “two long, wearisome flights of stairs,” attendees were invited into song with the uncertain support of a pianist.

Chaney described this time as “one crying in the wilderness and awakening few responses.”

In the summer of 1882, Chaney returned to Boston. At the request of the American Unitarian Association, he returned in the fall with a determination that if Unitarianism could not find acceptance in Atlanta, the South may be closed to liberal religion.

Services were then held in the U.S. District Courtroom. The fine appointments of the courtroom were a welcomed change from the austerity of the Concordia Hall reception hall. Attendance remained small, but a core fellowship developed.

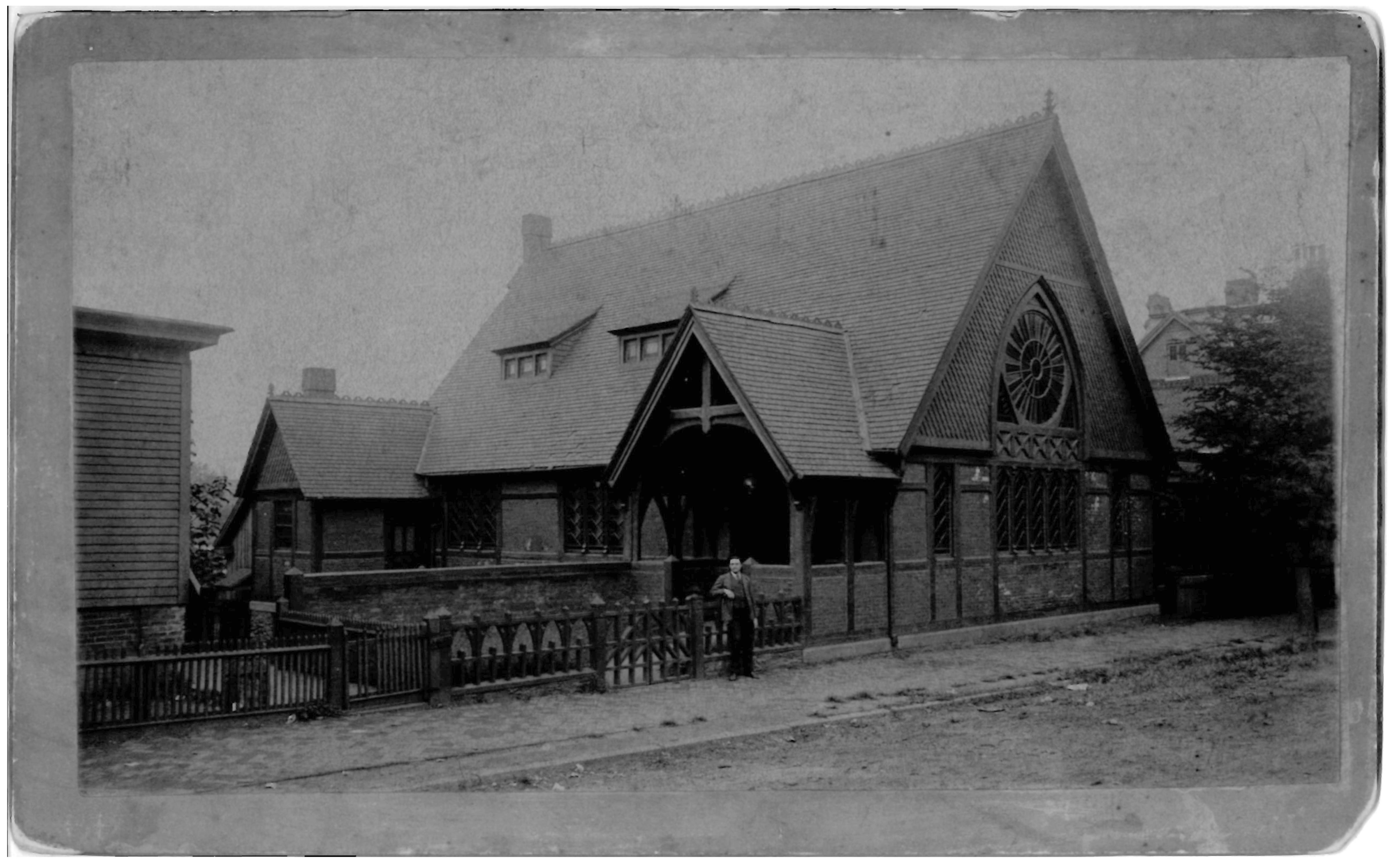
Church of Our Father, Rev. Chaney

In March 1883, approximately a year after he had arrived in Atlanta, 12 people gathered in Chaney's hotel room in the Kimball House, where Chaney announced:

That the time had come for giving organized form to the interest we felt in the establishment of a new church in Atlanta.

With that pronouncement, Atlanta's first Unitarian church,Church of Our Father, was organized.

The mission of the church was:

To maintain the worship of God, to cultivate in ourselves and in one another virtuous affections and habits, and to endeavor to pass our lives in harmony with the Spirit and Life of Jesus Christ.

Shortly afterward, a building committee recommended the purchase of a lot at the corner of Forsyth and Church Streets. With $7,000 in financial assistance from the American Unitarian Association, the lot was purchased from Professor T.E. Means. The lot contained his school building, which Chaney's members used as a temporary meeting location until the construction of their chapel was completed. As Chaney declared, “It was a work of love and faith.”

In April 1884, a chapel was dedicated. Reflecting Chaney's influential connection to Boston's Unitarian leadership, the church visitor list included Rev. Edward Everett Hale, Rev. R.R. Shippen, Rev. George Thayer, Rev. James Freeman Clarke, and others with whom Chaney had personal and ministerial connections.

Chaney remained pastor of the Church of Our Father until November 1890.

Chaney's November 1890 farewell address reflected the Unitarian Christianity he brought to the South. Unlike orthodox Southern Christianity, which embraced a judgmental God, for Chaney, God was loving. “And the God of love and peace shall be with you.” He added, “In building this church, we have named it the Church of Our Father for Him who went about doing good.”

Chaney's pastorate at the Church of Our Father was diligent but unremarkable. Membership modestly grew. Chaney made no apologies for the relatively small size of his flock, stating:

I make no apologies for the comparative littleness of the church to which I belong. In what age of the world was truth ever in the majority? If you continue to live by the faith of your creed, then surely will the God of love and peace be with you.

=== Charitable work ===
Also, in his farewell sermon, Chaney preached that as a “church or individuals, we have had a hand in many of the most useful humane enterprises.”

- Woman's Exchange, established in early 1884, provided a venue where women could directly sell their wares to the public. This program was closely connected with the Women's Industrial Union. As Chaney remarked, “alleviating poverty without sacrifice of their just pride.”
- Women's Industrial Union, located near the church and also organized in early 1884, serviced poor white “factory and shop girls” who earned 15 to 20 cents a day. By acquiring basic sewing, cooking, and other skills, these young women could “earn up to 50 to 75 cents a day with really less work.” Chaney's wife, Caroline, served on the executive board of this organization.
- Industrial Home, located just two blocks from the church, was also established in 1884 as a social program to uplift poor white “street girls” by teaching them practical skills in sewing, cooking, washing, and “various arts of housewifery.” The girls were paid in tickets worth two to eight cents a day, which they could redeem at the end of the week at the program's commissary.
- Home for the Friendless, established in 1888, this organization maintained a building to “furnish a home and support to destitute and friendless women and children.”

=== Industrial education ===
Chaney also reprised the industrial education efforts that he had doggedly pursued in Boston. In February 1884, the Artisans’ Institute was established, with several members from the Church of Our Father serving on the board of directors or as instructors. Unlike Chaney's Whittling School, the Artisans’ Institute had a multi-discipline curriculum, including metal working, mechanical drawing, and woodworking. Forty men, who typically had daytime employment, enrolled in the second evening term of instruction. It appears the school ceased operations in early 1886.

However, Chaney's Southern missionary work was not to establish charities or grow a single Unitarian church. His more ambitious agenda was establishing a Boston-centric Unitarian presence throughout the Southland.

== Southern Conference of Unitarian and Other Christian Churches ==
Chaney, as he had planned, took advantage of the attendance of Southern and Northern ministers at the dedication of the Church of Our Father in April 1884 and chaired an organizational meeting of the Southern Conference of Unitarian and other Christian Churches. With this work, Chaney replicated the conference structure he had helped establish in the mid-1860s during his pastorate at the Hollis Street Church.

The Southern Conference's constitution stated its purpose:

To promote acquaintance and cooperation between the Unitarian churches already existing in the South; to extend towards other Christian churches our brotherly sympathy; to devise means for the friendly correspondence, and so far as possible, the religious conference and comfort of our scattered fellow believers and to prepare ourselves for such opportunities for united religious services as shall be open to us in the future development of this portion of our common country.

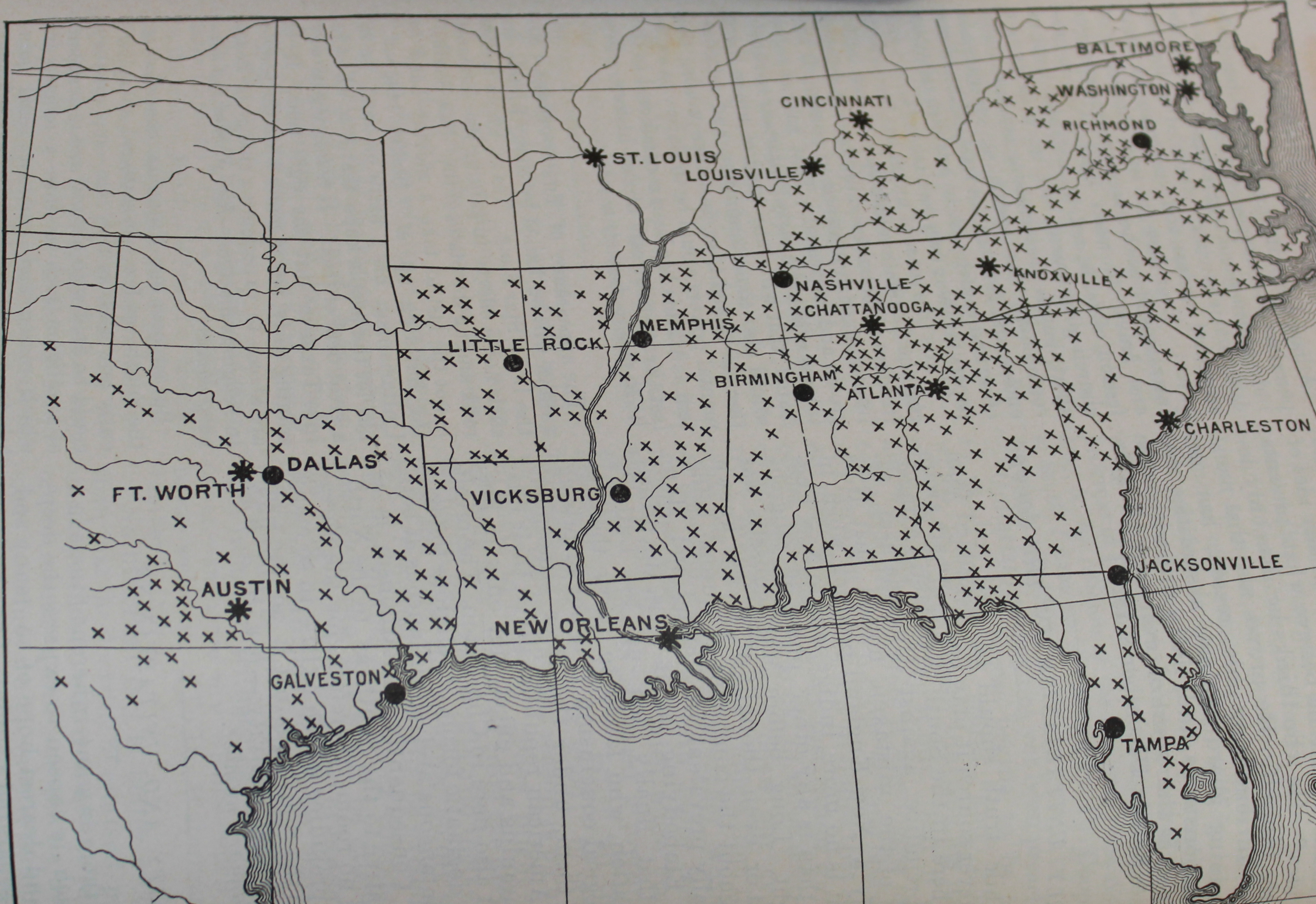
Map of Southern Conference of Unitarian and Other Christian Churched. Asterisk (*) existing Unitarian churches, Dot (•) proposed church, (x) Post-office mission

Chaney provided the leadership for Unitarianism Southern extension work and access to his network of influential individuals from the American Unitarian Association in Boston. Rev. Rush R. Shippen, with whom Chaney served on the board of the American Unitarian Association, attended the dedication and organizational meeting.

Eight months later, in January 1885, the Southern Conference held its first post-organizational meeting in Charleston, South Carolina. Chaney represented Atlanta along with other Southern ministers from Charleston and New Orleans. Reflecting Chaney's standing within the A.U.A., Rev. Grindall Allen, the Secretary of the A.U.A., traveled from Boston to attend.

The conference was well covered in the Charleston News and Courier. The paper, perhaps reflecting hometown pride, correctly asserted Charleston's historical significance in Unitarianism in the pre-Civil War era when it wrote, "The mother church at Charleston entertained the younger churches with characteristic hospitality."

The annual conference rotated to different cities where local newspapers exposed Unitarianism to the public. Rotating the venue allowed Southern ministers and visiting ministers an opportunity to build personal relationships.

In 1916, Chaney reflected on the formidable odds he faced in the formation of the Southern Conference. Success, he confessed, required “more make-believe than reality at the start.” Charleston and New Orleans exited but were "a continent apart." Louisville, Baltimore, and Washington, D.C. were already associated with other conferences. “What was the wherewith,” Chaney lamented,” to make a Southern Conference?”

Though Chaney's 1916 reflection outlined the broad obstacles the expansion of Unitarianism faced in the South, a contemporary 1895 account by Rev. Henry A. Westall, a conference circuit rider, observed the sobering obstacles Unitarianism faced in the South. He commented on the “harsh and stony ground” Unitarian ministers faced, adding, "Nowhere is it a holiday task to plant a Unitarian church in the South.”

Southerners were raised on a religious orthodoxy grounded on an angry God, a fallen man, and an ever-waiting inferno of eternal damnation. For Southerners, Unitarianism was “exotic” and “not native” to the Southland. For these reasons, Chaney's liberal religion, despite its compelling gospel of two commandments, “love to God and love to man,” was to be avoided.

Despite headwinds, the Southern Conference grew of 14 Unitarian societies extending from Virginia to Florida and stretching westward to Texas. Many of these societies had branches of the Southern Alliance Association. A women's organization within the Southern Conference designed to “quicken the life of Unitarian churches” and bring women together for “missionary and denominational work.” The Alliance also maintained a Post Office Mission to distribute Unitarian literature.

== Southern Superintendent ==
In 1890, the A.U.A. appointed Chaney as its Southern Superintendent, a position he held for six years until he resigned in 1896.

Chaney traveled widely in the Southern states, first from his home in Atlanta and later from Richmond, Virginia.

Chaney's annual reports to the A.U.A. provided a snapshot of Southern Unitarianism in the closing decade of the nineteenth century. Chaney reported that the Unitarian Church in Charleston, South Carolina, which had survived the Civil War, had just built a new parish home for its minister. His church in Atlanta, beset by unexpected taxation for city improvements, would benefit from an infusion of $2,000. The Asheville church was looking for a new minister after Rev. F.W. Sanders took a position on the editorial staff of the Unity periodical in Chicago.

Chaney expressed optimism about the extension work in Texas, noting the organization of a society in San Antonio by Rev. W. Schultz. There was additional progress in the state, with Rev. E. M. Wheelock increasing his flock in Austin and Rev. F. Preston preaching regularly in Galveston.

Chaney also commented on obstacles and setbacks. Work in Florida was hampered by the recent retirement of Rev. J.C. Gibson due to the reduction of financial support for his missionary work. Chaney noted opportunities in Pensacola, Tampa, and Jacksonville awaited “a Unitarian ministry.”

Cheney traveled throughout his Southern region to help cultivate new societies. He visited Highlands, North Carolina, and Greenville, South Carolina, “where Unitarian circles have been formed.” He also offered Southern churches counsel, advice and, when needed, temporarily supplied the pulpit for churches that lost their minister through illness or retirement.

Chaney concluded his 1893 report with optimism and a warning of missed opportunities.

In view of all these encouraging signs we sincerely regret that the means of our Missionary Board are so inadequate to the demands made upon them. The field is ready. The laborers are ready. The wherewithal (i.e., money) to employ one another and cultivate the other is wanting.

A year later, in 1894, Chaney noted the progress in forming new societies and the health of existing societies, citing Unitarian churches in Baltimore, Chattanooga, Louisville, St. Louis, New Orleans, and Richmond, where Chaney was also serving as the local minister. Chaney added that the “germ of a Unitarian Church” could be found in Memphis.

He again lamented that progress was impeded by lack of funding and ministers.

Two years later, in 1896, Rev. George Batchelor, Secretary of the A.U.A., attempted to allay concerns about the future of the overall superintendency system. He insisted that the superintendency system “has not failed” but conceded that financial assistance to dependent churches would be “gradually and judiciously discontinued” due to the lack of funds. He went on to report that recent vacancies created by resignations would not be filled. Among those resignations was Chaney's. Chaney alluded to this lack of funding for his Southern-dependent churches as a factor in his resignation.

== The Southern Unitarian journal ==
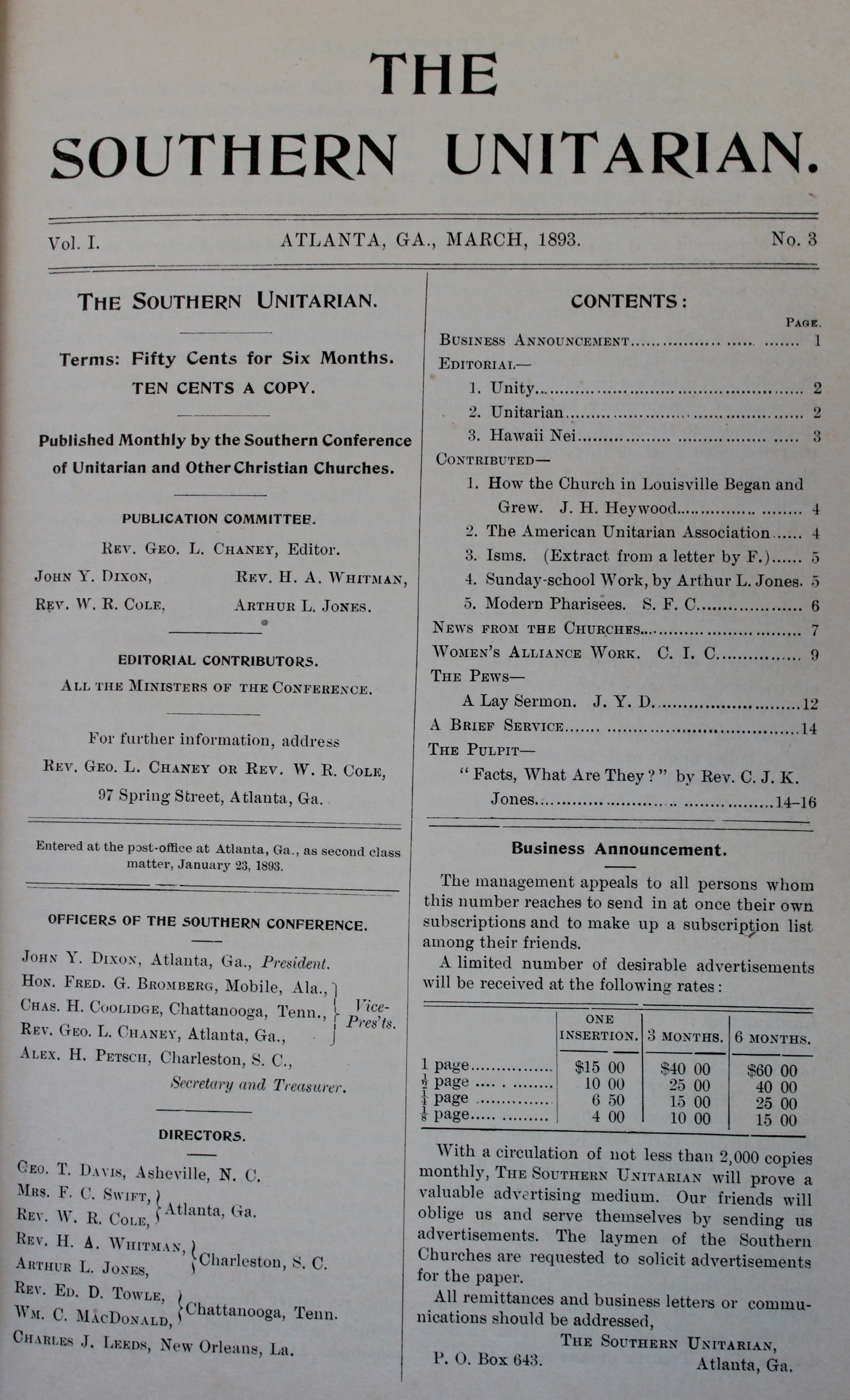
Southern Unitarian, March 1893

In 1893, soon after being appointed as the Southern Superintendent, Chaney began publishing a monthly journal entitled the Southern Unitarian. Printed in Atlanta, it was the official publication of the Southern Conference of Unitarian and Other Churches.

The Conference president, John Y. Dixon, wrote in the January 1893 inaugural edition that this monthly journal was not “strictly speaking” a business adventure but was primarily dedicated to uniting the widely scattered Southern churches.

The editorial staff included Chaney, Rev. William Roswell Cole, who had assumed the pulpit at the Church of Our Father upon Chaney's resignation, Rev. H.A. Whitman from Charleston, South Carolina, and lay members including John Dixon and Arthur Jones. Chaney's wife, Caroline, contributed monthly reports on the activities of the women's Southern Alliance, of which she was president.

The paper ceased publication in December 1895 after publishing three complete volumes.

== Richmond ==
In response to a request from Richmond residents for assistance in forming a Unitarian church, in late 1892, Chaney moved from Atlanta to Richmond, Virginia. Chaney, still the Southern Superintendent, started to conduct services in the parlors of supporting members. By November 1892, services were held in Belvedere Hall, a well-known entertainment center.

Within a year, steps were taken to organize a Unitarian society in the city. On December 31, 1893, after Sunday service, a business meeting was held where Chaney called upon interested individuals to step forward and sign the membership book. Eighteen members did so.

Chaney continued serving the newly formed society as its pastor until the fall of 1894. At that time, Rev. Joseph M. Seaton, a recent graduate of the Meadville Theological Seminary, assumed the pulpit. Although both Seaton and Chaney were listed as the church's pastors, Chaney significantly reduced his pastoral duties and refocused on his duties as the Southern Superintendent.

Although contemporary accounts stated that Chaney's society was the first Unitarian presence in Richmond, those accounts were not entirely accurate. As early as 1824, several Northern Unitarian ministers had visited and preached in Richmond. Six years later, in 1830, John Bovee Dods, a Congregationalist pastor from Levant, Maine, organized local Richmond citizens into the Unitarian-Universalist Society of Richmond. Members asked Dobs to become their minister, but he declined and returned to Maine.

Rev. John Budd Pitkin, also from Maine, accepted the offer to become the church's pastor. Pitkin was more Universalist than Unitarian but ministered to his mixed flock. The church later changed its name to the First Independent Church of Richmond.

Growth was stymied by financial pressures and a succession of transient ministers. In early 1835, Pitkin moved to Florida in an unsuccessful effort to recovery health. Rev. Edwin Hubbell Chapin from New York State served the church from 1838 to 1840. The Richmond City Directory listed the church building as empty from 1850 to 1851. The American Civil War further accelerated the church's decline. By 1874, the First Independent Church ceased to exist as a church.

== Tuskegee Institute ==
Shortly after he arrived in Atlanta in 1882, Chaney established a relationship with Booker T. Washington, the principal of the Tuskegee Institute in Alabama. Within a year, in 1883, Chaney was on the Institute's Board of Trustees.

Founded in 1881 by an act of the Alabama state legislature, the Tuskegee Institute was then known as the Negro Normal School for Colored Teachers in Tuskegee. The mission of a normal school was to train teachers. Washington was educated at Hampton Normal and Agricultural Institute. Upon graduation, Samuel C. Armstrong, the school's founder and principal, recommended the then 25-year-old Washington for the position in Tuskegee.

Chaney's initial appointment to the board resulted from a recommendation made by J.F.B. Marshall, the long-time treasurer of the Hampton school. Marshall's recommendation noted Chaney's philanthropic interests and influential standing in the American Unitarian Association. Washington, who was required to be a prolific fundraiser, would have recognized Chaney as a valuable asset.

Chaney had long been acquainted with Marshall and the Hampton school. In 1870, during Chaney's pastorate at Hollis Street and his involvement in industrial education, Marshall invited Chaney to visit the school in Hampton. Chaney said of his visit that “as an industrial school, it was a model one in every respect.”

Chaney's relationship with Washington and his institute took on many forms. At the school's second anniversary, Chaney delivered the dedication address for Porter Hall, a multi-purpose building housing a chapel, recitation rooms, a library, and a men's dormitory. Chaney frequently accompanied Washington at his fund-raising events in Boston, delivered commencement addresses, and attended other events at the school.

Chaney continued his relationship with Tuskegee long after he retired from ministry and returned home to Massachusetts. He served on the board of trustees from 1883 to 1904.

== Atlanta University ==
Chaney also established a relationship with Edmund Asa Ware, the president of Atlanta University. Atlanta University, since 1988 known as Clark Atlanta University, was started in 1862 by James Tate and Grandison Daniels, two ex-slaves, to provide education to Atlanta's African American children. It was formally organized in 1865, with Ware becoming president two years later.

Chaney was elected to the University's Board of Trustees in 1885. He resigned in 1888.

In an 1882 interview with The Atlanta Constitution, where Chaney emphasized his industrial training expertise, he mentioned Ware and the work of the University to educate the South's freedmen. His comments reflected his educational expectations of formerly enslaved people in the closing decades of the 19th century.

In dealing with the colored race, it is most important that they should be taught useful trades. The professions are not as generally open to them as they are to the whites. There is less demand for colored lawyers, colored teachers, colored salesmen, and colored physicians than for whites.

Also, in that interview, Chaney reinforced his public perception of being a conduit to “Northern money.” Remarking on Ware's desire to implement a department for “practical education,” Chaney added:

I am satisfied that I can raise the money for this purpose in Boston, certainly enough to equip the university with tools and outfit the necessary.

A decade later, in 1898, when W.E.B. DuBois joined the faculty of Atlanta University, this singular focus on manual education was challenged. Dubois's advocacy for higher educational expectations sharply contrasted with Washington's and Chaney's manual training vision. DuBois called for higher education opportunities for the “Talented Tenth” of his race and argued that Washington's “doctrine has tended to make the whites, North and South, shift the Negro problem to the Negro's shoulders . . . when in fact the burden belongs to the nation.”

By the time of this debate, Chaney had already returned to his home in Massachusetts.

== Retirement ==
Following his resignation as the A.U.A. Southern Superintendent in 1896, Chaney and his wife Caroline retired to Salem, Massachusetts, Chaney's hometown. Though they lived in Salem, they frequently spent a part of the winter in Florida or Jamaica and the summers on his wife's farm in Leominster, Massachusetts.

Chaney only occasionally preached and appeared content to tend to his garden and writings.

In 1915, Chaney and his wife traveled again to Atlanta to attend the dedication of the third Unitarian church built in that city. The dedication was most poignant for the Chaneys. The new building included a large stained-glass window known as the Founders’ Windows. On the windows was a dedication inscription that read, “In honor of George Leonard Chaney . . . Caroline Isabel Chaney.”

This Unitarian church building changed owners several times and was finally razed in the 1970s. However, the stained-glass windows were preserved. Sections of the Founders’ Windows are now on display at the Unitarian Universalist Congregation of Atlanta and the Northwest Unitarian Universalist Congregation in Sandy Springs, Georgia.

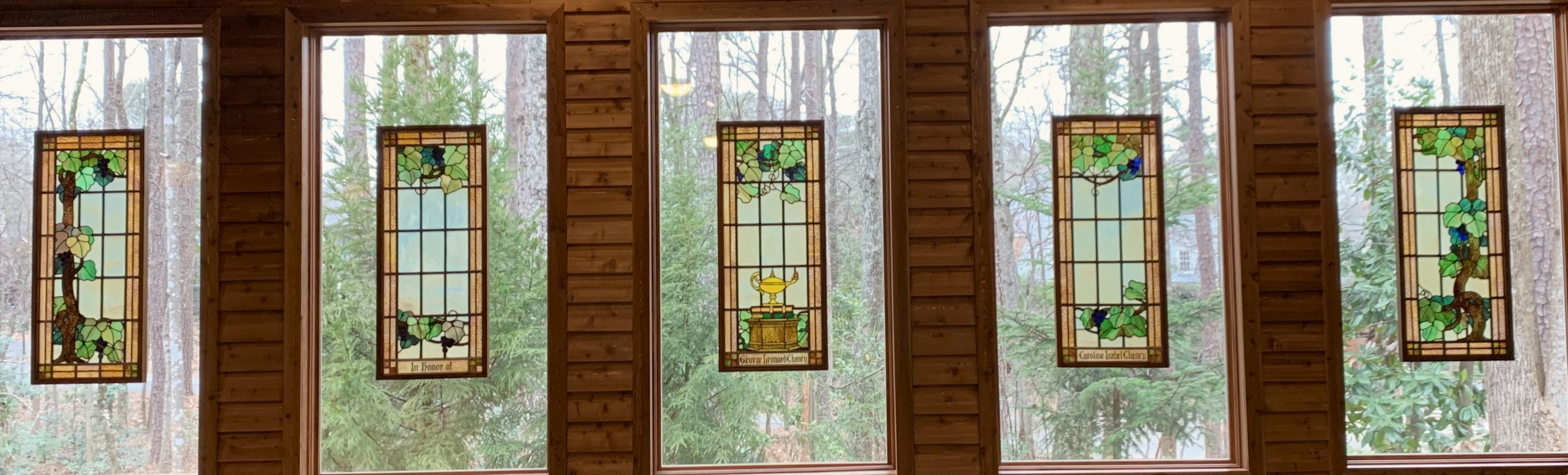
Lower section of Unitarian Church Founders' Window in honor of George Leonard Chaney and his wife Caroline Isabel

== Publications ==
- Hollis Street Church from Mather Byles to Thomas Starr King, 1732-1861: Two Discourses Given in Hollis Street Meeting-house, Dec. 31, 1876, and Jan. 7, 1877 – 1877. A history of the Hollis Street Church in Boston.
- F. Grant & Co., Or, Partnerships: A Story for the Boys who Mean Business – 1866. The book is a primer for young men on how to be honest partners in business.
- Account of the Proceedings at the Dedication of the Children's Mission Home – 1867. This 28-page pamphlet covers the addresses made at the dedication of this charitable home for children.
- Tom, A Home Story – 1877. The book recounts the family life of Tom, his brothers Dick and Harry, his three sisters and his parents. From a contemporary review, “The boys are restless, wide-awake, active little fellows, full of pranks and plans, but sturdy, manly and above meanness.”
- Self-culture, Self-sacrifice and Self-forgetting – 1877. This publication is not a book but the address Rev. Chaney gave at the Hudson River Conference on April 10, 1877.
- Alo’ ha! A Hawaiian Salutation – 1880. The book recounts Chaney's four-month experience in Hawaii.
- Everyday Life and Everyday Morals - 1884. The book contains a series of Sunday evening lectures delivered by Chaney, including these topics: Arts and Morals, Juvenile Literature and Morals, Industry and Morals, Business and Morals, The Stage and Morals, The Press and Morals, and The Pulpit and Morals.
- Beliefs – 1889. The book contains seven sermons delivered by the Rev. Chaney while pastor of the Church of our Father in Atlanta. Sermon topics include Man, God, Christ, The Spirit, Hell, Heaven, and Church.
- “The New South Atlanta,” The New England Magazine, Volume 11, Issue 3 (November 1891). This article is Chaney's reflection on Atlanta.

== Theology ==
George Leonard Chaney considered himself a Christian and believed that Unitarianism embodied Christianity. Unitarianism, he declared, was “the new Protestantism” as it was a reform from within Christianity, not a revolt from outside Christianity. However, Chaney's Christianity differed significantly from orthodox Southern Christianity.

Unitarianism was “pure Christianity", the Christianity taught by Jesus and his apostles. The contours of this “pure Christianity” were explained by Rev. Rush R. Shippen, the American Unitarian Association's Board Secretary, in his 1875 Executive Summary delivered at the 15th annual meeting of the Association.

To our fathers, Unitarianism meant no innovation against genuine Christianity, but the endeavor to break the bondage of church tyranny and middle-aged dogmas, and with reverent freedom and faith to restore and publish anew the original gospel in its pure simplicity. (bold added)

Chaney's Unitarianism was an affirming faith holding an optimistic view of humankind that was capable of failing to achieve its spiritual aspirations but equally capable of rising up and trying again.

Chaney's Unitarianism believed in a loving God. Rev. H.A. Whitman, the minister in Charleston, South Carolina, in 1896, described the contrast between the God of orthodox Christianity, the “God of Moses,” and the God of Unitarianism, the “God of Jesus.” “One is a despotic tribal deity, jealous, and cruel; the other is the loving Father of all.”

Unitarians rejected several tenets of orthodox Christianity:

- The Trinity
- God as a despot
- Humankind's total depravity
- That mortal life was merely a probational preparation for the afterlife
- That Jesus was a sacrificial substitute for the payment for our sins

Chaney's theology reflected these observations.

=== Nature of God ===
Chaney's concept of God was not a judgmental external deity but a spiritual presence found within the consciousness of individuals. The awareness of “God within,” Chaney argued, was through virtuous “moral constants” that resided within the consciousness of individuals:

But there is moral constant . . . in virtue of which the proof and presence of God are felt.

Unfortunately, Chaney's argument for a “God within” is challenging to follow and, at times, complicated by his listing of alternate “moral constants” from “law, right, spirit, and personal identity” or “the principles of mathematics, morals, spirit, and personality.”

What is clear is that Chaney believed in a loving God who resided within us.

=== Christology ===
Chaney was well aware that Unitarian beliefs in Jesus were widely criticized in the South. Orthodox Southern Christianity was firmly based on the belief that Jesus was a member of the Godhead. Chaney's preaching that Jesus was a man was considered outright blasphemy. Chaney responded to his detractors, saying that Jesus was not “merely a man” but a “pure man.”

We teach the humanity of Jesus; understanding that, by an ideal humanity to which mankind is making progress, but which even in its foremost living representatives, it is far from attaining.

This “pure man,” called Jesus, revealed to humankind the nature of a spiritual life.

Jesus has revealed the truth that the way of spiritual life. . .is unselfish love. And that it is a way in which men can walk, God helping them, that is all. And it is all. (Bold added)

Other points on Chaney's views of Christ include

- The son of God in spirit, the son of Abraham and David and Joseph and Mary in body, such I believe, was Jesus.
- God doing mighty works in and through a man; that is the Apostolic presentation of Jesus. I accept it. I believe it.
- And when Jesus comes to his own, "a man approved of God"—son of David as to his body, son of God in spirit.

=== Atonement ===
Chaney emphatically rejected the widely held Christian tenet that Jesus's death by crucifixion was an act of substitutionary or vicarious atonement. He observed that the very notion that “Jesus suffered and died for sinners . . . in their place, has emptied the doctrine of truth and efficacy.”

Jesus's death was not to render payment required by “some unseen power, either God or Devil.” Instead, Jesus's death illustrated God's love for his creations.

In Chaney's theology, love created a unique burden upon those who loved when the shortcomings of a beloved are seen. “It is the penalty of all true love to suffer in all that is faulty in its beloved.”

That is, God so loved humankind that our shortcomings (i.e., sin) imposed a penalty upon God. Thus, God suffered “the consequences of caring so much for the sinner that [God] could not leave him (humankind) in his sin without protest, entreaty, and prostration even unto the death of the cross.”

Chaney reasoned that:

. . . the cross of Christ gains in influence and authority when it is thus seen to be the attestation of love's inevitable penalty, not a device for escaping sin's inevitable woe.

=== The Trinity ===
Chaney did not believe in the central Christian doctrine of the Trinity, which defined one God that existed as three equal and eternal coequals of God the Father, God the Son (Jesus), and God the Holy Spirit.

For Chaney, the Trinity was a “bewildering statement of creed.” The Trinity, Chaney taught, was not part of original Christianity. “We believe in the Bible statements about God and Christ and the Holy Spirit, and not in creed statements” formulated centuries after Jesus's death.

Chaney added that Unitarians “believe in ‘one God the Father’ and in ‘Jesus Christ, his Son’ and in ‘the Holy Spirit’ as a divine influence proceeding from the Father.”

Succinctly, Chaney believed that “unity, not trinity, is the symbol of the real deity.”

=== Nature of man ===
Chaney's faith in humankind's capacity for good stood in contrast to the orthodox Calvinist doctrine that rendered humankind as innately depraved due to Adam's fall; predestined by a sovereign God to either eternal damnation or heavenly bliss.

The critical question in this connection is whether man is a fallen creature, with a natural tendency to go lower; or whether he is an imperfect creature, with an upward motion and destiny.

Chaney deconstructed the story of “the fall of Adam” on various levels.

- Did the Hebrew scripture provide a veritable account of what happened to the first man? Chaney observed, "It seems to me improbable".
- Did Adam's fall account for the presence of evil in the world? Chaney noted, “I do not believe it is true as a fact of history.”
- Chaney, who did not eschew mingling scripture with science, observed that given the “immense antiquity of the earth, and the presence of death long before Adam lived or sinned,” concluded Adam's origin story was neither “history nor science.” Adding that there were “many Adams;” and that humanity “is not all descended from a single pair.”

Chaney saw in man a battle between “brute” and “angel.” A battle in which the “angel” could win. Seen through his ministerial lens, humankind's moral character, the angel character, emerged when man obtained a “consciousness of sin.”

In his sermon on “Man,” Chaney summarized his view of man (i.e., humankind):

Whatever he was or whatever he may become, man is a being amenable to the law of right; capable of virtue; responsive to moving appeals to his humanity; subject to wonder, love, and awe in the presence of worshipful objects or ideas; sensible of his faults and shortcomings; convicted of sin in the presence of ideal goodness; and so loyal to good in his inmost heart that he feels himself a rebel against God in every choice of wrong desire or doing.

=== Original sin ===
Consistent with his optimistic view of humankind, Chaney rejected the orthodox Christian dogma of original sin. Chaney observed that the concept of Adam's fall and its consequential generational sin rested upon the unquestioned acceptance of a few lines of scriptural texts.

Chaney's biblical criticism was more demanding and eschewed the literal reading of Genesis scripture.

=== Personal sin ===
Central to Chaney's teaching on sin was that the consequence of sin was not borne by one's eternal soul but upon the living who suffered a sinner's transgression. That is, Chaney repositioned sin's consequence from one felt in an afterlife experience to one that had an immediate impact on the here-and-now:

I doubt if there is a man alive who could bear the revelation of the harm he does whenever he consents to sin. It would overwhelm him with remorse; he would repent, not because he feared hell, but because he so pitied the victims of his own wrongdoing.

=== Hell ===
In the closing decade of the 1890s, disturbing images of eternal damnation of hell would have resonated with Southerners. Rev. F.W. McClesky, a Georgia Methodist minister, for example, preached that “hell fires have all power to burn terribly, inflecting fearful bodily torture.”

Chaney rejected such depictions of hell. “It is monstrous, untrue, maddening; no lover of God will believe it of him.” For Chaney, retribution for sins is incompatible with the infinite love and fatherhood of God.

Chaney observed:

But if endless torment for transient wrongdoing, punishment that has no care for reformation, consequences that divine love cannot redeem and overrule for good. . .eternal woe, a foil for eternal bliss — if this be hell, I do not believe it.

=== Biblical authority ===
Chaney's Southern missionary efforts repeatedly faced criticism that Unitarians did not “believe in the Bible as the word of God.” Chaney offered that a literal reading of the Bible would make God responsible for all the “imperfections in chronology” and “obvious inequalities of moral and spiritual insights.”

Chaney declared that the Bible was a body of rich religious literature of “unequal value,” providing a record of the evolution of religious beliefs. Although providing religious insight, the Bible should not be considered a “final authority” on religious interpretation. Instead, Chaney stressed that Unitarianism gave individuals permission to use their “own reason and conscience in the discovery of truth and the practice of righteousness.”

Chaney cautioned that the truth in the Bible is offered like a precious ore. It must be worked to reveal its value.

== Death ==
Rev. George Leonard Chaney died in Salem, in the house in which he was raised, at age 86 on April 19, 1922. His wife, Caroline Isabel Carter Chaney, outlived her husband by three years, dying on December 26, 1925, at her family farm in Leominster, Massachusetts.

They are buried in the Harmony Grove Cemetery in Salem, Massachusetts.

== Myths ==
Although Chaney's ministerial and administrative careers were well documented in contemporary periodicals, three myths have persisted.

=== Associated charities ===
Myth: Chaney founded the Associated Charities in Boston.

In 1867, Chaney instituted an assistance program overseen by the church's Board of Charities. Per the program, if church members encountered an individual seeking alms, they were to direct that person to the church where they would be registered and receive needed support. Chaney remarked that “he did not know of any better system than this for the distribution of aid.”

This program was remarkably similar to a broader and more formal approach instituted twelve years later in 1879 called the Associated Charities. The Associated Charities was an umbrella structure that coordinated the charitable work of Boston's church and non-church organizations. Under the Associated Charities program, indigent persons were required to register on the Associated Charities rolls. Once registered, they would receive support and access to training to develop self-supporting skills.

The similarities between the two programs may account for an inaccuracy in some historical reports in which Chaney helped establish the Associated Charities. Instead, Unitarian minister Rev. Edward Everett Hale, pastor of the South Congregational Church, was instrumental in forming the Associated Charities. Chaney is not mentioned in contemporary reports at the formation of this uber-charitable organization.

=== Library open to Whites and Blacks ===
Myth: Chaney established a free lending library for women and African Americans at the Church of Our Father.

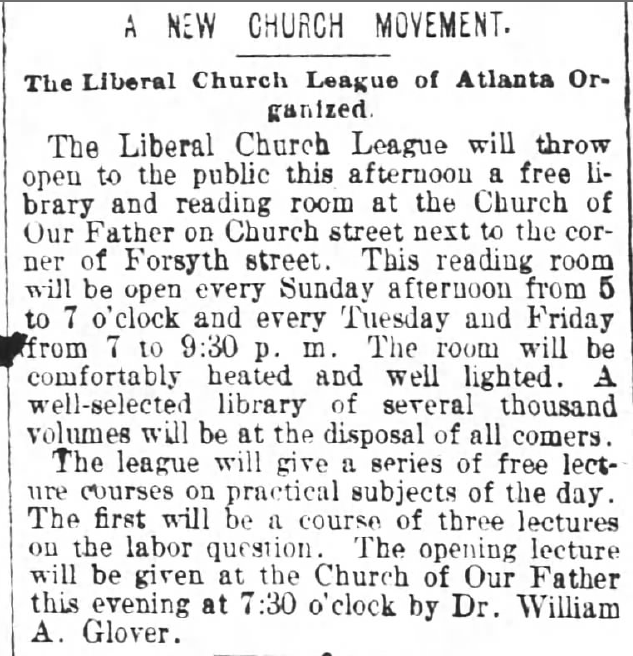
Advertisement by the Church of Our Father Liberal Church League for its free lending library

The source of this myth has not been identified, but it has persisted in scholarly papers and other online references. For example, a well-researched 1982 paper, Unitarian Universalism: The First Hundred Years in Atlanta, stated that Chaney “started the first free lending library which was also the first library open to women and blacks.”

The Church of Our Father did have a small library during Chaney's pastorate (1882–1890). Known as the Parish Library, it was open only to members. It was also a vehicle to lend out Unitarian literature to prospective converts.

A free public library was established during the pastorate of Chaney's successor, Rev. Roswell Cole (1891–1895). At that time, there was a larger effort to “rebuild” the church membership and finances. To that end, male church members had been organized into a “working committee” known as the Liberal Church League.

It was under the guise of the Liberal Church League that the free, public lending library was launched to raise the profile of the church and attract new members. The church ran a month-long advertising campaign in the Atlanta papers to that end. Though the newspaper campaign did not mention any restriction on who could use the library, given the norm of Atlanta's highly segregated society, a “membership program” that desegregated church membership would have sparked highly visible public and intense church debates.

There was no mention in the church's meeting minutes or articles in local Atlanta press alluding to the opening of a segregated library

=== Georgia Institute of Technology ===
Myth: Chaney's Artisans’ Institute was the forerunner in the Georgia Institute of Technology (Georgia Tech) organization.

This myth is found in Chaney's obituary notices published in various newspapers and then, based on those references, repeated in scholarly papers and other online references. The source of this myth has been traced to Chaney himself.

In his November 1890 farewell address to the Church of Our Father, while recounting accomplishments, Chaney affirmed “the Artisans’ Institute which led the way for the School of Technology.” The following day, when the paper printed a letter from Chaney in which he pointed out errors in the earlier reporting of his farewell address, Chaney did not amend his remarks about the Artisans’ Institute.

In an 1894 article penned by Chaney in the Southern Unitarian entitled “A Decade of Church Building in Atlanta, GA,” Chaney again attributed the Artisans’ Institute as the seed “out of which grew the interest which culminated in Georgia's grand School of Technology.”

Years later, in 1916, Chaney's recollection of his time in the South was read into the record at a Southern Conference in Richmond. In those remarks, Chaney again noted, "The Artisans’ Institute, which began in our church, laid the foundation for the Georgia Institute of Technology, now the pride and reliance of the State.”

Unfortunately, contemporary reporting and verifiable information do not support Chaney's assertions.

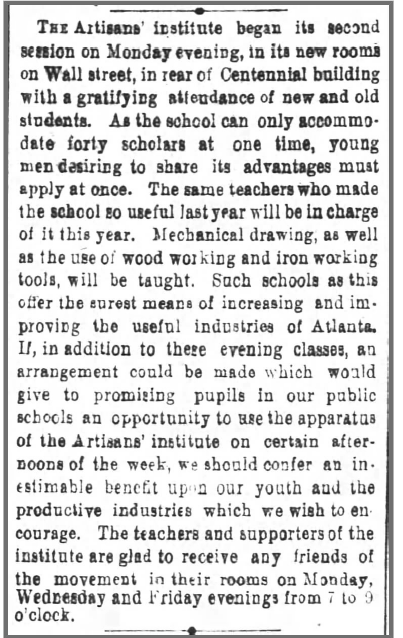
Advertisement for the second season for the Artisans' Institute

The Artisans’ Institution, founded in 1885, was a short-lived school and unlikely to have made an impression on the general public. The Georgia Machinery Company that housed the school declared bankruptcy, and its assets were sold at a public auction on May 4, 1886. After that date, no further advertising for the Artisans’ Institute is found in the local papers.

Chaney did not participate in any of Georgia Tech's key organizational activities. In October 1885, the Georgia legislature established the school, then known as Georgia School of Technology. The legislation did not, however, establish the location of the new technology school, sparking petitions from Macon, Columbus, Athens, Milledgeville, Atlanta, and other cities to be selected.

Chaney was mostly absent from Atlanta during this period of active lobbying. When in town, his sermon topics gave no hint that Chaney was engaged in the debate. As debate on the school's location intensified, Rev. Chaney departed Atlanta for his summer vacation and to attend a Unitarian conference in Saratoga, New York.

The supporters of this new Georgia technology school would not have sought out Chaney for his New England-based funding-raising prowess. Unlike the education of “colored people” promoted by Rev. Chaney, the new technology school would serve a white Southern population and find a ready base of Southern support. Rev. Chaney, in his 1891 “The New South Atlanta” article in The New England Magazine, confirmed that funding for the Atlanta technology school was secured by “munificent contributions of its (Atlanta) citizens.”

Finally, in a review of the news accounts on the opening of the technology school on October 6, 1888, there is no mention of the Artisans’ Institute or Rev. Chaney. The same is true two years later, in June 1890, at the first commencement, which was extensively reported in local papers.

It remains unclear why Chaney thus described the role his Artisans’ Institution played in the organization of the Georgia Institute of Technology.
