= Hollis Street Church =

Church building in Massachusetts, United States

Coordinates: 42°21′0.22″N 71°3′52.14″W

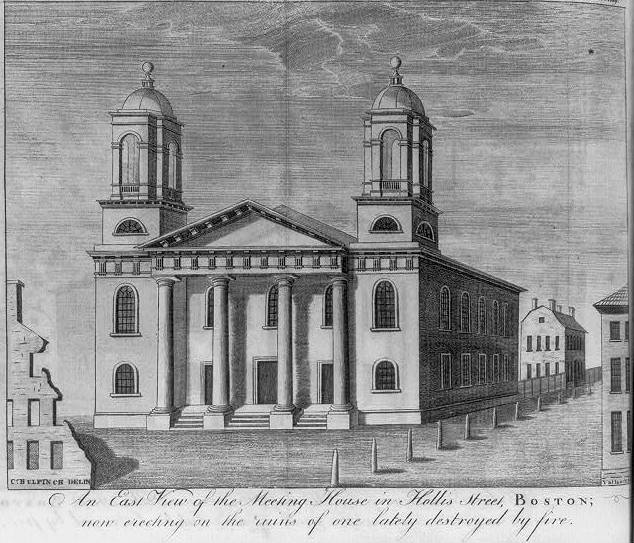
Hollis Street Church, 1788

The Hollis Street Church (1732 - 1887) in Boston, Massachusetts, was a Congregational (1732 - c. 1800) and Unitarian (c. 1800 - 1887) church. It merged with the South Congregational Society of Boston in 1887.

== Brief history ==
=== 1732-1825 ===
In the early years of the church, pew-holders included Benjamin Church, Caleb Davis, and Benjamin West. A fire in 1787 destroyed the church building. Architect Charles Bulfinch designed the replacement in 1788.

In 1810–1811, a brick building replaced Bulfinch's wood structure. "The wooden age yields to the brick; comfort now aspires to elegance." The old Bulfinch building "was purchased by the Union Religious Society of Braintree and Weymouth, ... taken down piece by piece, floated on a raft to Braintree and rebuilt on Quincy Ave near Commercial St. next to the railroad tracks. The church design was slightly altered and a new bell, forged by Paul Revere, was placed in the clock tower. First services were held in the church in November 1810."

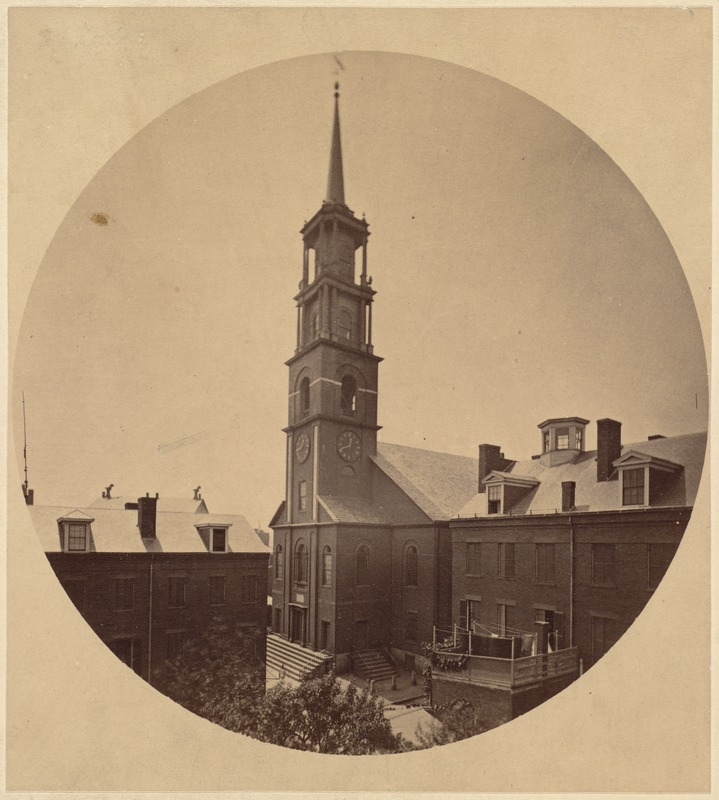
Hollis Street Church, 1860

=== 1825-1887 ===
By 1825, some of the congregation sought to create another church to alleviate overcrowding, and so established the South Congregational Society. In 1883-1884 the church congregation erected a new building in the Back Bay area of Boston, on Newbury Street at Exeter Street. It was designed by architect George Meacham. Ministers included Edward Everett Hale. In 1887 the New Hollis Street Church congregation joined the South Congregational Society, which in 1925 merged with the First Church of Boston. The old Hollis Street building was sold, and later the site became the Hollis Street Theatre.

== Ministers ==
- Mather Byles (1732-1777)
- Ebenezer Wight (1778-1788)
- Samuel West (1789-1808)
- Horace Holley (1809-1818)
- John Pierpont (1819-1845)
- David Fosdick (1846-1847)
- Thomas Starr King (1848-1860)
- George Leonard Chaney (1862-1877)
- Henry Bernard Carpenter (1878-1887).

== Gallery ==
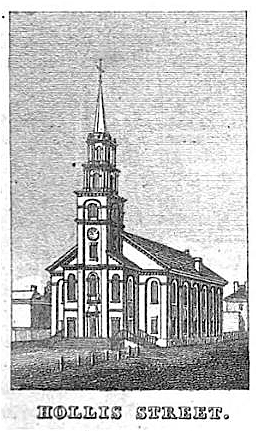
Hollis Street Church, 1838

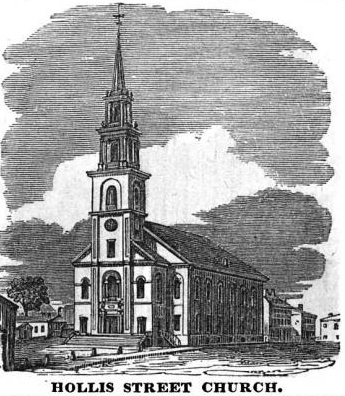
Hollis Street Church, 1851

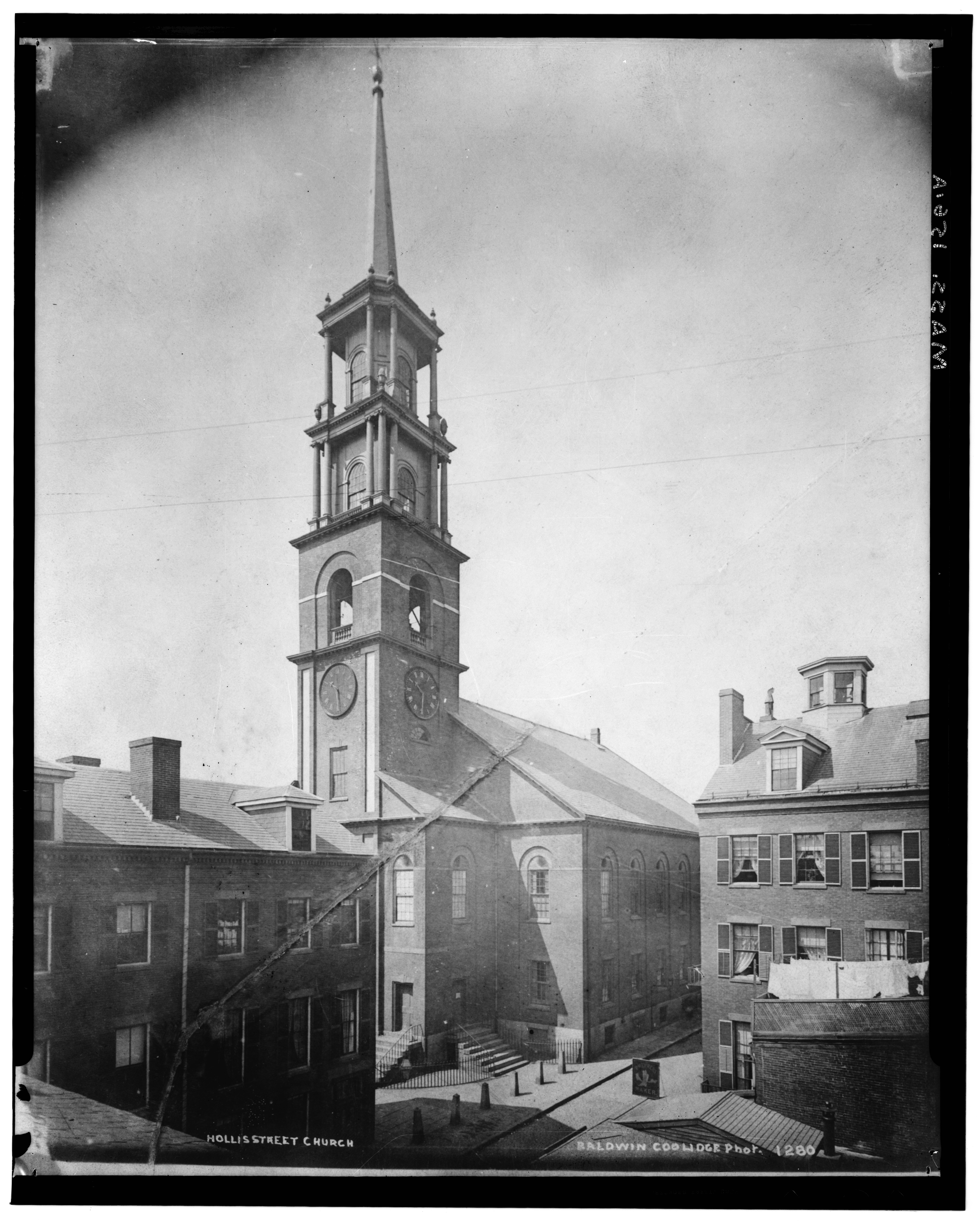
Hollis Street Church, c. 1870

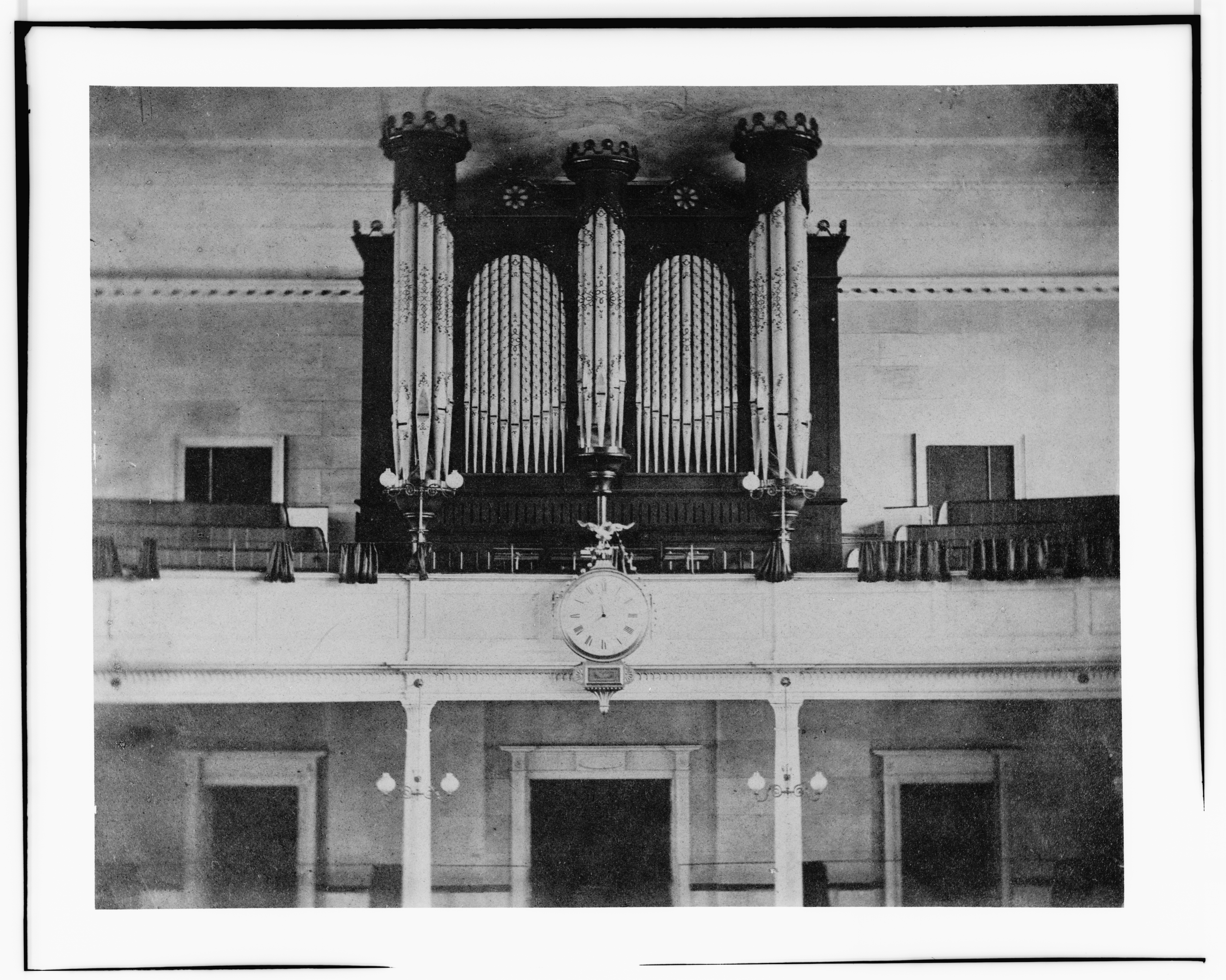
View of organ, c. 1870

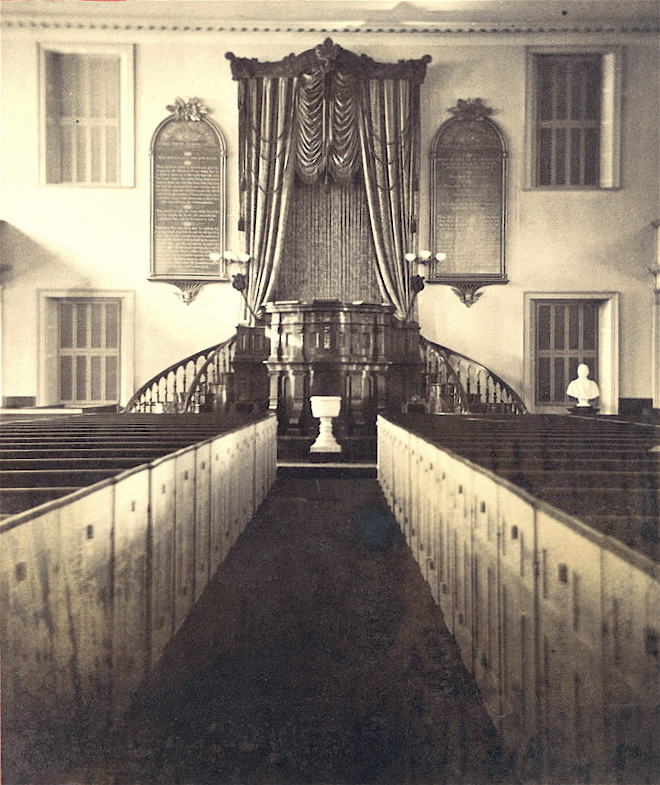
View of pulpit

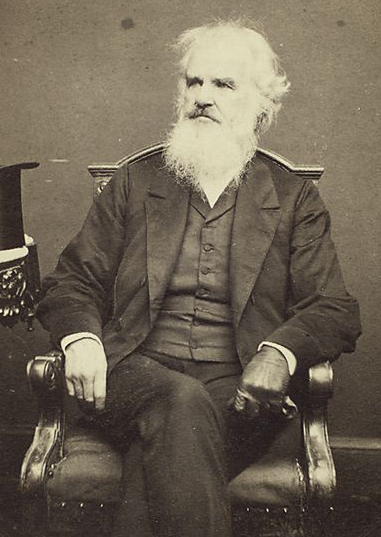
Reverend John Pierpont
