= Northwest Unitarian Universalist Congregation =

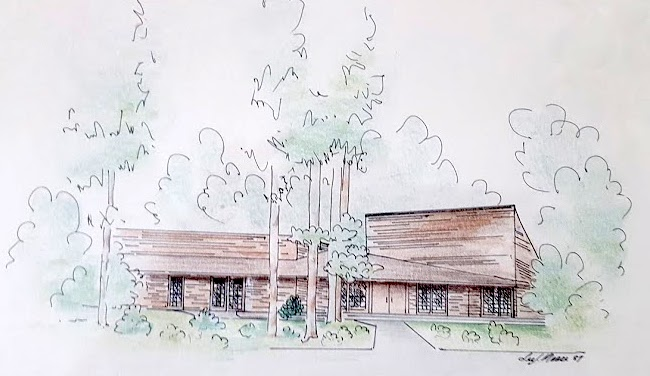
- Northwest Home in the Woods
- Northwest Unitarian Universalist Congregation
- 33.90257°N 84.42047°W
- Location: Sandy Springs, Georgia
- Country: United States
- Denomination: Unitarian Universalist

History
- Founded: January 1969

Northwest Unitarian Universalist Congregation (Northwest) was organized in 1969. The organization of Northwest was the result of action taken by the Unitarian Universalist Congregation of Atlanta (UUCA) to establish a new congregation in the northwest suburbs of Atlanta.

Sunday services and religious education programs were initially held in rented spaces. In 1976 the congregation moved to its newly constructed facility on a five-acre wooded lot in Sandy Springs, Georgia. In 1987, an additional building called the Chalice House was built to support the congregation's religious education program.

In 2000, Northwest was designated as a Welcoming Congregation ensuring that the LGBTQ community could find a spiritual home at Northwest. In 2011, Northwest was recognized as an Accredited Green Sanctuary.

Northwest is a Fair Share Congregation of the Unitarian Universalist Association (UUA).

== History ==
=== Growth at the Unitarian Universalist Congregation of Atlanta ===
In January 1966, when the Unitarian Universalist Congregation of Atlanta (UUCA) moved into its newly built facility at 1911 Cliff Valley Way NE, Atlanta, Georgia, Sunday attendance reached 480 with 391 children enrolled in the religious education program. Over the next several months, membership growth continued. On September 11 of that same year, two Sunday services were implemented. The second Sunday service was considered only an interim step to address overcrowding with the ultimate solution being the establishment of another congregation or fellowship.

It was anticipated that this two Sunday service configuration would accommodate a congregation of 800 – 1000 members. In March 1967, UUCA minister Rev. Eugene Pickett reported that membership stood at 781.

To accommodate anticipated future growth, the Long Range Planning Committee investigated holding a third Sunday service. However, to minimize impact on the new facility and reduce scheduling complications, it was recommended that a third service be held off site and be the basis for establishing a new Unitarian Universalist society.

In the fall of 1967 with UUCA Sunday attendance averaging 750—900, a new society called the Central Unitarian Society was established. This new society initially met at the Georgia Tech YMCA on 10th Street, but later relocated to the Fulton County Medical Building at 875 West Peachtree Street. This new society, however, failed to relieve growth pressures at UUCA.

At a congregational meeting in January 1968, the following resolution offered by the Long Range Planning Committee was adopted:

"The Unitarian Universalist Congregation of Atlanta should establish another service for the congregation to be held in the Northwest area of Fulton County. The purpose of such a service would be (1) to meet the expanding demand for a Unitarian Universalist service convenient to a large number of existing and potential members and (2) to provide the basis for the eventual establishment of an independent congregation. The new service should be targeted to begin in February, 1968."

=== Northwest initial organization ===
On February 25, 1968, the first Northwest Service was held in rented space at Liberty Guinn School at 4829 Long Island Drive, Sandy Springs. UUCA ministers Rev. Eugene Pickett and Rev. Toby Van Buren provided pulpit support along with third party outside speakers. The religious education program was held in a nearby day care center owned by a church member, Helen Correl. As was the custom at this time, there were no Sunday services during the summer. Northwest resumed Sunday services and its religious education program in September in rented space at Sandy Springs High School, 227 Sandy Springs Place NE. Services continued at this location until the congregation moved into its own church facility.

Bylaws were adopted in January 1969 with the new society being named Northwest Unitarian Church by a majority vote. Northwest Unitarian Church, Inc. was formally chartered in Fulton County, Georgia on May 29, 1969. Northwest was soon recognized as an independent congregation by the UUA. The mission of Northwest was “to foster liberal religious attitudes and living through worship, group study, cultural activity, service, work and recreation.”

=== First ministers ===
Northwest's first minister was Rev. William DeWolfe (January 29 – March 18, 1969) who served under a Minister-on-Loan program from the First Unitarian Church of San Antonio, Texas. Northwest Unitarian Church, Inc. was formally chartered in Fulton County, Georgia on May 29, 1969. DeWolfe noted in his departing words that the new congregation was still "psychologically a child of Cliff Valley" and encouraged Northwest to seek a more independent identity from UUCA.

Northwest continued to evolve into a separate religious entity holding regular board of trustees and committee meetings as well as fund raising. The congregation called Rev. John Burciaga (1969—1971) as its first full-time minister.

=== Land purchased and new building ===
At a May 17, 1970 congregational meeting a motion carried by a two-thirds vote to start a $30,000 capital campaign to purchase property for a church building. At that time Northwest was considering a lot at 3584 Mill Creek Road, NE, Atlanta. Efforts to purchase this property were abandoned when it was not possible to secure a zoning variance to re-purpose the existing structures on the property as a church.

In June 1971, an alternate five-acre wooded site was purchased at 1024 Mt. Vernon Highway NW in Atlanta (now Sandy Springs). The new building was dedicated in March 1976.

=== Centuries-old historic stained glass windows ===
In 1974 when Northwest called its second minister, Rev. Bob Karnan (1974—1983), did not have its own church facility. A church-themed restaurant called the Abbey was selected for Rev. Karnan's installation in part due to the restaurant's historic significance. Located on West Peachtree Street in Atlanta, the Abbey occupied the church building initially erected by the Unitarians in 1915. Located at the west end of the building were stained glass windows known as the Founders' Windows. These windows were dedicated to Rev. George Leonard Chaney and his wife Caroline Isabel Chaney for their successful efforts in establishing the first Unitarian church in Atlanta in 1883.

In 1977 the Abbey was purchased by the Metropolitan Atlanta Rapid Transit Authority (MARTA) and identified for demolition as part of Atlanta's construction of a rapid rail transportation system. Prior to the building's demolition, Rev. Karnan secured on indefinite loan from MARTA the Founders’ Windows. In his letter of thanks to MARTA on October 31, 1978, Rev. Karnan commented that the windows provide a “historical link to our heritage and history in the Atlanta Area.”

In November 1979, the lower section of the Founders’ Windows that include the inscription “In Honor of George Leonard Chaney Carolina Isabel Chaney” was installed in Northwest's sanctuary.

=== Name change and Chalice House ===
At the October 23, 1977 Congregational Meeting, Northwest replaced the term "Church" in its name with "Congregation." At the May 20, 1990 Congregational Meeting, Northwest again changed its name, adding "Universalist" becoming known as Northwest Unitarian Universalist Congregation.

By the early 1980s, growth in membership and the Religious Education as well as renter utilization of the building required an expansion of the facilities. A new structure was erected on the property to support the religious education program. In 1987 the building was dedicated as the Chalice House, providing a chapel and needed classroom space.

== Financial challenge ==
The construction of the Chalice House, however, ushered in an era of financial instability. By 1990, the funds generated by the three-year capital campaign for the Chalice House had been collected and applied to debt service. Nonetheless, the congregation's total indebtedness was nearly $300,000. The fiscal challenges arose from remaining debt on the construction of the original sanctuary main building, unfunded costs for the construction of the Chalice House, higher than anticipated non-payment of annual member pledges compounded by the loss of a long time renter, Gateway School. Due to several factors, Northwest was unable to secure a continuing rental agreement with the Gateway School. Through congregation-wide efforts including an extended capital fund drive, member loan program, Miracle Sunday and an increase in pledging, the congregation regained its financial footing. By 2007, the congregation was debt-free.

The fiscal difficulties in the early 1990s gave rise to a renewal of congregational commitment. A women's group was formed and a retreat to The Mountain Retreat and Learning Center, a Unitarian Universalist associated entity, was held with a vow "Northwest will not fail." Such retreats continued for several years. During the ministry of Rev. Roy Reynolds (1992–2000) the congregation revised its mission to "Promoting religious freedom, spiritual growth and ethical action." In 1996, the main sanctuary building was remodeled providing, additional kitchen and bookstore space.

== Religious education ==
From its founding, Northwest has placed an emphasis on religious education. The original January 1969 by-laws of the congregation included the position of director of religious education (DRE) and a Religious Education (RE) Committee. Martha Spencer was the first lay leader to chair the RE Committee that oversaw youth religious education and nursery activities. Two year later in November 1971, the RE Committee, now chaired by Joyce Buis, reported that 20 adults had volunteered as RE teachers and the RE program had a youth enrollment of 126 with an average Sunday RE attendance of 78.

A brief recounting of these early days of the Northwest RE program was prepared in 2010 by the then DRE Elizabeth Hickman, the daughter of Joyce Buis.

"When we began, we had no building, of course, so we met in Liberty Guinn Elementary School, which is between here (Sandy Springs, Georgia) and downtown Atlanta. Adult services took place in the cafeteria and RE around the corner in Helen Correll's kindergarten and the daycare center on Roswell Road. Helen was a member of our group. We weren't at Liberty Guinn long, maybe a few months, when we moved to Sandy Springs High School. Some of you may know where that building was, up the hill a little way behind Dunkin' Doughnuts on Roswell Road. Once again, we had services in the cafeteria, but now RE classes met in the schoolrooms."

After the 1976 dedication of new church building, the RE program moved to their new dedicated classroom space. Seven years later in December 1983 it was reported by DRE Joan Armstrong that the RE program had grown faster than the congregation's membership. With RE registration at 140 children and room for only 100 students, a call was made by President Robert Styron at the December 11, 1983 Annual Meeting for more classroom space. The RE space problem was again a topic of the December 1984 Annual Meeting. The RE Committee reported that 50% of the RE enrollment was in grades seven to twelve. The use of mobile classroom space was discussed as one potential solution. The vice-president of the RE Committee, Dave Rigg, reported, "As we close out 1984 and look ahead to 1985, we must address some issues not as a Religious Education Committee, but as a Congregation." By March 1985, RE enrollment was 160 with an average Sunday attendance of 100. RE space allocation was further complicated by the weekday rental of classroom space in the church building to Gateway, a private school.

In March 1985 the Building Feasibility Committee responded to the RE space situation by proposing a new two-story structure on the Mount Vernon property with ten classrooms, kitchen, offices and storage facility. To recoup the $250,000 in construction costs, it was further proposed that Northwest enter into a ten-year lease with Gateway. Construction was assumed to be completed by September 1985. After considerable discussion at the March 24, 1985 Annual Meeting a motion was adopted to proceed with the plan submitted by the Building Feasibility Committee. Northwest accepted responsibility for raising and / or acquiring a loan for the building costs. A capital campaign was launched.

In January 1987, during the ministry of Rev. Rolfe Gerhardt (1984–1988), construction began on the building that was dedicated in the summer of that same year. The final building was modified from the original concept and contained eight classrooms, a chapel, bathrooms, a wrap-around deck and storage facilities. A more significant development was the failure to acquire the long-term lease with Gateway. In the end, no lease was signed and the funding burden fell on Northwest as explained earlier in this article.

Despite the financial challenge the RE Program moved into their new facility now called the Chalice House. Enrollment had stabilized. Emphasis was now placed on a more enriching RE program including a Children's Chapel, a children's summer program and youth choir as well as additional RE teacher training.

Three years after its peak, Sunday attendance dipped amid the financial challenges at the congregation. By 1990 with Susan Randolph as DRE, RE Sunday attendance was on the rise again averaging 77 students with registered families rising from 47 to 53 with 19 families attending regularly but not formally registered. The 15 member youth choir continued and other programs such as Secret Friends, youth participation in Atlanta's Hunger Walk and participation in the international UNICEF program were implemented. Pat Kahn became DRE in 1996 and by 1999 RE enrollment had grown to 145 children.

However, by 2000, after the departure of Pat Kahn and some short-lived DRE administrations, children registered in the RE program dropped to 62 with an average Sunday attendance of 33. At this time a middle school program on sexuality called Our Whole Lives (OWL) was introduced. A year later at the May 2002 Annual Meeting it was reported RE enrollment had dropped to 40 children with an average Sunday attendance of 24. From 2002 to 2011, short-lived DRE administrations and lay leaders characterized the leadership of the RE Program.

Elizabeth Hickman, the daughter of founding member Joyce Buis stepped up and served at DRE from 2011 to 2016. In May 2017, Christina Barnum-Martin became Northwest's DRE. The number of young children participating in the religious education, reflecting the family profile of Northwest, has grown from 42 children in 2013 to 72 children in 2018.

== Social action ==
Northwest has long engagement in social justice issues.

In the later 1970s and early 1980s Northwest was engaged in social issues such as the display of religious symbols in public spaces and concern for the rising politicization of religion in social issue. Northwest minister Rev. Karnan commented, “Everyone has the right to state their views about religion and politics, but I am concerned about the confusion of religion and politics.”

Other social justice actions include.

=== Welcoming Congregation and equal access to marriage ===
In 2000, Northwest completed the process to be designated a Welcoming Congregation, ensuring that members of the LGBTQ community could find a spiritual home at Northwest.

However, to protest the Georgia state legislature's refusal to legalize same-sex unions, Northwest minister Rev. Don Southworth announced in 2003 that he would sign no marriage licenses, gay or straight. Rev. Southworth noted that, “A system that does not allow lifelong partners to be at their loved one’s bedside when the die, a system that deprives people of custody of their children, ownership of their homes and the same basic rights that I have as a heterosexual, is evil.”

In 2015, Northwest again took a position of protest over Georgia state legislature's proposed "Religious Freedom Restoration Act" due to its potential to legalize discrimination by business owners based on religious objections. Northwest minister Rev. Terry Davis (2012–2017) joined 200 other area faith leaders in their public protest of the proposed legislation.

=== Donate the Plate ===
During the ministry of Rev. Don Southworth (2001–2006), the Donate the Plate program was implemented, whereby a part of the Sunday collection was donated to social justice programs and organizations that reflect Unitarian Universalist principles. That program has continued and over the years more than $100,000 has been donated.

=== Green sanctuary ===
Northwest commitment to the environment was recognized in 1992 when Northwest was recognized by the Sandy Springs Clean and Beautiful program as the Recycler of the Year.

The Earth Ministry became an official congregation ministry team in 2001. Under their guidance, a solar panel array was installed on the roof of the sanctuary building in 2009. In that same year, Northwest received an award for its solar panel installation Georgia Interfaith Power and Light organization at its awards banquet.

Two year later, In 2011, Northwest was recognized as an Accredited Green Sanctuary by the Unitarian Universalist Association.

=== North Georgia Social Justice Cluster ===
During the ministry of Rev. Terry Davis, (2012–2017) Northwest was an active member of the North Georgia Social Justice Cluster, continued its participation in the annual Atlanta Pride Parade and engaged in social justice Moral Monday activities launched by Rev. Barber of North Carolina.

== The arts ==
=== Art gallery ===
Northwest has long supported an art gallery where members and local artists have an opportunity to display their paintings, sculptures, photos and other art works. A percentage of the sale of art works supports the congregation's operations.

=== Hungry Ear coffee house ===
The Northwest Coffee House has been cited as one of the longest running coffee houses in the Atlanta area. Started in 1982, the coffee house has been run by volunteers with performers playing only for the shared proceeds from a small admission fee and the collection of a passed basket.

The Hungry Ear over the years has also engaged in its own social justice work. In the early 1980s funds were provided to the Unitarian Universalist Service Committee to benefit that organizations work in prison reform, aging and overseas missions against hunger. In 1989 the Hungry Ear lent support Rev. Dan Aldridge's effort to organize a Unitarian Universalist congregation to serve the needs of Atlanta's black community (Thurman Hamer Ellington UU Church).

For the past several years a donation of canned goods is requested to support a local food bank managed by the Community Assistance Center.

== Ministers ==
Minister	Settlement	From	To
Rev. William DeWolf	Minister-on-Loan	1969	1969
Rev. John Burciaga	Called	1970	1971
Rev. Mack Mitchell	Interim	1973	1973
Rev. Bob Karnan	Called	1974	1983
Rev. Jim Hutchinson	Interim	1984	1984
Rev. Rolfe Gerhardt	Called	1984	1988
Rev. Ted Webb	Interim	1989	1989
Revs. Andy and Andrea Ritan	Called Co-Ministry	1990	1990
Rev. Fred Campbell	Interim	1990	1991
Rev. Roy Reynolds	Called	1992	1999
Rev. Kurt Kuhwald	Interim	1999	2000
Rev. Don Southworth	Called	2001	2006
Rev. Maureen Killoran	Interim	2006	2007
Rev. Jim Macomber	Called	2007	2010
Rev. Morris Hudgins	Interim	2010	2012
Rev. Terry Davis	Called	2012	2017
Rev. Jonathan Rogers	Interim	2018	2019
Rev. Misha Sanders	Called	2019	2024
Rev. Jennifer Dalton	Contract	2025	
