= Federated congregation =

A federated congregation or federated church is two or more congregations that are affiliated with different denominations that acts as one local church congregation. Federated congregations are distinguished from dual affiliated congregations, where the congregation as a whole is affiliated with more than one denomination. Federated congregations are also distinguished from shared churches, which are formed by separate congregations that cooperate, but exist as separate entities affiliated with separate denominational bodies.

== Examples ==
The Federated Community Church of Flagstaff, Arizona, was formed in 1916 by Methodist and Presbyterian congregations that recognized that they both had insufficient resources to survive as separate entities. Originally called "Federated Church", the congregation added "Community" to its name in the 1920s. The church is affiliated with both the United Methodist Church and the Presbyterian Church USA. Through its history, members of other Protestant groups associated with the church temporarily, until they could establish separate local congregations. The United Methodist Church held legal title to the church facilities until the 1960s, when the congregation incorporated as an independent entity.

The Federated Church of Sutton, Nebraska, which is affiliated with both the United Church of Christ and the United Methodist Church, started out as two separate churches founded in the late 19th century. To reduce costs, in 1919 the Congregational and Methodist Episcopal congregations began to worship together and share a minister, shifting between their two church buildings and alternating between Congregational and Methodist Episcopal clergy. They continued to operate as separate congregations until 1949, when they merged and adopted the "federated" name.

In Marlborough, New Hampshire, there was a history of congregations of different denominations sharing facilities long before the Federated Church of Marlborough was formed. After a town meeting house was built in 1790, it was shared by congregations of five denominations (Universalists, Congregationalists, Methodists, Baptists, and Unitarians). Access to use of the building for Sunday worship was apportioned according to the congregations' relative memberships; congregations assembled in members' homes or barns on Sundays when they didn't have use of the meeting house. In subsequent years, the different denominations built their own buildings. In 1927, when the federated congregation was formed by the Congregationalist, Methodist, and Universalist congregations that realized they could no longer sustain themselves separately, the most challenging issue to resolve in uniting the three groups was deciding where the combined congregation should meet. The Federated Church of Marlborough maintains affiliations with the United Church of Christ, United Methodist Church, and Unitarian Universalist Association.

New Spirit Community Church in Berkeley Is affiliated with the Metropolitan Community Church, the United Church of Christ, and the Disciples of Christ.

The Federated Church of Grand Forks, North Dakota, is affiliated with the United Church of Christ and the American Baptist Church. To accommodate the differing practices of the two denominations, the church sanctuary is equipped with two baptismal fonts, one for infant baptisms and the other for immersion of adults. The Federated Church of Livingston, New Jersey, is also a combination of UCC and ABC. The Federated Church of Green Lake, Wisconsin, is a combination of ABC, UCC, and United Methodist.

The Federated Church of West Lafayette, Indiana, is a combination of American Baptist and Disciples of Christ. The Federated Church of Brookston (Indiana) is American Baptist and Presbyterian Church USA. They have been together since 1919.

First Federated Church of North Jackson, Ohio, is a combination of United Church of Christ, Disciples of Christ, and Presbyterian Church (USA). El Dorado County Federated Church, in Placerville, California, is a combination of Presbyterian Church (USA) and United Methodist.

Indian Hill Church, outside of Cincinnati, is a combination of Episcopal and Presbyterian congregations.

Lamb of God Church in Fort Myers, Florida, is Episcopal Church and Evangelical Lutheran Church in America. This combination is also present at St. Christopher's Community in Olympia, Washington and St. John's Episcopal-Lutheran Church in Williams, Arizona.

The Lutheran Church of Arcata, California, is a combination of Evangelical Lutheran Church in America and Lutheran Church–Missouri Synod. Nearby, in McKinleyville, California, Grace Good Shepherd is a combination of Lutheran and Presbyterian. The United Church of the San Juans in Ridgway, Colorado, is a combination of Lutheran (ELCA), United Methodist, Presbyterian, and United Church of Christ. Bethany Lutheran Church in Ames, Iowa, says that it is Evangelical Lutheran Synod and Wisconsin Synod, but it may not be a true federated church.
