= Rufus Phineas Stebbins =

American clergyman (1810–1885)

Rufus Phineas Stebbins (3 March 1810 in South Wilbraham, Massachusetts – 13 August 1885 in Cambridge, Massachusetts) was a Massachusetts and Pennsylvania clergyman.

== Biography ==
After graduating from Amherst College in the class of 1834, he studied theology at the Harvard Divinity School. He was ordained as pastor of a Unitarian church at Leominster, Massachusetts, 20 September 1837, where he remained until 1844. He held a pastorate at Meadville, Pennsylvania from 1844 to 1849, and was president of the theological seminary there from 1844 to 1856. He then held various pastorates, and at the First Unitarian Church of Newton, Massachusetts, from 1877 until his death. Harvard University gave him the degree of D.D.

== Works ==
He was the author of a history of Wilbraham, Massachusetts (Boston, 1864), Study of the Pentateuch (1881), Common-Sense View of the Books of the Old Testament (1885) and numerous addresses.
