= List of Unitarians, Universalists, and Unitarian Universalists =

A number of notable people have considered themselves Unitarians, Universalists, and following the merger of these denominations in the United States and Canada in 1961, Unitarian Universalists. Additionally, there are persons who, because of their writings or reputation, are considered to have held Unitarian or Universalist beliefs. Individuals who held unitarian (nontrinitarian) beliefs but were not affiliated with Unitarian organizations are often referred to as "small 'u'" unitarians. The same principle can be applied to those who believed in universal salvation but were not members of Universalist organizations. This article, therefore, makes the distinction between capitalized "Unitarians" and "Universalists" and lowercase "unitarians" and "universalists".

The Unitarians and Universalists are groups that existed long before the creation of Unitarian Universalism.

Early Unitarians did not hold Universalist beliefs, and early Universalists did not hold Unitarian beliefs. But beginning in the nineteenth century the theologies of the two groups started becoming more similar.

Additionally, their eventual merger as the Unitarian Universalist Association (UUA) did not eliminate divergent Unitarian and Universalist congregations, especially outside the US. Even within the US, some congregations still keep only one of the two names, "Unitarian" or "Universalist". However, with only a few exceptions, all belong to the UUA—even those that maintain dual affiliation (e.g., Unitarian and Quaker). Transcendentalism was a movement that diverged from contemporary American Unitarianism but has been embraced by later Unitarians and Unitarian Universalists.

In Northern Ireland, Unitarian churches are officially called "Non-Subscribing Presbyterian", but are informally known as "Unitarian" and are affiliated with the Unitarian churches of the rest of the world.

== A ==
- Francis Ellingwood Abbot (1836–1903) – Unitarian minister who led a group that attempted to liberalize the Unitarian constitution and preamble. He later helped found the Free Religious Association.
- Abigail Adams (1744–1818) – women's rights advocate and first Second Lady and the second First Lady of the United States
- James Luther Adams (1901–1994) – Unitarian theologian.
- John Adams (1735–1826) – second president of the United States.
- John Quincy Adams (1767–1848) – sixth president of the United States and co-founder of Unitarian All Souls Church, Washington, D.C.
- Sarah Fuller Adams (1805–1848) – English poet and hymn writer
- Conrad Aiken (1889–1973) – poet
- Louisa May Alcott (1832–1888) – author of Little Women.
- Horatio Alger Sr. (1806–1881) – Unitarian Minister father of Horatio Alger.
- Ethan Allen (1738–1789) – author of Reason the Only Oracle of Man, and the chief source of Hosea Ballou's universalist ideas
- Joseph Henry Allen (1820–1898) – American Unitarian scholar and minister
- Arthur J. Altmeyer (1891–1972) – father of Social Security
- Oliver Ames Jr. (1807–1877) – Massachusetts businessman and industrialist who commissioned the building of the Unity Church of North Easton
- J. M. Andrews (1871–1956) – Prime Minister of Northern Ireland (a Non-subscribing Presbyterian member)
- L.F.W. Andrews (1802-1875) - American Southern Universalist minister and a prodigious publisher of denominational and secular newspapers.
- Thomas Andrews (1873–1912) – Master-shipbuilder of the RMS Oceanic (1899), "Big Four", and Olympic-class ocean liners (a Non-subscribing Presbyterian member)
- Tom Andrews (born 1953) – Former U.S. Representative from Maine, current United Nations Special Rapporteur on Human Rights in Myanmar
- Susan B. Anthony (1820–1906) – Quaker
- Robert Aspland (1782–1845) – English Unitarian minister, editor and activist, founder of the British and Foreign Unitarian Association
- Robert Brook Aspland (1805–1869) – English Unitarian minister and editor, son of Robert Aspland

== B ==
- Samuel Bache (1804–1876) – English Unitarian minister
- E. Burdette Backus (1888–1955) – Unitarian Humanist minister (originally a Universalist)
- Blanche Pentecost Bagley (1858–1928) – British-born American Unitarian minister
- Bill Baird (born 1932) – abortion rights pioneer, Unitarian.
- Sara Josephine Baker (1873–1945) – physician and public health worker.
- Emily Greene Balch (1867–1961) – Nobel Peace Laureate
- Roger Nash Baldwin (1884–1981) – founder of American Civil Liberties Union
- Adin Ballou (1803–1890) – abolitionist and former Baptist who became a Universalist minister, then a Unitarian minister.
- Hosea Ballou (1771–1852) – American Universalist leader. (Universalist minister and a unitarian in theology)
- Aaron Bancroft (1755–1839) – Congregationalist Unitarian minister
- John Bardeen (1908–1991) – physicist, Nobel Laureate 1956 (inventing the transistor) and in 1972 (superconductivity)
- Phineas Taylor Barnum (1810–1891) – American showman and Circus Owner
- Ysaye Maria Barnwell (born 1946) – member of Sweet Honey in the Rock, founded the Jubilee Singers, a choir at All Souls Church in Washington, D.C.
- Béla Bartók (1881–1945) – composer.
- Clara Barton (1821–1912) – organizer of American Red Cross, Universalist
- Clara Bancroft Beatley (1858–1923) – educator, lecturer, author
- Christopher C. Bell (born 1933) – author
- Ami Bera (born 1965) – U.S. Representative for California
- Henry Bergh (1811–1888) – founded the American Society for the Prevention of Cruelty to Animals and the Society for the Prevention of Cruelty to Children.
- Tim Berners-Lee (born 1955) – inventor of the World Wide Web.
- Paul Blanshard (1892–1980) – activist.
- Joani Blank (1937–2016) – sexuality educator and co-housing activist.
- Chester Bliss Bowles (1901–1986) – Connecticut Governor and diplomat.
- Ray Bradbury (1920–2012) – author.
- Andre Braugher (1962–2023) – American actor
- T. Berry Brazelton (1918–2018) – pediatrician, author, TV show host.
- Alice Williams Brotherton (1848–1930), poet and magazine writer
- Olympia Brown (1835–1926) – suffragist, Universalist minister of the Unitarian Universalist Church of Kent Ohio
- Percival Brundage (1892–1979) – technocrat
- John A. Buehrens (born 1947) – president of the Unitarian Universalist Association from 1993–2001
- Charles Bulfinch (1763–1844) – most notable for being Architect of the Capitol. Co-founder, All Souls Church, Unitarian (Washington, D.C.)
- Ralph Wendell Burhoe (1911–1997) – scholar
- Harold Hitz Burton (1888–1964) – U.S. Supreme Court Justice 1945–1958
- Edmund Butcher (1757–1822) – English minister

== C ==
- John C. Calhoun (1782–1850) – U.S. Vice President and Senator Co-founder, All Souls Church, Unitarian (Washington, D.C.)
- Walter Bradford Cannon (1871–1945) – experimental physiologist
- Louise Whitfield Carnegie (1857–1946) – wife of philanthropist Andrew Carnegie. After Carnegie died Louise made donations to charities.
- Lant Carpenter (1780–1840) – English Unitarian minister, author and educator
- Russell Lant Carpenter (1816–1892) – Unitarian minister. Son and biographer of Dr. Lant Carpenter
- William Herbert Carruth (1859–1924) – educator, poet, President of Pacific Coast Conference of the Unitarian Church
- Samuel Carter (1805–1878) – British MP and early railway solicitor
- Lee Carter (born 1987) — delegate for Virginia's 50th House of Delegates district (according to his campaign website, he and his family attend their local Unitarian Universalist Church)
- Joseph Chamberlain (1836–1914) – Manufacturer, Unitarian, founder of local government in Britain.
- Neville Chamberlain (1869–1940) – Unitarian, then an agnostic and, British Prime Minister.
- George Leonard Chaney (1836-1922) – Boston Unitarian minister who served the city’s Hollis Street Church for 15 years. Later moved to Atlanta to organize the first Unitarian church in that city.
- Augusta Jane Chapin (1836–1905) – American Universalist minister, educator and activist for women's rights
- William Ellery Channing (1780–1842) – Unitarian minister, whose 1819 sermon "Unitarian Christianity" laid the foundations for American Unitarianism.
- Charles Chauncy (1592–1672) – Unitarian Congregationalist minister.
- Jesse Chickering (1797–1855) – Unitarian minister and economist
- Brock Chisholm (1896–1971) – director, World Health Organization
- Parley P. Christensen (1869–1954) – Utah and California politician, Esperantist
- Judy Chu (born 1953) – Congressperson representing California's 27th Congressional District. First Chinese-American woman elected to the U.S. Congress
- Annie Clark (born 1982) – musician and singer-songwriter, better known by her stage name, St. Vincent (musician).
- Andrew Inglis Clark (1848–1907) – Tasmanian politician. Responsible for the adoption of the Hare-Clark system of proportional representation by the Parliament of Tasmania
- Grenville Clark (1882–1931) – author
- Joseph S. Clark (1901–1990) – U.S. Senator and mayor of Philadelphia
- Laurel Clark (1961–2003) – U.S. Navy officer and NASA Astronaut who died in the Space Shuttle Columbia disaster
- James Freeman Clarke (1810–1888) – Unitarian minister, theologian and author
- Daniel Bragg Clayton (1817-1906) - Known as D.B. Clayton was an American Southern Universalist minister who was instrumental in spreading and defending Universalism in the South.
- Stanley Cobb (1887–1968) – neurologist and psychiatrist
- William Cohen (born 1940) – U.S. Secretary of Defense (1997–2001), U.S. Senator from Maine (1979–1997)
- Emily Parmely Collins (1814–1909) — American suffragist, activist, writer
- Robert Collyer (1823-1912) -- Unitarian clergyman of Chicago and New York, notable for his earnest, direct sermons and vocal support of abolition and women's suffrage.
- Henry Steele Commager (1902–1998) – American historian and biographer of Theodore Parker
- Kent Conrad (born 1948) – U.S. Senator from North Dakota (1992–2013)
- Maria Cook (1779–1835) – first woman to be recognized as a Universalist preacher.
- Mary Leggett Cooke (1852–1938) – Unitarian minister; member of the Iowa Sisterhood
- William David Coolidge (1873–1975) – inventor, physician, research director
- Peter Cooper (1791–1883) – industrialist, inventor, philanthropist, and politician; founder of The Cooper Union.
- Norman Cousins (1915–1990) – editor and writer, Unitarian friend
- E. E. Cummings (1894–1962) – poet and painter
- William Cushing (1732–1810) – one of the original US Supreme Court Justices, appointed by Geo. Washington and longest serving of the original justices (1789–1810).

== D ==
- Cyrus Dallin (1861–1944) – American sculptor
- Charles Darwin (1809–1882) – English naturalist and biologist
- Ferenc Dávid (born as Franz David Hertel, often rendered as Francis David or Francis Davidis) (1510–1579) – Transylvanian priest, minister and bishop, founder of the Unitarian Church of Transylvania, first to use the word "Unitarian" to describe his faith
- A. Powell Davies (1902–1957) Unitarian minister, author
- George de Benneville (1703–1793) – Universalist
- Morris Dees (born 1936) – attorney, cofounder, chief legal counsel of Southern Poverty Law Center
- Karl W. Deutsch (1912–1992) – international political scientist
- John Dewey (1859–1952) – author of A Common Faith, Unitarian friend
- Robert Dexter (1887-1955) - founder of Unitarian Service Committee, worked in Europe during World War II
- Charles Dickens (1812–1870) – English novelist.
- Dorothea Dix (1802–1887) – prison reformer in New England.
- John H. Dietrich (1878–1957) – Unitarian minister
- James Drummond Dole (1877–1958) – entrepreneur
- Emily Taft Douglas (1899–1994) – U.S. Representative, Illinois
- Paul Douglas (1892–1976) – U.S. Senator, also a Quaker
- Madelyn Dunham (1922–2008) – grandmother of U.S. President Barack Obama
- Stanley Armour Dunham (1918–1992) – grandfather of Barack Obama
- Stanley Ann Dunham (1942–1995) – mother of Barack Obama

== E ==
- Richard Eddy (1828–1906) – minister and author of 1886 book Universalism in America.
- James Chuter Ede (1882–1965) – British teacher, trade unionist and politician, Home Secretary (1945–1951) and President of the General Assembly of Unitarian and Free Christian Churches
- Charles William Eliot (1834–1926) – landscape architect
- Samuel Atkins Eliot (1862–1950) – first president of the Unitarians
- Thomas H. Eliot (1907–1991) – legislator and educator
- Thomas Lamb Eliot (1841–1936) – minister, founder of First Unitarian Church in Portland, Oregon, and Reed College
- Mary Elvira Elliott (1851–1942) – American writer and lecturer
- Ralph Waldo Emerson (1803–1882) – Unitarian minister and Transcendentalist
- William Emerson (1873–1957) – MIT dean of architecture
- Ephraim Emerton (1851–1935) – historian and educator
- Charles Carroll Everett (1829–1900) – Unitarian minister and Harvard Divinity professor from Maine
- Charles Wesley Emerson (1837–1908) – Unitarian minister and founder of Emerson College

== F ==
- Sophia Lyon Fahs (1876–1978) – liberal religious educator
- Millard Fillmore (1800–1874) – thirteenth president of the United States
- Joseph L. Fisher (1914–1992) – U.S. congressman
- Hermann van Flekwyk (d. 1569) – Dutch anabaptist
- Benjamin Flower (1755–1829) – English radical writer
- James Freeman (1759–1835) – first American preacher to call himself a Unitarian
- Caleb Fleming (1698–1779) – English anti-Trinitarian dissenting minister
- Robert Fulghum (born 1937) – UU minister and writer
- Allen Fuller (1798-1864) - Northern minister who assisted in the spread of Universalism in the American South.
- Buckminster Fuller (1895–1983) – inventor, engineer
- Margaret Fuller (1810–1850) – journalist
- János Füzi (1776–1833) – Unitarian minister, teacher

== G ==
- Elizabeth Gaskell (1810–1865) – British novelist and social reformer
- William Gaskell (1805–1844) – Unitarian minister and teacher
- Frank Gannett (1876–1957) – newspaper publisher
- Greta Gerwig (born 1983) – actor, screenwriter and director
- Thomas Field Gibson (1803–1889) – English manufacturer who aided the welfare of the Spitalfields silk weavers
- Henry Giles (1809–1882) – British-American Unitarian minister and writer
- Hilary Goodridge – the lead plaintiff in the landmark case Goodridge v. Department of Public Health
- Eleanor Gordon (1852–1942) – minister and member of the Iowa Sisterhood.
- Mike Gravel (1930–2021) – U.S. Senator; 2008 Democratic presidential candidate
- Mary H. Graves (1839–1908) – minister, literary editor, writer
- Dana Greeley (1908–1986) – the first president of the Unitarian Universalist Association
- Horace Greeley (1811–1872) – newspaper editor, presidential candidate, Universalist
- Robert Joseph Greene (born 1973) – Canadian author and LGBT Activist
- Chester Greenwood (1858–1937) – inventor
- Gary Gygax (1938–2008) – game designer and creator of Dungeons & Dragons, called himself a Christian, "albeit one that is of the Arian (Unitarian) persuasion."

== H ==
- Edward Everett Hale (1822–1909) – American author, historian and Unitarian clergyman
- George Ernest Hale (1884–1966), Unitarian minister in South Australia
- Ellen L. Hamilton (1921–1996) – artist, author, advocate for homeless teens, and member of UUA Board of Trustees (1973–1977).
- Phebe Ann Coffin Hannaford (1829–1921) – first lesbian minister, biographer
- Frances Harper (1825–1911) – abolitionist, suffragist, poet, teacher, public speaker, and writer; one of the first African-American women to be published in the United States. Unitarian.
- Donald S. Harrington (1914–2005)
- Charles Hartshorne (1897–2000) – theologian, who developed Process Theology
- John Hayward – philosopher of religion and the arts
- William Hazlitt (1737–1820) – influential Unitarian minister and father of the writer of the same name
- Oliver Heaviside (1850–1925) – self-taught English electrical engineer, mathematician, and physicist
- Aubrey Franklin Hess (1874-1935) – progressive American theologian and educator.
- Iacob Heraclid (1527–1563) – Greek Maltese adventurer, missionary, Prince of Moldavia
- Thomas Wentworth Higginson (1823–1911) – Unitarian Minister and member of the Secret Six who funded John Brown's raid on Harper's Ferry.
- Lotta Hitschmanova (1909–1990) – founder, Unitarian Service Committee of Canada
- Jessica Holmes (born 1973) – cast member of Air Farce.
- John Holmes (1904–1962) – poet
- Oliver Wendell Holmes Jr. (1841–1935) – American jurist who served as an Associate Justice of the Supreme Court of the United States from 1902 to 1932. Unitarian
- W. R. Holway (1893–1981) – engineer in Tulsa, co-founded All Souls Unitarian Church in 1921.
- Julia Ward Howe (1819–1910) – author of "The Battle Hymn of the Republic".
- Roman Hruska (1904–1999) – conservative Republican Senator from Nebraska
- David Hubel (1926–2013) – Nobel Prize Laureate in Medicine 1981
- Charles Hudson (1795–1881) – Universalist minister and politician
- Harm Jan Huidekoper (1776–1854) – businessman, essayist and lay theologian, a vice president of the American Unitarian Association, and co-founder of the Meadville Theological School
- Michelle Huneven (born August 14, 1953) – American novelist and journalist. She attends Neighborhood Unitarian Universalist Church in Pasadena, California.

== J ==
- Thomas Jefferson (1743–1826) – third president of the U.S., unitarian but not affiliated with any sect
- Joseph Johnson (1738–1809) – English publisher
- Jenkin Lloyd Jones (1843–1918) – Unitarian missionary and minister in the United States
- Richard Lloyd Jones (1873–1963) – son of Jenkin Lloyd Jones, editor and publisher of the Tulsa Tribune, also co-founder of All Souls Unitarian Church in 1921.
- Annie Bizzell Jordan Willis (1893–1977) – daughter of Rev. Joseph Fletcher Jordan, a religious educator and integrationist
- Charles R. Joy (1885-1978) - Unitarian minister, author, and humanitarian aid worker during World War II.

== I ==
- Athalia L. J. Irwin (1862-1915) - Southern Universalist minister, editor of The Universalist Herald

== K ==
- György Kepes (1906–2001) – visual artist
- Naomi King (born 1970) – Unitarian minister, daughter of author Stephen King
- Thomas Starr King (1824–1864) – minister who during his career served both in Universalist and in Unitarian churches. Namesake of Starr King School.
- James R. Killian (1904–1988) – president of the Massachusetts Institute of Technology
- W.M. Kiplinger (1891–1967) – publisher of the Kiplinger Letters
- Webster Kitchell (1931–2009) – theologian
- Abner Kneeland (1774–1844) – Universalist minister and denominational leader who, after leaving the denomination to become a leader in the freethought movement, was convicted and jailed for blasphemy.
- Richard Knight (1768–1844) – friend, colleague and follower of Joseph Priestley, developed the first method to make platinum malleable. Stored Priestley's library during his escape to America.
- Penney Kome (born 1948) – Canadian author and journalist

== L ==
- William L. Langer (1896–1977) – historian of diplomacy
- Margaret Laurence (1926–1987) – author
- Alfred McClung Lee (1906–1992) – sociologist
- John Lewis (philosopher) (1889–1976) – British Unitarian minister and Marxist philosopher and author of many works on philosophy, anthropology, and religion.
- Arthur Lismer (1885–1969) – Canadian painter, educator
- Theophilus Lindsey (1723–1808) – Unitarian theologian and clergyman
- Viola Liuzzo (1925–1965) – civil rights activist
- Mary Livermore (1820–1905) – Universalist
- James W. Loewen (1942–2021) – sociologist
- Arthur Lovejoy (1873–1962) – founder of the History of Ideas movement

== M ==
- Carrie Mac (born 1975) – Canadian author
- John P. Marquand (1893–1960) – author
- Peter Finch Martineau (1755–1847) – English businessman and community benefactor
- Charlotte Garrigue Masaryk(ová) (1850–1923) – wife of first President of Czechoslovakia Tomáš Garrigue Masaryk
- Tomáš Garrigue Masaryk (1850–1937) – first President of Czechoslovakia
- Bernard Maybeck (1862–1957) – architect, Unitarian
- William Henry McGlauflin (1856-1927) - General Superintendent, Universalist General Convention.
- Scotty McLennan (born 1948) – dean for Religious Life at Stanford University, Minister of Stanford Memorial Church, and inspiration for the Reverend Scot Sloan character in the comic strip Doonesbury
- Adrian Melott (born 1947) – physicist and cosmologist
- Herman Melville (1819–1891) – American writer best known for Moby-Dick.
- Samuel Freeman Miller (1816–1890) – United States Supreme Court Justice from 1862 to 1890
- Robert Millikan (1868–1953) – Nobel Laureate in Physics 1923 for determining the charge of the electron, taught at Caltech in Pasadena CA
- Walt Minnick (born 1942) – Politician and representative for Idaho's 1st congressional district, United States House of Representatives
- Théodore Monod (1902–2000) – French activist. Founding president of the Francophone Unitarian Association
- Ashley Montagu (1905–1999) – anthropologist and social biologist
- Slim Moon (born 1967) – American music producer
- Christopher Moore – founder of the Chicago Children's Choir
- Mary Carr Moore (1873–1957) – composer, teacher, Far Western activist for American Music
- Peter Morales – eighth president of the Unitarian Universalist Association
- Arthur E. Morgan (1878–1975) – human engineer and college president
- John Murray (1741–1815) – Universalist minister and leader
- Judith Sargent Murray (1751–1820) – American writer, held a local Universalist preacher's license in the 1790s, an advocate of Universalism and women's rights

== N ==
- Isaac Newton (1642–1726) – English physicist and mathematician
- Maurine Neuberger (1907–2000) – U.S. Senator
- Paul Newman (1925–2008) – actor, film director
- Andrews Norton (1786–1853) – Once known as the “Unitarian Pope”
- Joseph Nye (1937-2025) Rhodes Scholar and former dean of the John F. Kennedy School of Government at Harvard University.

== O ==
- Keith Olbermann (born 1959) – news anchor, political commentator, and sports journalist
- Mary White Ovington (1865–1951) – NAACP founder

== P ==
- Bob Packwood (1932–2026) – U.S. Senator from Oregon (1969–1995)
- John Palmer (1742–1786) – English Unitarian minister
- David Park (1911–1960) – West coast painter.
- Isaac Parker (1768–1830) – Massachusetts Congressman and jurist, including Chief Justice of the Massachusetts Supreme Judicial Court from 1814 to his death.
- Theodore Parker (1810–1860) – Unitarian minister and transcendentalist
- Linus Pauling (1901–1994) – Nobel Laureate for Peace and for Chemistry
- Randy Pausch (1960–2008) – computer science professor at Carnegie Mellon University, Author of The Last Lecture
- Cecilia Payne-Gaposchkin (1900–1979) – astronomer and astrophysicist.
- Richard Peacock (1820–1889) – British locomotive engineer and philanthropist
- Laura Pedersen (born 1965) – American author, journalist, playwright and humorist. Books and plays with humanist themes. Lifelong UU, Interfaith minister.
- Sarah Maria Clinton Perkins (1824–1905) – American Universalist minister, social reformer, lecturer, editor, author
- Melissa Harris-Perry (born 1973) – professor, author, and political commentator on MSNBC hosting the Melissa Harris-Perry TV program.
- William James Perry, (born 1927) – former United States Secretary of Defense
- William T. Pheiffer (1898–1986) – American lawyer/politician
- Utah Phillips (1935–2008) – American singer, songwriter and homeless advocate
- William Pickering (1910–2004) – space explorer
- James Pierpont (1822–1893) – songwriter ("Jingle Bells")
- Daniel Pinkham (1923–2006) – composer
- Norman Pinney (1804–1862) – teacher, minister and author
- John Platts (1775–1837) – English Unitarian minister and author
- Van Rensselaer Potter (1911–2001) – global bioethicist
- Joseph Priestley (1733–1804) – discoverer of oxygen and Unitarian minister
- George Pullman (1831–1897) – Universalist
- Sylvia Plath (1932–1963) – American writer, poet
- Beatrix Potter (1866–1943) – British children's writer of the famous "Peter Rabbit" stories

== R ==
- Bonnie Raitt (born 1949) – singer and guitarist
- Mary Jane Rathbun (1860–1943) – marine zoologist
- James Reeb (1927–1965) – civil-rights martyr
- Curtis W. Reese (1887–1961) – religious humanist
- Christopher Reeve (1952–2004) – actor and Unitarian Universalist
- James Relly (c. 1722–1778) – Universalist
- Paul Revere (1735–1818) – American silversmith, industrialist and patriot
- David Ricardo (1772–1823) – British classical economist noted for creating the concept of comparative advantage
- Malvina Reynolds (1900–1978) – songwriter / singer / activist
- Mark Ritchie (born 1951) – Minnesota Secretary of State (2007–)
- Amber E. Robinson (1867–1961), educator, postmaster, poet, reporter, and social reformer
- Alfred Ronalds (1802–1860) – British author of The Fly-fisher's Entomology and Australian pioneer
- Emily Ronalds (1795–1889) – British social reformer and educationalist
- Hugh Ronalds (1760–1833) – British horticulturalist and nurseryman
- Francis Ronalds (1788–1873) – English inventor of the electric telegraph
- Benjamin Rush (1745–1813) – very active in the Universalist movement, although never technically joined a Universalist congregation

== S ==
- Mary Augusta Safford (1851–1927) – Unitarian Minister and leader of the Iowa Sisterhood.
- Leverett Saltonstall (1892–1979) – U.S. Senator from Massachusetts
- Franklin Benjamin Sanborn (1831–1917) – one of the Secret Six who funded John Brown's raid on Harper's Ferry; social scientist and memorialist of transcendentalism.
- May Sarton (1912–1995) – poet
- Ellery Schempp (born 1940) – physicist who was the primary student involved in the landmark 1963 United States Supreme Court case of Abington School District v. Schempp, which declared that public school-sanctioned Bible readings were unconstitutional.
- Arthur Schlesinger (1917–2007) – American historian
- Richard Schultes (1915–2001) – explorer of the Amazon jungle
- William F. Schulz (born 1949) – former executive director of Amnesty International USA, former president of the Unitarian Universalist Association
- Ferdinand Schumacher (1822–1908) – one of the founders of companies which merged to become the Quaker Oats Company.
- Albert Schweitzer (1875–1965) – Nobel Peace Laureate 1953, late in life unitarian; honorary member of the Church of the Larger Fellowship (Unitarian Friend)
- Pete Seeger (1919–2014) – folk singer and song writer
- Roy Wood Sellars (1880–1973) – philosopher of religious humanism
- Rod Serling (1924–1975) – writer; creator of The Twilight Zone television series.
- Martha Sharp (1905–1999) – American Unitarian who was named by the Yad Vashem organization as "Righteous Among the Nations."
- Waitstill Sharp (1902–1983) – Unitarian minister who along with his wife Martha were named by Yad Vashem as "Righteous Among the Nations."
- Lemuel Shaw (1781–1861) – Unitarian and chief justice of the Massachusetts Supreme Judicial Court. Under his leadership, the court convicted Abner Kneeland, a former Universalist, of blasphemy.
- Robert Gould Shaw (1837–1863) – colonel of the 54th Massachusetts, first regiment of free blacks in the Union Army.
- Herbert A. Simon (1916–2001) – Nobel Laureate in Economics 1978, artificial intelligence pioneer
- Rev. William G. Sinkford (born 1946) – seventh president of the Unitarian Universalist Association
- Fred Small (born 1952) – Singer-songwriter and UU minister.
- Caroline Soule (1824–1903) – American writer, ordained Universalist minister, first woman ordained as a minister in the UK in 1880
- Vanessa Southern, minister of the Unitarian Church in Summit
- Catherine Helen Spence (1825–1910) – Australian suffragist and political reformer
- Lysander Spooner (1808–1887) – American abolitionist and anarchist.
- Elizabeth Cady Stanton (1815–1902) – American suffragist, abolitionist, and leading figure of the early women's rights movement
- Pete Stark (1931–2020) – U.S. Representative, D-California.
- Vilhjalmur Stefansson (1879–1962) – Arctic explorer and champion of Native American rights
- Charles Proteus Steinmetz (1865–1923) – Prussian-American electrical engineer and mathematician
- Adlai Stevenson (1900–1965) – Illinois governor, and Democratic presidential candidate in 1952 and 1956
- George D. Stoddard (1897–1981) – president of University of Illinois and the University of the State of New York.
- Lucy Stone (1818—1893) American orator, abolitionist, and suffragist
- Joseph Story (1779–1845) – United States Supreme Court Justice from 1811 to 1845.
- Dirk Jan Struik (1894–2000) – mathematician
- Jedediah Strutt (1726–1797) – pioneer cotton spinner and philanthropic employer.
- Margaret Sutton (1903–2001) – author of the Judy Bolton series and other children's books
- Frances C. Swift (1834-1908) – native-born Southerner and influential female lay leader in the early days of the spread of Unitarianism in the South. President of the Atlanta Equal Suffrage Association.
- Jude Sylvan (b. 1982) – American poet, author, performer, producer, and performing artist and UU minister.

== T ==
- William Howard Taft (1857–1930) – president of the United States (1909–1913) and chief justice of the United States
- Robin Tanner – American Unitarian Universalist Minister and advocate for LGBT rights and voting rights.
- Clementia Taylor (1810–1908) – women's activist and radical
- Joyce Tischler – Founder of Animal Legal Defense Fund, referred to as the "Mother of Animal Law."
- Clyde Tombaugh (1906–1997) – American astronomer who discovered Pluto
- Amos G. Throop (1811–1894) – Founder of Throop University, which later became the California Institute of Technology in Pasadena, where he was also the city's third mayor. Throop Unitarian Universalist Church in Pasadena, a Unitarian Universalist congregation founded in 1923, was named after him.

== V ==
- William Vidler (1758–1816) – English Universalist and Unitarian minister
- Kurt Vonnegut (1922–2007) – writer

== W ==
- George Wald (1906–1997) – Nobel Laureate in Medicine 1967
- Zach Wahls (born 1991) – LGBT activist, Iowa State Senator
- Caroline Farrar Ware (1899–1990) – historian and social activist
- William D. Washburn (1831–1912) – Universalist American politician and businessman
- Daniel Webster (1782–1852) – lawyer and statesman
- Dawud Wharnsby (born 1972) – poet, singer and songwriter (Unitarian Universalist and Muslim)
- Alfred Tredway White (1846–1921) – housing reformer and philanthropist
- Alfred North Whitehead (1861–1947) – philosopher (Unitarian Friend)
- Willis Rodney Whitney (1868–1958) – the "Father of Basic Research in Industry"
- Thomas Whittemore (1800–1861) – Universalist Minister, author and publisher
- David Rhys Williams (1890–1970) – American Unitarian minister
- Edward Williams (bardic name Iolo Morganwg) (1747–1826) – Welsh antiquarian, poet, collector, forger
- William Carlos Williams (1883–1963) – physician and author
- Samuel Williston (1861–1963) – dean of America's legal profession.
- Edwin H. Wilson (1898–1993) – Unitarian Humanist leader
- Ross Winans (1796–1877) – inventor and railroad pioneer
- John Crawford Woods (1824–1906), Unitarian minister of Adelaide, South Australia
- Joanne Woodward (born 1930) – actress, wife of Paul Newman
- Theodore Paul Wright (1895–1970) – aeronautical engineer
- Frank Lloyd Wright (1867–1959) – among Wright's architectural works were Unity Temple in Oak Park, Illinois, and First Unitarian Society in Madison, Wisconsin.
- Quincy Wright (1890–1970) – author of A Study of War
- Richard Wright (1764–1836) – English Unitarian minister and missionary
- Sewall Wright (1889–1988) – evolutionary theorist.
- N. C. Wyeth (1882–1945) – illustrator and painter

== Y ==
- Owen D. Young (1874–1962) – president and chairman of General Electric. Founder of Radio Corporation of America which helped found National Broadcasting Company. Drafted the Young Plan after World War I.
- Whitney M. Young (1921–1971) – social work administrator

== Z ==
- John II Sigismund Zápolya (1540–1570) – king of Hungary, then prince of Transylvania.

== See also ==
- List of Christian universalists
- List of Unitarian, Universalist, and Unitarian Universalist churches
- Lists of people by belief
