= Kneeland =

Kneeland may refer to:

== Places ==
United States

- Kneeland, California
- Kneeland, Michigan
- Kneeland, Wisconsin
- Kneeland Airport
- Kneeland Elementary School District

== Court case ==
- Commonwealth v. Kneeland, court case

== People ==
- Abner Kneeland (1774–1844), American evangelist and theologian
- David Kneeland (1881–1948), American athlete
- Francis M. Kneeland (1873–?), African American physician
- Hildegarde Kneeland (1889–1994), American economist and statistician
- Marshawn Kneeland (2001–2025), American football player
- Kneeland Hibbett, American football player
- Kneeland Youngblood (born 1955), American surgeon and political figure
