= Mockus =

- Lithuanian surname
- m.: Mockus
- f.: (unmarried): Mockutė
- f.: (married): Mockienė, Mockuvienė

Mockus is a surname of Lithuanian origin. It is a diminutive from the given name Mãtas, Motiẽjus, Matthew. The surname may refer to:

- Antanas Mockus (b. 1952), Lithuanian-Colombian mathematician, philosopher, and politician
- Darius Juozas Mockus (b. 1965), Lithuanian businessman
- Izidorius Mockus (1920–1950) Lithuanian resistance fighter
- Michael X. Mockus (1873–1945), Lithuanian-American minister embroiled in prosecutions for blasphemy
- Rimantas Mockus, Lithuanian politician
