= David Eaton =

David Eaton may refer to:

- David Eaton (composer) (born 1949), American composer
- David Eaton (cricketer) (1934–2012), South African cricketer
- David Eaton (footballer) (born 1981), English footballer
- David Eaton (gymnast) (born 1980), Welsh gymnast
- David Hilliard Eaton (1932–1992), American Unitarian minister
