= List of Christian universalists =

This is a list of writers who advocated Christian universalism—specifically, Trinitarian universalism–prior to the 1961 creation of the Unitarian Universalist Association.

Scholars Hosea Ballou (Ancient History of Universalism, 1828), John Wesley Hanson (Universalism: The Prevailing Doctrine of the Christian Church During Its First Five Hundred Years, 1899), George T. Knight (The New Schaff-Herzog Encyclopedia of Religious Knowledge, 1911), and Pierre Batiffol (Catholic Encyclopedia, 1914) catalogued some early Christians—from the second through fourth centuries—as universalists, but modern scholarship questions the claim that all of these individuals were believers in universal reconciliation.^{[a]} Some listed by those writers may have simply believed in apokatastasis in the Jewish or early Christian sense, without any expectation that all who had ever lived would be saved.

Several modern Christian theologians have been deemed "hopeful universalists" for a belief in the possibility of universal reconciliation, but did not claim it as a dogmatic fact, e.g. Karl Barth, Cormac Murphy-O'Connor and Pope Francis.

== Table ==
Name	Lived	Nationality	Denomination	Notes
Clement of Alexandria	150-215	Coptic / Greek	early church	Priest, instructor at the School of Alexandria.
Theophilus of Antioch	169-183	Syrian	early church	Bishop, Patriarch of Antioch
Origen	185-254	Coptic / Greek	early church	Theologian, disciple of Clement.
Pamphilus of Caesarea	309	Syrian	early church	Priest, Teacher of Eusebius
Methodius of Olympus	311	Greek	early church	Bishop, Church Father, Martyr, Theologian
Gregory of Nyssa	335-394	Greek	early church	Bishop, Cappadocian Father.
Diodorus of Tarsus	390	Syrian	Church of the East	Bishop, Theologian
Didymus the Blind	310-398	Coptic / Greek	early church	Theologian, disciple of Origen.
Theodore of Mopsuestia	352-428	Greek	Church of the East	Bishop, hermeneuticist.
Isaac the Syrian	613-700	Syrian	Church of the East	Bishop, theologian.
John Scotus Eriugena	800s	Irish	early church	Theologian, Neoplatonist, poet.
Solomon of Akhlat	1222	Syrian	Church of the East	Bishop of Basra, Theologian
William Langland	1330-1386	English	Catholic Church	Vernacular Writer of Piers Plowman
Richard Coppin	1500s or 1600s–1660s	English	Anglican, later Presbyterian Ranter	Anglican clergyman.
William Law	1686–April 9, 1761	English	Anglican	Cleric.
Jane Leade	1624–1704	English	Behemenist, later Philadelphian	Mystic, founder of the Philadelphians.
Alexander Mack	July 27, 1679–January 18, 1735	German	Reformed, later Brethren/German Baptist	Founder and first minister of the Brethren/German Baptists.
Giovanni Pico della Mirandola	February 24, 1463–November 17, 1494	Italian	Roman Catholic	Kabbalist and philosopher.
John Pordage	1607–1681	English	Anglican, later Philadelphian	Priest and mystic.
Andrew Michael Ramsay	January 9, 1686–May 6, 1743	Scottish	Catholic Church	Theologian and writer
Thomas Potter	1689–1777	American	Baptist, later Universalist Church of America	Universalist minister.
Gerrard Winstanley	1609–September 10, 1676	English	Digger and Quaker	
George MacDonald	December 10, 1824–September 19, 1905	Scottish	Congregational	Clergyman and writer of novels.
Maria Cook	1779–December 21, 1835	American	Universalist	First woman to be recognized as a Universalist preacher.
Sergei Bulgakov	July 28, 1871–July 12, 1944	Russian	Russian Orthodox	Orthodox priest and former socialist politician.
John Milbank	October 23, 1952–present	English	Anglican	Theology professor, founder of radical orthodoxy
David Bentley Hart	February 20, 1965–present	American	Episcopalian, later Greek Orthodox	Writer and Orthodox philosopher.
Ilaria Ramelli	1973-Present	Italian	Catholic Church	Writer, Theologian, and Professor
Jordan Daniel Wood	1986-Present	American	Catholic Church	Professor,Writer, Theologian

== Notes ==
- For example, Frederick W. Norris in the article on apocatastasis in 2004's The Westminster Handbook to Origen writes that "As far as we can tell, therefore, Origen never decided to stress exclusive salvation or universal salvation, to the strict exclusion of either case."

== See also ==
- Apocatastasis
- Christian Universalism
- Universal reconciliation
- Universalist Church of America
- List of Unitarians, Universalists, and Unitarian Universalists
