= Blasphemy law in the United States =

While there are no federal laws which forbid "religious insult" or "hate speech", some states continue to have blasphemy statutes.

== Blasphemy laws ==
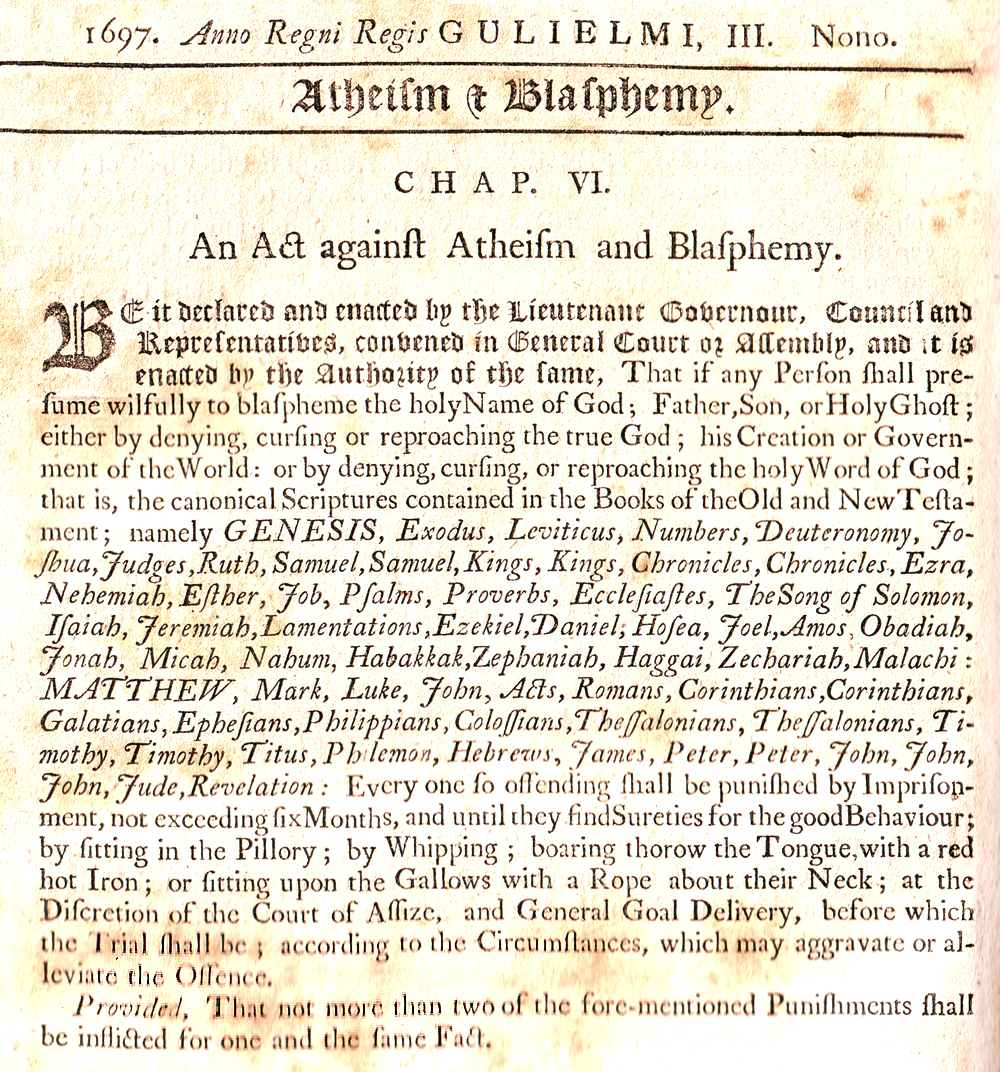
"An Act against Atheism and Blasphemy" as enacted in 1697 in "His Majesty's Province of the Massachusetts-Bay in New-England" (1759 printing)

In 2009, The New York Times reported that Massachusetts, Michigan, Oklahoma, South Carolina, Wyoming, and Pennsylvania had laws that made reference to blasphemy. Pennsylvania's blasphemy law was found unconstitutional in 2010. Some U.S. states still have blasphemy laws on the books from the founding days.

The remaining 6 laws referencing blasphemy are as follows:

- Massachusetts (Massachusetts Revised Statutes, Ch. 272 § 36)
- Michigan (Michigan Compiled Laws, §§ 750.102-750.103)
- Oklahoma (Oklahoma Statutes, tit. 21 §§ 901-905)
- South Carolina (South Carolina Code of Laws, § 16-17-520)
- Wyoming (Wyoming Statutes, § 1-29-106)

=== Active laws ===
==== Massachusetts ====
For example, Chapter 272, Section 36 of the Massachusetts General Laws – a provision based on a similar colonial-era Massachusetts Bay statute enacted in 1697 – states:

Whoever willfully blasphemes the holy name of God by denying, cursing or contumeliously reproaching God, His creation, government or final judging of the world, or by cursing or contumeliously reproaching Jesus Christ or the Holy Ghost, or by cursing or contumeliously reproaching or exposing to contempt and ridicule, the holy word of God contained in the holy scriptures shall be punished by imprisonment in jail for not more than one year or by a fine of not more than three hundred dollars, and may also be bound to good behavior.

==== Michigan ====
Michigan's law reads as follows:

Punishment—Any person who shall wilfully blaspheme the holy name of God, by cursing or contumeliously reproaching God, shall be guilty of a misdemeanor.

History: 1931, Act 328, Eff. Sept. 18, 1931; CL 1948, 750.102 Former Law: See section 17 of Ch. 158 of R.S. 1846, being CL 1857, §5872; CL 1871, §7707; How., §9293; CL 1897, §11706; CL 1915, §15480; and CL 1929, § 16832.

Secondarily, there is an "anti-profanity" law, which includes "blasphemy" elements, and reads as follows.

Cursing and swearing—Any person who has arrived at the age of discretion, who shall profanely curse or damn or swear by the name of God, Jesus Christ or the Holy Ghost, shall be guilty of a misdemeanor. No such prosecution shall be sustained unless it shall be commenced within 5 days after the commission of such offense.

History: 1931, Act 328, Eff. Sept. 18, 1931; CL 1948, 750.103 Former Law: See section 18 of Ch. 158 of R.S. 1846, being CL 1857, §5873; CL 1871, §7708; How., §9294; CL 1897, §11707; CL 1915, §15481; and CL 1929, § 16833.

==== Oklahoma ====
Oklahoma's law reads as follows:

Blasphemy consists in wantonly uttering or publishing words, casting contumelious reproach or profane ridicule upon God, Jesus Christ, the Holy Ghost, the Holy Scriptures or the Christian or any other religion.

The subsequent 2 sections exempt serious discussion from it and define it as a misdemeanor.

The next section bans blasphemous swearing:

Profane swearing consists in any use of the name of God, or Jesus Christ, or the Holy Ghost, either in imprecating divine vengeance upon the utterer, or any other person, or in light, trifling or irreverent speech.

Acc. to the subsequent section, it's punished with a $1 fine for each instance.

==== South Carolina ====
South Carolina's law doesn't punish blasphemous speech except when it's intended to disturb or interrupt public or private religious gatherings:

Any person who shall (a) wilfully and maliciously disturb or interrupt any meeting, society, assembly or congregation convened for the purpose of religious worship, (b) enter such meeting while in a state of intoxication or (c) use or sell spirituous liquors, or use blasphemous, profane or obscene language at or near the place of meeting shall be guilty of a misdemeanor and shall, on conviction, be sentenced to pay a fine of not less than twenty nor more than one hundred dollars, or be imprisoned for a term not exceeding one year or less than thirty days, either or both, at the discretion of the court.

==== Wyoming ====
Wyoming's law prohibits publication of blasphemous speech/material (online media, print media, literature, TV and radio public broadcasting, etc.):

Nothing in W.S. 1-29-104 or 1-29-105 shall authorize the publication of blasphemous or indecent matter.

=== Defunct laws ===
==== Maine ====
Maine's law read as follows:

Blasphemy may be committed either by using profanely insolent and reproachful language against God, or by contumeliously reproaching Him, His creation, government, final judgment of the world, Jesus Christ, the Holy Ghost, or the Holy Scriptures as contained in the canonical books of the Old and New Testament, or by exposing any of these enumerated Beings or Scriptures to contempt and ridicule, and it is not necessary for the state to prove the doing of all of them.

— Maine Tit. 17, sec. 451.

It was repealed by Public Law 1975 during the Maine Criminal Code Revision.

==== Maryland ====
The history of Maryland's blasphemy statutes suggests that even into the 1930s, the First Amendment was not recognized as preventing states from passing such laws. An 1879 codification of Maryland statutes prohibited blasphemy:

If any person, by writing or speaking, shall blaspheme or curse God, or shall write or utter any profane words of and concerning our Saviour, Jesus Christ, or of and concerning the Trinity, or any of the persons thereof, he shall, on conviction, be fined not more than one hundred dollars, or imprisoned not more than six months, or both fined and imprisoned as aforesaid, at the discretion of the court.

— Art. 72, sec. 189

According to the marginalia, this statute was adopted in 1819, and a similar law dates back to 1723. In 1904, the statute was still on the books, unaltered in text. As late as 1939, this statute was still on the books. But in 1972, in Maryland v. Irving K. West, the Maryland Court of Appeals (the state's highest court) declared the blasphemy law unconstitutional. This law was repealed by the acts of 2002 effective as of October 1, 2002.

==== Pennsylvania ====
Pennsylvania's law banned blasphemous naming of businesses:

An association name may not contain words that constitute blasphemy, profane cursing or swearing or that profane the Lord’s name.

In 2010, it was found unconstitutional by the United States District Court for the Eastern District of Pennsylvania after a lawsuit by the American Civil Liberties Union of Pennsylvania.

== Prosecutions for blasphemy ==
=== Massachusetts ===
The last person to be jailed in the United States for blasphemy was Abner Kneeland in 1838 (a Massachusetts case: Commonwealth v. Kneeland). From 1925, the Supreme Court applied the Bill of Rights to all states.

In February 1926, Lithuanian-American Communist Anthony Bimba was charged in Brockton, Massachusetts with blasphemy under a law passed during the time of the Salem Witch Trials more than two centuries earlier, as well as sedition. A widely publicized week-long trial followed, during which Bimba's attorney likened atheism to religious belief and maintained that individuals had a right under the United States constitution to believe or disbelieve in the existence of a God. Bimba was ultimately found not guilty of blasphemy but convicted of sedition, for which he was fined $100.

=== Maine ===
In 1921, Lithuanian-American Michael X. Mockus was convicted in Maine. He appealed to the Supreme Judicial Court of Maine on March 25, 1921, in State v. Mockus and lost the appeal.

=== Arkansas ===
The last known U.S. conviction for blasphemy was of atheist activist Charles Lee Smith. In 1928, he rented a storefront in Little Rock, Arkansas, and gave out free atheist literature there. The sign in the window read: "Evolution Is True. The Bible's a Lie. God's a Ghost." For this he was charged with violating the city ordinance against blasphemy. Because he was an atheist and therefore could not swear the court's religious oath to tell the truth, he was not permitted to testify in his own defense. The judge then dismissed the original charge, replacing it with one of distributing obscene, slanderous, or scurrilous literature. Smith was convicted, fined $25, and served most of a twenty-six-day jail sentence. His high-profile fast while behind bars drew national media attention. Upon his release, he immediately resumed his atheist activities, was again charged with blasphemy, and this time the charge held. In his trial he was again denied the right to testify and was sentenced to ninety days in jail and a fine of $100. Released on $1,000 bail, Smith appealed the verdict. The case then dragged on for several years until it was finally dismissed.

== Overturned blasphemy laws ==
=== New York (1952): Joseph Burstyn, Inc. v. Wilson ===
The U.S. Supreme Court in Joseph Burstyn, Inc. v. Wilson, 343 U.S. 495 (1952) held that the New York State blasphemy law was an unconstitutional prior restraint on freedom of speech. The court stated that "It is not the business of government in our nation to suppress real or imagined attacks upon a particular religious doctrine, whether they appear in publications, speeches or motion pictures."

=== Pennsylvania (2010): Kalman v. Cortes ===
The Pennsylvania General Assembly enacted a blasphemy law in 1977, that forbade corporations from incorporating names containing words that "constitute blasphemy, profane cursing or swearing, or that profane the Lord's name." In 2007, filmmaker George Kalman had filed a limited liability company named I Choose Hell Productions, LLC. A week later he had received an unsigned letter explaining that his application was rejected because his company's name could not "contain words that constitute blasphemy." In February 2009, Kalman filed suit to have the provision against blasphemy struck down as unconstitutional. During the trial, Kalman explained that at one point he had become suicidal and felt he had to choose between death and hell. This became the inspiration for naming his film company, stories that he would tell about how to choose life. On June 30, 2010, U.S. District Judge Michael M. Bayslon of the Eastern District of Pennsylvania, in a 68-page opinion, ruled in favor of Kalman, finding that Pennsylvania's blasphemy statute violated both the Establishment Clause and the Free Exercise Clause of the First Amendment to the United States Constitution.
