= Robin Tanner =

Robin Tanner may refer to:

- Robin Tanner (artist)
- Robin Tanner (minister)
