= Commonwealth v. Kneeland =

Massachusetts Supreme Judicial Court case about blasphemy

- Court: Massachusetts Supreme Judicial Court
- Full case name: Commonwealth of Massachusetts v. Abner Kneeland
- Decided: March 1838
- Citation: 37 Mass. 206 (1838)

Case opinions
- Majority: Shaw; Dissent: Morton

Commonwealth of Massachusetts v. Abner Kneeland was an 1838 Massachusetts state court case, notable for being the last time a court in the United States jailed a defendant for blasphemy.

== Overview ==
The defendant, Abner Kneeland, was a mercurial preacher who had been a Universalist, but had since converted to a form of pantheism. He published letters in which he expounded on his recently adopted pantheist philosophy, denying any God other than Nature as well as the uniquely particular divinity of Jesus Christ. Already a controversial figure, Kneeland wrote a rationalist journal called the Boston Investigator. He was taken to court after he admitted having written such provocative statements in the December 20, 1833 issue. The legal indictment was for "willfully blaspheming the holy name of God" and for his public disavowal of Christ. Though the statements were written in 1833, Kneeland was ultimately tried four times due to delays and mistrials that failed to deliver a verdict. The first trial was in January 1834 and Kneeland was convicted, but he promptly appealed; the second case ended in a mistrial; the third trial November 1835 and Kneeland was found guilty; and the final appealed case was heard in 1838.

At trial, Kneeland was represented by Mr. Dunlap in the first two trials, and represented himself in the last two. They raised three defenses of his actions:

1. Kneeland claimed he never denied the existence of God, merely the existence of "a" God. Therefore, he was not an atheist, but rather a pantheist.
2. The law itself was invalid and should be overturned, as it was in violation with the Massachusetts Constitution's guarantee of religious freedom.
3. The law also violated the guarantee of freedom of the press.

The court was unconvinced by Kneeland's claims. It ruled that regardless of his beliefs, he had libeled God's name with malicious intent, rendering Kneeland's first point moot. As for the second, the court examined other states' colonial charters and pointed out that they too had reconciled blasphemy laws with guarantees of religious freedom, and that the law "was passed very soon after the adoption of the constitution, and no doubt, many members of the convention which framed the constitution, were members of the legislature which passed this law." Therefore, they must not conflict. Justice Shaw had also been present at the Massachusetts Constitutional Convention of 1820–1821, and found no conflict between the current constitution and the 1782 Act against Blasphemy. The court dismissed the third claim out of hand, saying that if unlimited freedom of the press was allowed,

the article in question become a general license for scandal, calumny and falsehood against individuals, institutions and governments, in the form of publication ... but all incitation to treason, assassination, and all other crimes however atrocious, if conveyed in printed language, would be dispunishable.

Kneeland was sentenced to sixty days in prison. Justice Morton did issue a dissent; in it, he argued that mere disavowal of God was not blasphemy, and punishable blasphemy was only attacking religion out of malice or intent to injure, a standard that was not met in this case. In Kneeland's support, a petition was put forward by for his pardon under grounds of free speech by William Ellery Channing, signed by various prominent people including Ralph Waldo Emerson and William Lloyd Garrison. However, a counter-petition was signed with even more signatures; Kneeland stayed in prison and served his entire term.

== See also ==
- Blasphemy law in the United States
- Charles Lee Smith, the last person in the US known to have been convicted on a blasphemy charge
