= Boston Investigator =

First American newspaper dedicated to philosophy of freethought

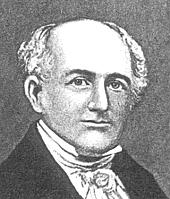
- Abner Kneeland, founder
- Type: Weekly newspaper
- Publisher: J. Q. Adams, George Chapman, Josiah P. Mendum
- Editor: Abner Kneeland, Horace Seaver
- Founded: 1831
- Ceased publication: 1904
- Political alignment: Freethought
- Headquarters: Boston, Massachusetts
- Circulation: 4,500 (1872)

The Boston Investigator was the first American newspaper dedicated to the philosophy of freethought. The newspaper was started in 1831 by Abner Kneeland, and published by John Q. Adams.

The newspaper was notable for its anti-religious view, regarding Christian beliefs with harsh skepticism.
