= Hermann van Flekwyk =

Hermann Van Flekwyk (or Vlekwijk, died June 10, 1569) was a Dutch Anabaptist, whose name has become memorable, in consequence of an examination for heresy conducted by the Franciscan Cornelius Adrians later translated.

Among the charges against Flekwyk: "You have sucked at the poisoned breast of Erasmus" and having "blasphemed against the true body and blood of God, by speaking against the Mass," To the charges Herman replied "Can you shed the blood of a good Christian?" He was executed at Bruges.
