= David Eaton (footballer) =

English footballer

Personal information
- Full name: David Franklin Eaton
- Date of birth: 30 September 1981 (age 45)
- Place of birth: Liverpool, England
- Height: 6 ft 2 in (1.88 m)
- Position: Forward

Youth career
- Everton

Senior career*
Years	Team	Apps	(Gls)
2001–2002	Everton	0	(0)
2002–2003	Macclesfield Town	20	(5)
2003	Witton Albion		
2003–2004	Stafford Rangers		
2004–200?	Burscough		
200?–2007	Leigh RMI		
2007	Marine		
2007	Skelmersdale United		
2007–20??	Bamber Bridge		
- A.F.C. Liverpool
- * Club domestic league appearances and goals

David Franklin Eaton (born 30 September 1981) is an English former professional footballer who played as a forward in the Football League for Macclesfield Town. He was on the books of Everton without playing for their first team, and also played non-league football for clubs including Witton Albion, Stafford Rangers, Burscough, Leigh RMI, Marine, Skelmersdale United, Bamber Bridge and A.F.C. Liverpool.
