= Francis M. Kneeland =

African-American physician

Francis M. Kneeland (born 1873) was an American physician. She was one of the first African American women doctors working in Memphis, where she had a practice located on Beale Street.

== Biography ==
Kneeland was born in 1873 in Memphis, Tennessee. When she was young, she was orphaned, though she continued to live with her family and even helped raise her younger siblings. In 1898, she was an honors graduate of Meharry, a medical school for African Americans. Kneeland established her practice in Memphis on Beale Street by 1907. She was one of the only black women doctors practicing in the city at the time. Kneeland also worked with the University of West Tennessee, where she was the head instructor in the nursing program in 1923. Kneeland also help rehabilitate juvenile delinquents and girls living in poverty who were sent to her by the Juvenile Court Judge, Camille Kelley.

Kneeland was involved in the Baptist church in various leadership roles. Later in life, she moved to Chicago to live with relatives.
