= Jesse Chickering =

American physician

- Born: August 31, 1797
- Died: May 29, 1855 (aged 57)

Jesse Chickering (born Dover, New Hampshire, August 31, 1797; died West Roxbury, Massachusetts, May 29, 1855) was a political economist. He graduated at Harvard in 1818, studied theology, and became a Unitarian minister. He afterward pursued a medical course, receiving his diploma in 1833, and practised medicine for about ten years in Boston and West Roxbury.

== Works ==
- Statistical View of the Population of Massachusetts from 1765 to 1840 (Boston, 1846)
- Emigration into the United States (1848)
- Reports on the Census of Boston (1851)
- Letter addressed to the President of the United States on Slavery, considered in Relation to the Principles of Constitutional Government in Great Britain and in the United States (1855)
