= Michael X. Mockus =

Lithuanian-American minister convicted of blasphemy

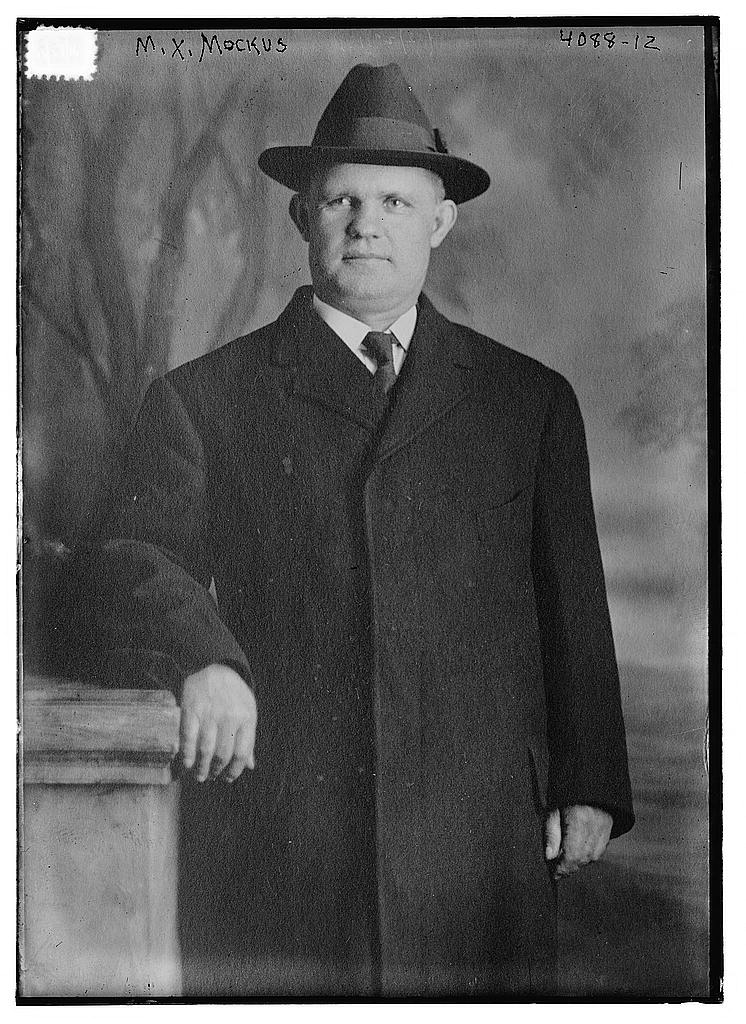
- Mockus in 1917
- Born: Mykolas Ksaveras Mockevičius; October 26, 1864; Ramanavas, Lazdijai District, Lithuania
- Died: October 23, 1939 (aged 74); Oak Forest, Illinois
- Known for: Blasphemy trials

Michael X. Mockus (October 26, 1864 – October 23, 1939) was a Lithuanian-American philosopher and former Unitarian minister. Mockus is remembered for having been convicted in nationally publicized trials for having violated archaic Connecticut and Maine state laws prohibiting blasphemy as a result of his public challenges of certain points of Christian orthodox religious belief.

== Biography ==
Mykolas Ksaveras Mockevičius was born on October 26, 1864, in Ramanavas, Lithuania. In 1886, he emigrated to United States and Americanized his name as Michael Xavier Mockus. Initially he worked at coal mines then at a cement factory in Detroit, Michigan. There he bought a small press and published Lithuanian and Polish brochures and booklets. He became active in various Lithuanian-American societies.

Initially a devout Catholic, Mockus turned to Protestantism. He graduated from a seminary in Fairmount, Ohio and was ordained a minister in the Unitarian church. He toured various Lithuanian communities delivering speeches and sermons. Around 1908 he switched to atheism and freethought. He made a career delivering speeches that mocked religious tenets. The speeches were highly controversial and attracted large crowds. The churchgoers would attempt to disrupt the meetings with measures ranging from catcalls to threats of violence. The police would get involved on the basis that Mockus was speaking without a permit, disturbing the peace, or inciting to anarchy, but he would escape more serious charges on the basis of free speech.

He was charged with and found guilty of blasphemy in Waterbury, Connecticut, in 1916 and in Rumford, Maine, in 1917. The Supreme Judicial Court of Maine upheld his conviction in March 1921. Instead of serving the one to two years sentence in prison, Mockus escaped to Mexico. He lived there for five years before returning to United States. Upon his return he retired from public life and died on October 23, 1939 in Oak Forest, Illinois.

== Blasphemy cases ==
=== Connecticut ===
On July 17, 1916, Mockus was invited to lecture to the Lithuanian Freethought Association of Waterbury, Connecticut, speaking in Lithuanian. He was charged with blasphemy under the 1821 affirmation of the 1642 blasphemy law. The law provided the maximum sentence of one-year imprisonment and a $100 fine. He was the first person convicted under the law and was sentenced to 10 days imprisonment. For his appeal, Mockus retained Theodore Schroeder of the Free Speech League as his attorney. He lost the appeal, but never served the sentence.

=== Maine ===
In 1917, Mockus gave a series of lectures in Rumford, Maine, on atheism. According to trial testimony, Mockus is alleged to have made the following eight statements:

(1) "Mary (meaning the Virgin Mary) had a beau. When her beau called one evening (both being young) he seduced her. He brought her a flower and put her in a family way. No woman can give birth to a child without a man."

(2) "The father of Christ was a young Jew and was no Angel Gabriel. Any girl who wants a child can call a Gabriel or some John."

(3) "Religion, capitalism, and government are all damned humbugs, liars, and thieves. Those three classes combine into one organization.

(4) "All religions are a deception of the people."

(5) "A young man came to Mary during the night, and, coming near her with a flower in his hand, took her by the hand and said: 'Sh; sh.' Look how the priests teach you, the falsifiers, thieves. It is not possible that he could be of the Holy Ghost, there must be a man. A young Jew was the father of the Christ. No woman can have a child without a man; that never happened and never can happen."

(6) "You see the Trinity (pointing to a picture of God, Jesus Christ, and the Holy Ghost, which he had caused to be thrown upon a screen), God the Father, Ghost, and Son, a young Jew, but that old man never was and never can be; if he was God from the Ghost, then where did that belly button come from which is sprouted like a button? Bear in mind that the black army is a trinity, clergy, capitalism, and government; they govern the world together."

(7) "There is no truth in the Bible; it is only monkey business. Religion, capitalism, and government are a black army and only profiteer from the poor people. You see here (pointing to a picture of God, Jesus Christ, and the Holy Ghost, which he had caused to be thrown upon a screen) scarecrows. Here is God the Father, Son, and Ghost, a whole Trinity, just as the priest, capitalists, and government. How can the Holy Ghost be God when she is afraid a cat will kill her? And do you believe in these scarecrows?"

(8) "You see this fool (pointing to a picture of Jesus Christ upon the cross, with the private parts of his body covered with a cloth, which he had caused to be thrown upon a screen) and you believe in Him. The women were sorry for the holy thing and covered the holy thing, while the rest of the body was left uncovered."

Mockus was arrested under Maine's blasphemy law which reads: "Blasphemy may be committed either by using profanely insolent and reproachful language against God, or by contumeliously reproaching Him, His creation, government, final judgment of the world, Jesus Christ, the Holy Ghost, or the Holy Scriptures as contained in the canonical books of the Old and New Testament, or by exposing any of these enumerated Beings or Scriptures to contempt and ridicule, and it is not necessary for the state to prove the doing of all of them."

He was found guilty by a jury trial in 1917 for his eight statements. An appeal of the conviction went to the Supreme Judicial Court of Maine as State v. Mockus. The conviction was upheld by that body on March 25, 1921.

== See also ==
- Anthony Bimba
