= David Hilliard Eaton =

African-American minister (1932 – 1992)

Rev. David Hilliard Eaton (1932 – October 21, 1992) was the first African-American minister of All Souls Church, Unitarian of Washington, D.C., and an influential citizen of Washington DC politics from the 1960s until his death. Under his leadership, the All Souls Church became a center of social activism, with a racially balanced congregation.

== Early life and education ==
Eaton was born in Washington, D.C. After graduating from Dunbar High School, he earned a bachelor's degree in 1954 from Howard University. He earned his S.T.B. and M. Div. degrees at the Boston University School of Theology. Eaton served as a Second Lieutenant with the newly integrated Fourth Infantry Division in Germany in 1954. He was ordained a Methodist minister in 1957. In 1961, Eaton returned to Washington, D.C. as the Methodist chaplain for Howard University, where he later served as registrar.

== All Souls Church ==
In 1969, Eaton became the minister of All Souls Church, which then had a primarily white congregation, although the neighborhood was becoming predominantly black. Eaton was not only the first black minister at All Souls but of any large UU church. Eaton was a close advisor to Washington mayor Marion Barry, one of the church's congregants.

One of Eaton's first sermons, a May 1970 critique of Nixon legislation that would allow police to invade homes without knocking, stoked widespread controversy. The sermon, entitled "Take the Blindfold Off the Lady: The D.C. Crime Bill," included the line: "If this legislation is passed, I suggest to you and instruct myself . . . [that] any time persons break into your house unannounced, shoot them!" He went on: "In order to understand true morality, one must understand that oppression must be stopped at all cost."

== Non-church activities ==
Eaton was a long-time at-large member of the District of Columbia State Board of Education, serving from 1981 until his death. He served as the school board president from 1982 to 1985.

In 1964, Eaton founded the Washington Institute for Employment Training, which became the local branch of the Opportunities Industrialization Center.

In 1968, Eaton joined the faculty of Federal City College as associate dean of community education and assistant professor of philosophy. In later years he served as dean of student services.

For about 15 years from the 1960s to 1970s, Eaton was the host of "Speakup", a late-night call-in show on WOL (AM), which ran from 11 pm to 1 am Sunday night into Monday morning.

== Death and burial ==
Eaton died from complications due to Hepatitis B. Eaton is interred in Arlington National Cemetery.

== Honors and awards ==
- The Washingtonian of the Year Award from Washingtonian magazine (1976)
- The Citizen of the Year Award from the local chapter of the National Association of Social Workers (1976)
- The Man-of-the-Year Award from the Shiloh Baptist Church in Washington (1983)
- The UUA Clarence Skinner Award for his sermon "Racism is Alive and Well" (1985)
- An honorary doctorate from the Starr King School for the Ministry (1986)
- The Man of the Year Award from the YMCA of Metropolitan Washington (1990)
- The UUA Holmes-Weatherly Award for commitment to social justice (1992)
