= Annie Bizzell Jordan Willis =

Annie Bizzell Jordan Willis (May 30, 1893 – c. 1977) was an American religious educator and integrationist of the Universalist and later Unitarian Universalist faith traditions. She was the daughter of Rev. Joseph Fletcher Jordan, the third African American Universalist minister. She became a teacher and the superintendent of Suffolk Normal Training School (SNTS) and Jordan Neighborhood House. For decades, she taught and supported hundreds of children and their families, regardless of the varying degrees of assistance from her religious denomination. Her life and work are examples of 20th century anti-racism in the United States and the Unitarian Universalist religious faith. Some of her students include trauma surgeon L.D. Britt, Suffolk's vice mayor and activist Moses Riddick, and Suffolk Circuit Court Deputy Clerk Eula Williams, among many others.

== Birth and early life ==
Annie Bizzell Jordan was born in Louisburg, North Carolina. Her father, Joseph Fletcher Jordan, was a Presbyterian minister, but felt conflicted about the doctrine of eternal punishment. When Annie was seven, he left the Presbyterian ministry. Two years later, he became one of the first African American Universalist ministers. The 2019 Harper-Jordan Memorial Symposium for Black Unitarian Universalists was named, in part, after him.

In 1904, the Jordan family moved to Suffolk, Virginia. They began running the Suffolk Normal Training School (SNTS), a Universalist mission school for black students. By 1909, the school had 184 students and three teachers. Young Annie began work as a teaching assistant at the school and became active in the Young People's Christian Union (YPCU).

Jordan attended the Norfolk Mission College where she met Richard L. Willis. They married and settled in Norfolk, with Jordan Wills commuting from Norfolk to Suffolk to continue teaching at SNTS. In 1915, they welcomed a daughter, Dorothy, and in 1917, they moved their family to Suffolk. Richard soon chose to return to Norfolk alone and later enlisted in WWI.

== Suffolk Normal Training School ==
In 1929, Joseph Fletcher Jordan became ill and died. With the Universalists' backing, Jordan Willis stepped into his role and became the superintendent of SNTS. As superintendent, she strengthened the Universalist missional focus of the school, even using a Universalist Sunday school curriculum to teach classes.

The school was located in a two-story building on the corner of Tynes Street and Johnson Avenue, near a peanut processing plant. Many black parents worked there in two shifts which ran from 7 a.m. until 6 p.m.. The school's services were crucial to these families.

Jordan Willis and SNTS provided crucial resources to the Suffolk community during the Great Depression. But the needs of the community began to exceed the capacity of the school and its staff. The institution of Universalism, too, was struggling financially. In response to their lack of resources, the Universalist leadership in Boston pressured Jordan Willis to change the focus of SNTS from education to social service. By this time, public schools were providing integrated educational services. The Universalists reasoned that there was greater need for social services. Jordan Willis resisted this change, wanting to preserve the school's educational programs, but eventually gave in.

== Jordan Neighborhood House ==
Jordan Willis' school was renamed the Jordan Neighborhood House, after Jordan Willis and her father. It began providing social services such as pre-natal care, well-baby clinics, and music programs for teenagers. The kindergarten remained, but the integrated educational offerings for which the school was known were greatly diminished. Along with this change in focus, Jordan Willis was removed from leadership and now required to follow the direction of the predominantly white male Universalist leadership in Boston.

In 1949, the new Universalist Service Committee (USC) was granted jurisdiction over the Jordan Neighborhood House. They invested in her staff and facilities, improving the relationship between the Universalists and Jordan Willis. The USC also returned the focus to education — supporting Jordan Willis in opening an integrated Head Start preschool program as the Association of Universalist Women supported the kindergarten with a funded co-director position.

In 1961, following the merger of the Unitarians and Universalists, tensions arose regarding the nature of short- vs long-term mission work. Amid these tensions, support for long-term missions—and thus support for the Jordan Neighborhood House—weakened considerably. Although the UUSC established a corporation to oversee Jordan House, it did not sufficiently resource or support the organization or its leader. In 1967, the UUSC chose to terminate its sponsorship of the Jordan Neighborhood House.

Even without the support of the UUSC, Jordan Willis succeeded at keeping the doors of the Jordan kindergarten open, overseeing the education there until her retirement in 1974. She continued living in the school's living quarters until her death in 1977. Her final words were spoken to her successor at the Jordan kindergarten: "Watch out for my children." The Jordan kindergarten outlived Jordan Willis by seven years, closing its doors in 1984.
