= Izidorius Mockus =

Lithuanian guerilla fighter (1920–1950)

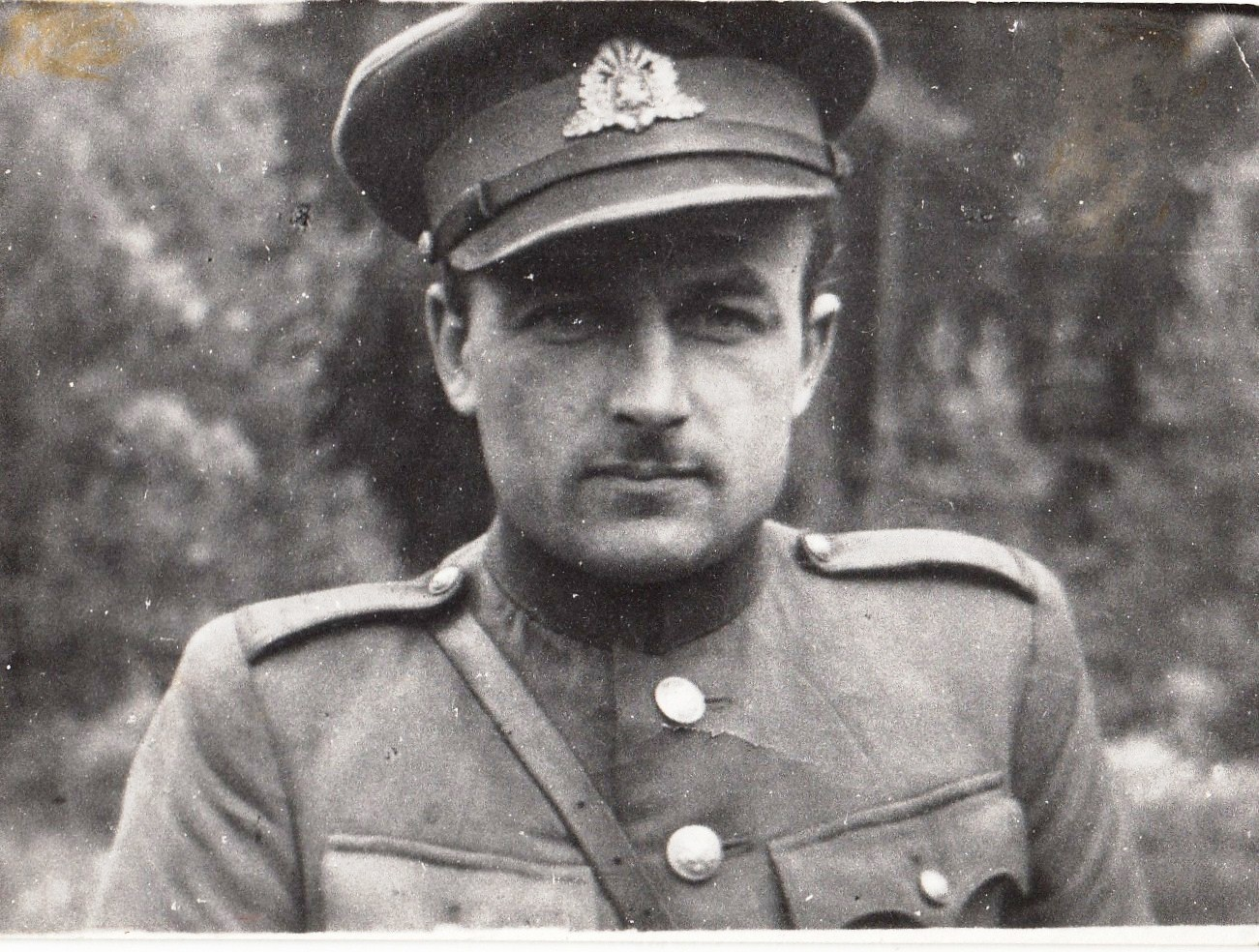
- Izidorius Mockus-Rikas in the forest, ca 1946
- Born: 1920; Rudžiai, Lithuania
- Died: 1950; Šakalinė forest (a part of Karšuva Forest), Lithuanian SSR, USSR
- Cause of death: Gunshot wounds
- Known for: Lithuanian anti-Soviet partisan and leader of Rolandas' squad
- Spouse: not married
- Parent(s): Juozas Mockus and Rozalija Dirginčiūtė-Mockienė

Izidorius Mockus codenames Rikas, Rykas, Jovaras (1920 – June 16 or July 10, 1950) was a Lithuanian forest brother who led Rolandas' squad (a part of Butigeidis corps, Kęstutis district).

== Life ==
He was born in the village of Rudžiai (currently Eržvilkas elderate, Jurbarkas District Municipality) in a family of peasants. He was the oldest of three children. The family possessed 13 hectares of land, spanning from Milaičiai Manor from the one side to the river Šaltuona in the other. Mockus' father died when Mockus was about 18 years old.

At the time of the Second occupation of Lithuania by the Soviet Union, Mockus joined the forest brothers and eventually became a leader of Rolandas' squad (a part of the larger Kęstutis district). His younger sister Ona, codename Genovaitė, also joined the resistance as an active supporter (ryšininkė in Lithuanian), but was captured and deported to Siberia in the late 1940s.

Mockus was killed in 1950 after the betrayal while convoying his fellow brother-in-arms Jonas Stoškus-Eimutis in Šakalinė forest, near the Lake Bivainiai (currently Tauragė district municipality). In total, 10 partisans were killed in this operation, conducted by the Soviet forces.

A memorial in Tauragė, dedicated to local partisans previously buried in the former prison yard of Tauragė NKVD, also includes the name of Izidorius Mockus.
