= A. Powell Davies =

Unitarian clergyman

- Born: Arthur Powell Davies; June 5, 1902; Birkenhead, England
- Died: September 26, 1957 (aged 55); Washington, DC
- Citizenship: England, United States
- Education: Richmond Theological College
- Occupations: Minister, theologian
- Spouse: Muriel Hannah Davies (m. 1927)

Ecclesiastical career
- Religion: Methodism; Unitarianism
- Congregations: Becontree Methodist Central Hall; Unitarian Church in Summit; All Souls Church, Unitarian

Arthur Powell Davies (June 5, 1902 – September 26, 1957) was an English and American minister and theologian. He served as the minister of All Souls Church, Unitarian in Washington, D.C. from 1944 until his death in 1957. A prolific author of theological books and sermon collections, he came to national prominence in the U.S. through his liberal activism advocating civil rights for African-Americans and women and ethical stands against post-war nuclear proliferation and the methods employed by the American government during the era of McCarthyism.

== Biography ==
Arthur Powell Davies was born on June 5, 1902, in Birkenhead, England (near Liverpool) to Welsh parents, Davies was raised a Methodist. After working briefly as a clerk for a shipping company, he moved to London as secretary to a strike leader who had been elected Labour MP. In London, he met George Bernard Shaw, who urged him to go into politics; instead, he chose to attend Richmond Theological College, a Methodist seminary affiliated with the University of London, and to join the Methodist ministry. While studying, he met Muriel Hannah (1906–2009), the daughter of his family's Methodist minister, and they were married in 1927.

Davies served as minister at the Becontree Methodist Central Hall in Ilford, a London suburb, 1925–28, before moving to America. He headed three churches in Maine: in Goodwin's Mills and Clark's Mills, (commuting to Boston University for classes), and, from 1929, the Pine Street Methodist Church in Portland. In Portland, he worked as a used car salesman for a week in order to investigate the question of whether or not it was possible to be a businessman and adhere to "Christian" honesty and integrity; he then wrote a strong critique of prevailing business practices.

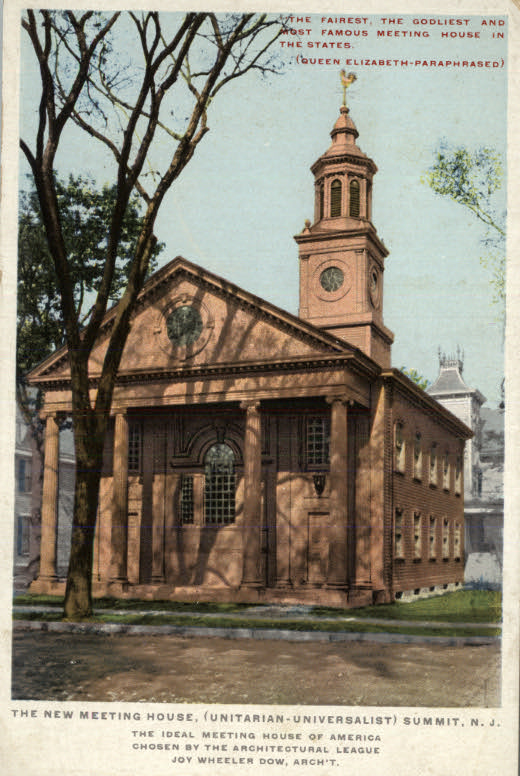
Davies was minister at the Unitarian Church in Summit from 1933 through 1944.

Also in Portland, Davies was exposed to Unitarian ideas by Vincent Silliman, minister at the First Parish Unitarian Church there. In 1933 Davies became a Unitarian, joining the American Unitarian Association (AUA), and became minister of the Community Church of Summit, New Jersey which had allied itself with the Community Church movement. He reaffiliated the church to the Unitarian denomination, with the new name Unitarian Church in Summit, and at the same time calling for an opening up of the denomination.

While preferring non-violence, he moved his position from appeasement of Germany in 1938 to interventionist in 1939. He thenceforth advocated Unitarian activism in world questions, and became a leader in the reform movement, Unitarian Advance. His first book was American Destiny (1942), in which he advanced the idea that American "faith in [individual] freedom is the only faith which can unite the world." Citing the Boston minister, William Ellery Channing (1780–1842), who had called Unitarianism the "universal church", Davies became increasingly active in denominational affairs. He joined the New York City Council of Churches, where he met and befriended the Unitarian activist minister John Haynes Holmes (1879–1964), and became acquainted with Margaret Sanger (1879–1966), the founder of Planned Parenthood.

In 1944 Davies was appointed minister of All Souls Church, Unitarian in Washington, D.C., a church which he led to national prominence through his activist and principled ethical stands. He advocated the Atomic Energy Act of 1946 and, while generally against Communism, decried the methods and hearings of the House Un-American Activities Committee (HUAC). He championed integration in Washington and elsewhere. He actively spearheaded the creation of Unitarian churches in the area, organizing in 1950 what is now known as the Greater Washington Association of Unitarian Universalist Churches (GWA) and serving as its chair, 1950–57.

Davies used his pulpit to champion liberal causes and was a friend and confidant to some of Washington's most powerful people. Justice Hugo Black considered him a very good friend and it is fair to say that his ideas were influential in liberal political circles.

Davies received an honorary Doctor of Divinity degree from the Meadville Lombard Theological School in 1947 and an honorary Doctor of Humanities degree from Howard University in 1955.

Dedicated to his work, Davies ignored his physicians' advice to restrict his movements after he was operated on in 1953 for thrombophlebitis in his leg. He continued his routine schedule as much as discomfort and pain would permit. On September 26, 1957, a blood clot traveled to his lung where it caused fatal hemorrhaging. A memorial service was held for Davies two days later at All Souls. Three sitting Supreme Court Justices—Hugo Black, Harold Burton, and William O. Douglas—honored him by attending the service.

Following his death, some of his papers were bequeathed to Harvard Divinity School, however, the majority of Davies' papers reside at Meadville Lombard Theological School.

== Published works ==
=== Books ===
- Davies, A. Powell (1937). The Man from Nazareth. Washington, DC: All Souls Church, Unitarian.
- —— (1946). The Faith of an Unrepentant Liberal. Boston: Beacon Press.
- —— (1949). America's Real Religion. Boston: Beacon Press.
- —— (1951). Man's Vast Future: A Definition of Democracy. New York: Farrar, Straus and Young.
- —— (1952). Religion in the Bible. Beacon Reference Series. Boston: Beacon Press.
- —— (1953). The Urge to Persecute. Boston: Beacon Press.
- —— (1956). The Language of the Heart. New York: Farrar, Staus and Cudahy.
- —— (1956). The Meaning of the Dead Sea Scrolls. Mentor Books. ISBN 9780451626196.
- —— (1956). The Ten Commandments. New York: New American Library.
- —— (1957). The First Christian: A Study of St. Paul and Christian Origins. New York: Farrar, Straus and Cudahy.

=== Collected sermons ===
- Douglas, William O., ed. (1959). The Mind and Faith of A. Powell Davies. Garden City, NY: Doubleday.
- Davies, A. Powell (1998). Church, Forrest (ed.). Without Apology: Collected Meditations on Liberal Religion. Boston: Skinner House.
- —— (1999). Five Favorites: A Collection of Popular Timely Sermons. Washington, DC: All Souls Church, Unitarian.
- "23 Sermons from Davies Memorial Unitarian Universalist Church Archive". 16 March 2013.

== Biographical works ==
- Marshall, George N. (1990). A. Powell Davies and His Times. Boston: Skinner House.
- A. Powell Davies Memorial Committee (1958). A. Powell Davies: 1902-1957.
- Douglas, William O. (1959). "Introduction". In Douglas, William O. Douglas (ed.). The Mind and Faith of A. Powell Davies. Garden City, NY: Doubleday.
- Staples, Laurence (1970). Washington Unitarianism.
- Schulz, William (1979). "The Minister and McCarthyism: A. Powell Davies and Post-War Hysteria". In Kauffman, Peter; Lavan, Spencer Lavan (eds.). Alone Together.
- Stutzman, R. (1991). A. Powell Davies: Some Remembrances.
- Greater Washington Area Minister's Study Group Paper.
- Marshall, George N. (1992). "A. Powell Davies: Theological Radical". Religious Humanism.

== Quotes ==
- "The religions of the creeds are obsolescent...the basis of their claims expired with yesterday."
- "It (liberalism) causes us to put our trust in the free exertions of our own minds instead of in the dogmas of the long established churches."
- "This ancient God of miracles and interventions... is really dead. There is no longer any kindness in letting anyone cling to such a fantasy. For if that is where we put our faith, our dependence, or reliance, we shall be wiped off the face of the earth."
- "There is no God in the sky. God is in the heart that loves the sky's blueness. There is no army of angels, no hosts of seraphim and no celestial hierarchy. All this is man's imaginings."
- ”Let me tell you why I come to church. I come to church—and would whether I was a preacher or not—because I fall below my own standards and need to be constantly brought back to them. I am afraid of becoming selfish and indulgent, and my church—my church of the free spirit—brings me back to what I want to be. I could easily despair: doubt and dismay could overwhelm me. My church renews my courage and my hope. It is not enough that I should think about the world and its problems at the level of a newspaper report or magazine discussion. It could too soon become too low a level. I must have my conscience sharpened—sharpened until it goads me to the most thorough and responsible thinking of which I am capable. I must feel again the love I owe to others. I must not only hear about it but feel it. In church, I do. I am brought toward my best, in every way toward my best.”

== Bibliography ==
- "Dignitaries Pay Tribute to the Late Dr. Davies", The Washington Post (September 29, 1957).
- Arthur Powell Davies papers 1937-1957, Harvard Divinity School
- The Mind and Faith of A. Powell Davies, edited by William O. Douglas (1959)
- George N. Marshall, A. Powell Davies and His Times (1990)
- "A. Powell Davies", Manish Mishra-Marzetti (2003), Dictionary of Unitarian and Universalist Biography
