= János Füzi =

János Füzi (de Homoródkarácsonyfalva) (1776 – Kolozsvár, 6 October 1833) was a Unitarian minister, teacher.

== Life ==
He was the elder brother of Ferenc Füzi. He studied in Székelykeresztúr and Kolozsvár. Later he studied at the University of Göttingen. He didn't have to pay any tuition fee. When he arrived home, he started to teach philosophy in the Unitarian College of Kolozsvár. At the same time he served as a priest too. He was awarded as a priest in 1824. At the same time he was a general notarius. He had a stroke in 1830 so he couldn't work as a priest or teacher. He wrote textbooks, which are available as manuscripts.

== Sources ==
- Szinnyei, József (2000), Magyar írók élete és munkái [Life and Works of Hungarian Writers] (in Hungarian), Budapest: Arcanum, ISBN 978-9638602992
