= Beacon Unitarian Universalist Congregation in Summit =

Coordinates: 40°43′7″N 74°21′15″W

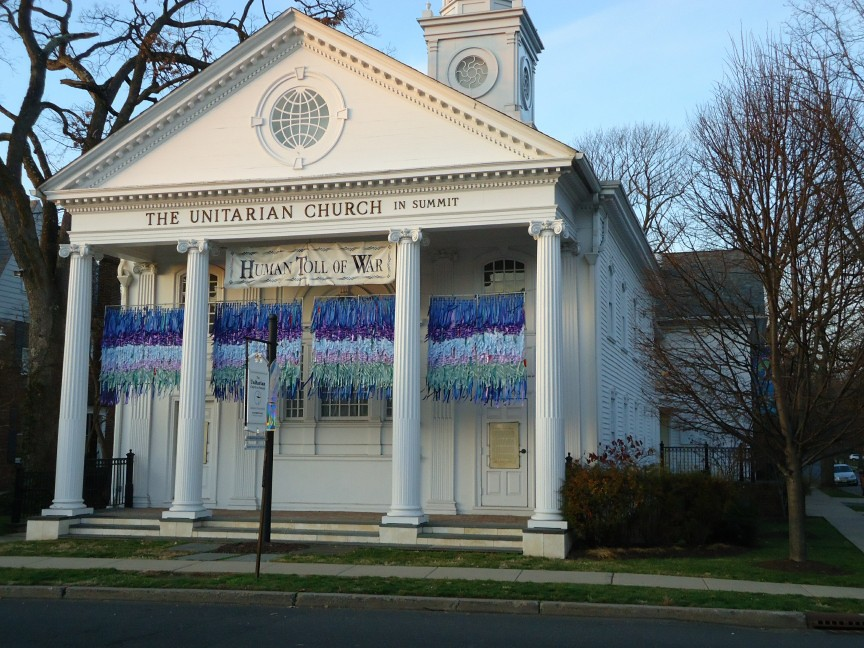
- Beacon Unitarian Universalist Congregation in Summit
- Location: Summit, New Jersey
- Country: United States
- Denomination: Unitarian Universalist Association
- Website: summitbeacon.org

History
- Status: Church
- Founded: 1908
- Founder: Area residents

Architecture
- Functional status: Active
- Architect: Joy Wheeler Dow
- Architectural type: Colonial "meeting house"
- Completed: 1913

Beacon Unitarian Universalist Congregation in Summit is a Unitarian Universalist ("UU") congregation in Summit, New Jersey, United States, formally organized in 1908 as The Unitarian Church in Summit. It is active in social justice initiatives and received the Unitarian Universalist Service Committee Social Justice Award in 2010. It has also been recognized as an outstanding UU congregation by various UU groups. In 2016, Robin Tanner became the Minister of Worship and Outreach.

== History ==
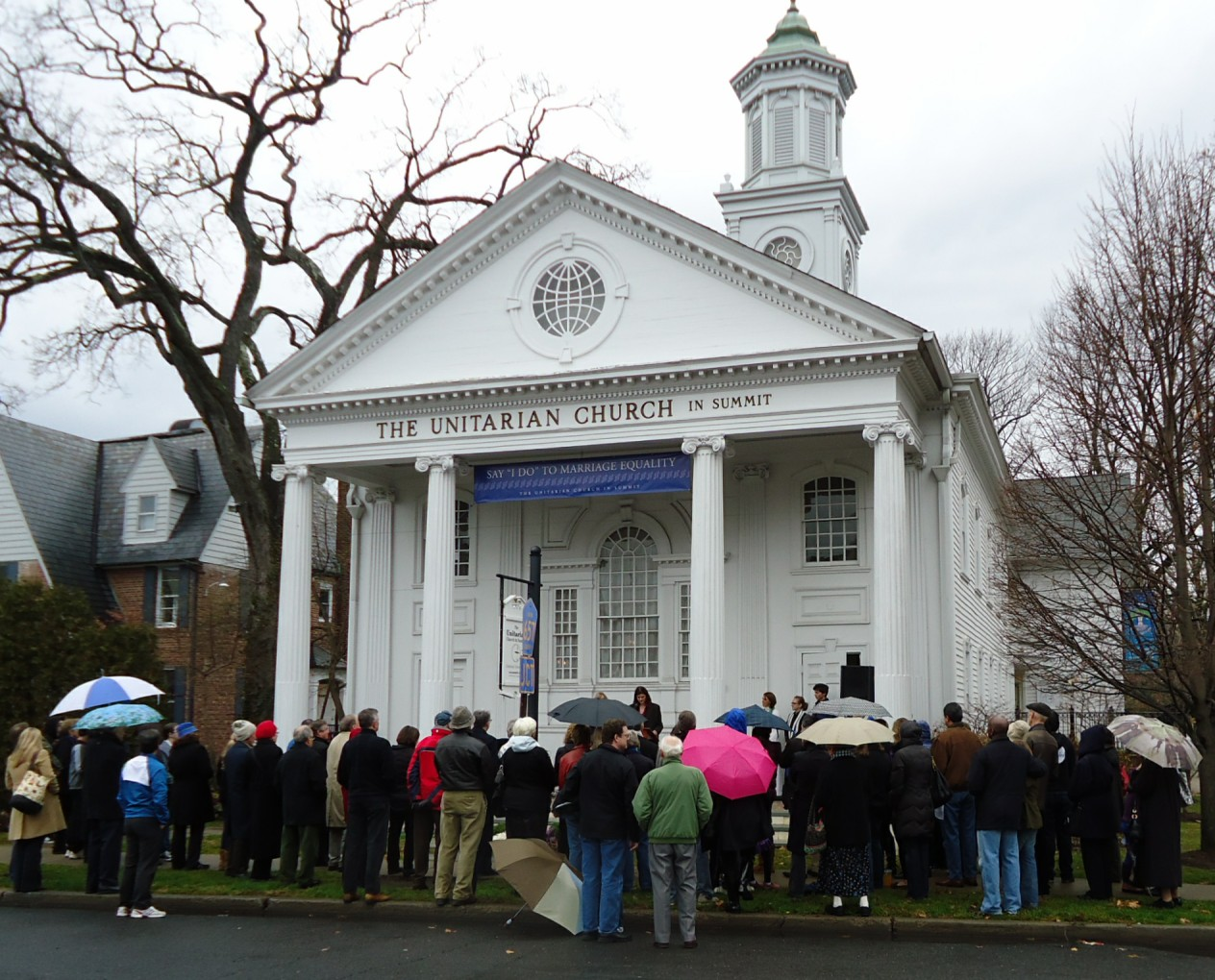
A rally outside the church in 2012 advocating marriage equality in the state of New Jersey.

Beacon UU was founded by area residents who felt that Summit needed a liberal church, emphasizing ethics and love as the core of religion, and encouraging all members to search for their own religious truths. Seventeen charter members of the church called Reverend Brown to be the first minister.

The group met in rented locations until funds were allocated to construct a building at the current location on Springfield and Waldron Avenues. An existing house (later called "Community House") was moved up Waldron to make room for a new building facing Springfield Avenue. Architect and member Joy Wheeler Brown designed the building to reflect the style of Colonial New England meeting houses, and incorporated elements of St. Paul's Chapel in New York City and King's Chapel in Boston. Construction began in 1912 and the sanctuary was formally dedicated on October 21, 1913. Also in 1912, the church adopted the name All Souls' Church, Unitarian-Universalist, having members from both denominations.

In 1914, the church called Frank C. Doan, a pacifist who voiced his opposition to war in April, 1917, when the United States joined in the "Great War." This was extremely unpopular in New Jersey, and given strong criticism from the state's newspapers, he offered his resignation to the board of trustees. They refused it.

From 1933 to 1944, A. Powell Davies was the minister. A former Methodist, he had a profound influence on the church and also on the Unitarian movement. In 1942, a convocation of Unitarian ministers was held in Summit to develop a Unitarian statement of faith. Davies convinced the church, then unaffiliated and named the "Summit Community Church," that since it was accepting support from the American Unitarian Association, it should rejoin the Unitarian Association.

In 1945, the church called Jacob Trapp, a theist and a poet. He was the minister until 1970. He also took inspiration from St. Francis and wrote his own translation of the Tao Te Ching. During Trapp's tenure, the church grew considerably, drawing many members from Bell Labs. Among these were Harold Black, inventor of the negative feedback amplifier, and James William Welsh.

The years from 1970 to 1988 saw half a dozen ministers and interims, and reduction in the church membership, before David Bumbaugh served from 1988 to 1999, after which he became professor of ministry at Meadville/Lombard Theological School. In 1995, the church called its first woman minister, Beverley Bumbaugh, David's wife.

In the 1990s, the steeple became structurally unsound, and was removed.

Under the leadership of minister Vanessa Southern (2001–2014), Summit membership grew to 529 members in 2012. In late 2011, the congregation voted to pursue the purchase of an adjacent property.

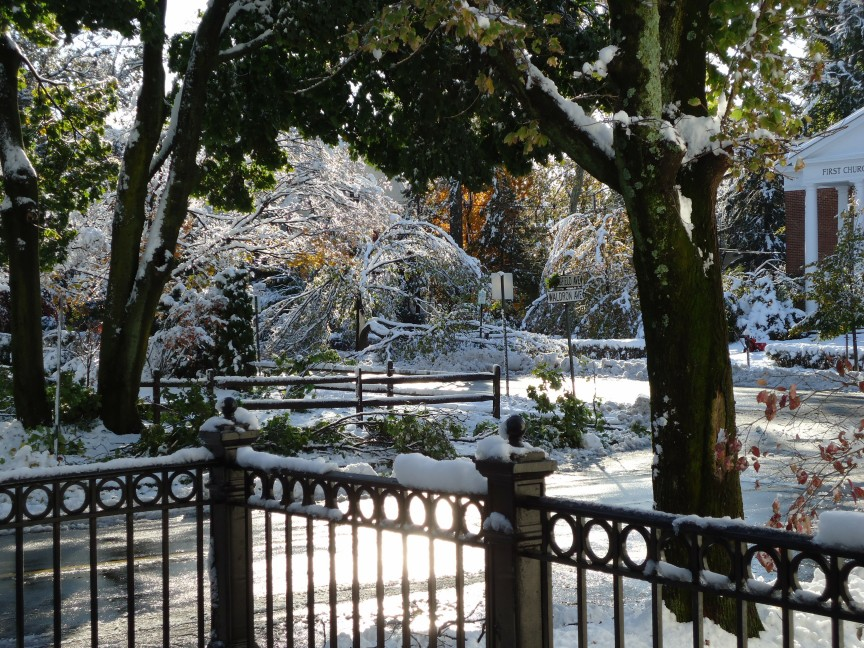
View from the entranceway of the Unitarian church following an early snowstorm in October 2011. Photo: looking across Waldron Avenue towards Springfield Avenue.

== Governance ==
Beacon UU has an unusual leadership model, combining two ordained ministers with a lay executive director. The staff also includes a music director, a Director of Religious Education, a Religious Education Coordinator, a Stewardship Director, a Membership and Youth Coordinator, and a sexton.

== Programs ==
Beacon UU holds two traditional Sunday morning services along with religious education classes for children during each service. On Sunday nights, the Youth Group holds a Worship Service.

In 2007, the congregation began its involvement with The Irvington Initiative, a partnership between the congregation and the Chancellor Avenue School in Irvington, NJ. Beacon's Social Justice Committee provides tutoring, educational workshops, holiday gifts, and fund-raising events for the children in the largely African-American school. Also in 2007, members of the congregation started the "Moving Toward Peace" initiative. The congregation voted to call for an end to the war in Iraq, began a weekly tradition of striking a gong for each service member killed that week in Iraq or Afghanistan, and prepared a wall of ribbons, one ribbon for each service member killed, to display in front of the building on Springfield Avenue. In 2010, UCS was named a "Breakthrough Congregation" at the Unitarian Universalist General Assembly and received the first Social Justice Congregation Award from the Unitarian Universalist Service Committee "for its efforts to advance human rights work in collaboration with UUSC."

Beacon UU is an active member of the Summit Interfaith Council, a coalition of 19 local religious groups that “seek the welfare of the city.” Rev. Emilie Boggis was president in 2014-2015 and the previous minister, Rev. Vanessa Southern, has also been president.

Beacon UU has had a partner Unitarian church in Barot, Transylvania (Romania), since 1992. The partnership includes visits from Barot to Summit, and vice versa, and Beacon provides some financial support for the Barot church and scholarships for university students.

The congregation has sponsored numerous talks on such subjects as racial justice, experiences of civil rights protesters in the 1960s, readings of speeches by Martin Luther King Jr., "intentional integration," Darfur refugees, healthier eating and diet, shamanism, meditation, and other topics. Beacon UU cooperated with other churches on a project entitled Raise the Roof to build affordable housing for persons in Summit, working alongside Habitat for Humanity. It held an annual garage sale from 1977 to 2010.

=== Music ===
The music program is headed by Mitchell Vines, Director. It is varied, and features an Afternoon music series, including performances by jazz pianist Bill Charlap and harpist Elaine Christy. The church has hosted numerous concerts by musicians, including Vibraphonist Makoto Nakura, violist Kenji Bunch, Violinist Deborah Buck, and numerous other artists and performers.

== Ministers ==
Ministers
Years	Name	Notes
1908-1911	Frederic Curtis Brown	
1911-1913	Howard Colby Ives	
1914-1917	Frank Carleton Doan	
1918-1919	Arthur G. Singsen	
1919-1920	Frank Carleton Doan	
1921-1927	Oscar B. Hawes	
1927-1932	Stuart L. Tyson	
1929-1931	Dayton T. Yoder	Assistant
1933–1944	Arthur Powell Davies	
1945–1970	Jacob Trapp	
1970-1974	Deane Starr	
1975-1977	Peter W. Denny	
1977-1978	Horace F. Westwood	
1979-1985	Jan Vickery Knost	
1985-1987	Richard M. Woodman	Interim
1987-1988	Alfred J.N. Henriksen	Interim
1988–1999	David E. Bumbaugh Jr.	
1995–1998	Beverly A. Bumbaugh	
1996-2003	Carol S. Haag	M.R.E.
1999-2000	George Kimmich Beach	Interim
2000-2001	Oren A. Peterson	Interim
2001–2014	Vanessa Southern	
2005-2014	Emilie Boggis	Assistant Minister
2011-2014	Kimberly Wildszewski	Assistant Minister of Congregational Life
2014–2016	Terry Sweetser	Interim Minister of Worship and Outreach
2015–present	Emilie Boggis	Minister of Congregational Life
2017–present	Robin Noelle Tanner	Minister of Worship and Outreach
