= All Souls Church, Unitarian (Washington, D.C.) =

Historic church in Washington, D.C., United States

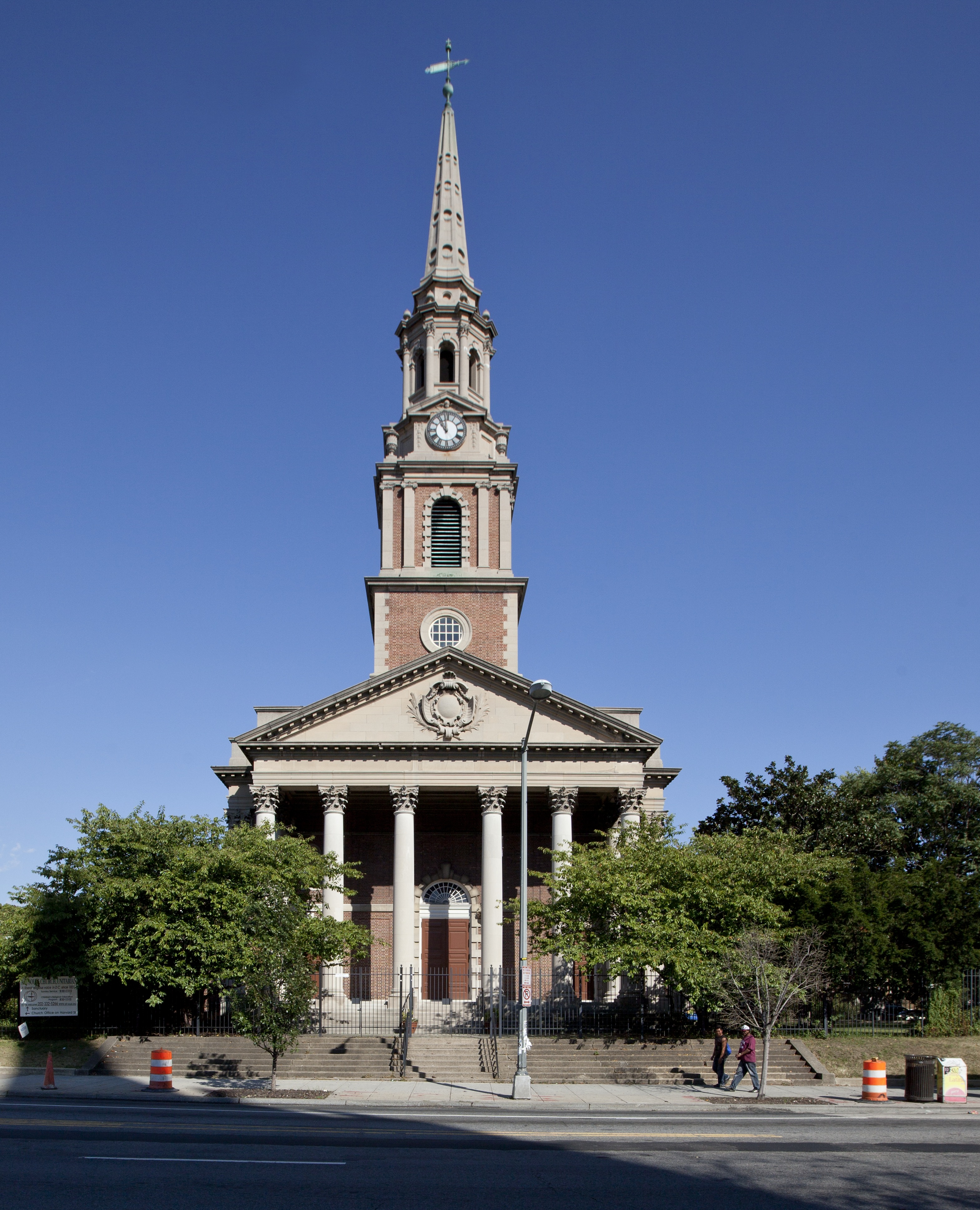
- All Souls Church, Unitarian
- 38.925964°N 77.036036°W
- Location: Washington, D.C.
- Country: U.S.
- Denomination: Unitarian Universalism
- Website: www.all-souls.org

History
- Status: Church
- Founded: 1821

Architecture
- Functional status: Active
- All Souls Church, Unitarian
- U.S. National Register of Historic Places
- NRHP reference No.: 100005905
- Added to NRHP: December 7, 2020

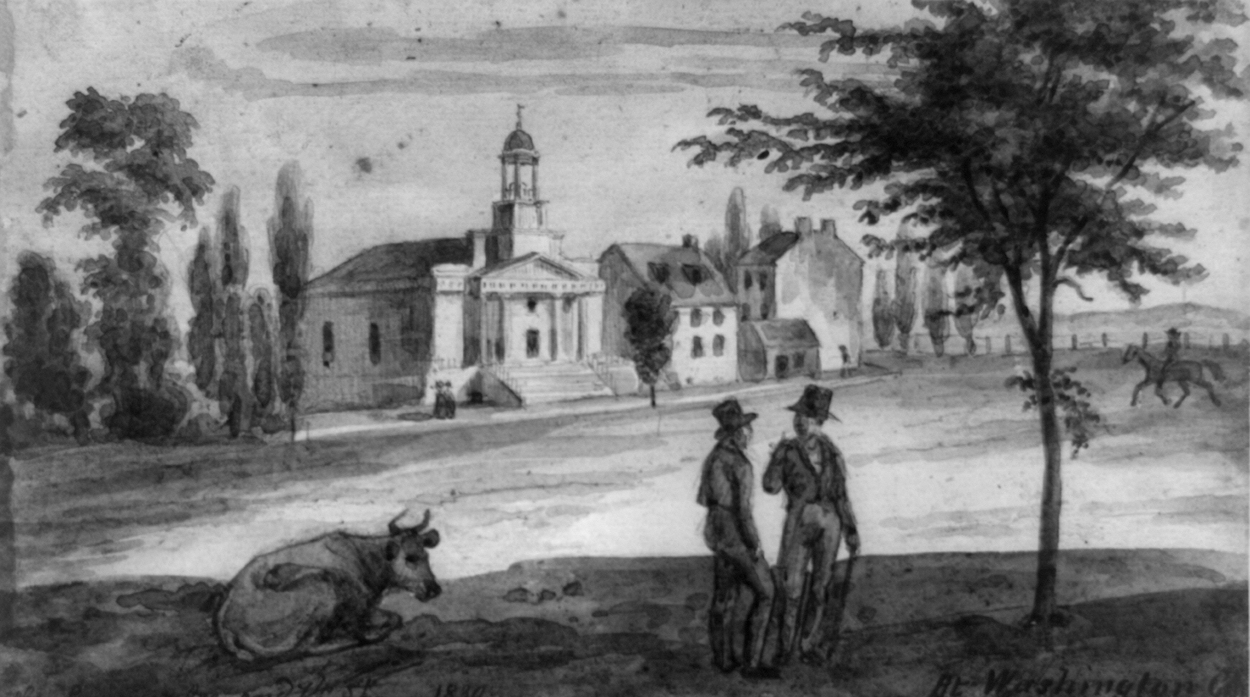
The original building, designed by Charles Bulfinch, located at what is now the intersection of 6th and D Streets Northwest. Pennsylvania Avenue runs in the foreground.

All Souls Church, Unitarian is a Unitarian Universalist church located at 1500 Harvard Street NW at the intersection of 16th Street, Washington, D.C., roughly where the Mt. Pleasant, Columbia Heights, and Adams Morgan neighborhoods of the city meet. The design of its current building, completed in 1924, is based on St Martin-in-the-Fields in London, England. It was listed on the National Register of Historic Places in 2020. All Souls, a member of the Unitarian Universalist Association of Congregations, describes its theology as having evolved from a liberal Christian tradition into a "rich pluralism."

== History ==
=== Nineteenth century ===
All Souls was founded in 1821 as the First Unitarian Church of Washington; among the church's founding members were President John Quincy Adams, Vice President John C. Calhoun, and Charles Bulfinch (who designed the original church building at 6th and D Streets NW and more famously the United States Capitol). The All Souls bell was cast in 1822 by Joseph Revere, the son of Paul; this bell, paid for with contributions by, among others, President James Monroe, originally served as a quasi-official town bell for Washington, DC.

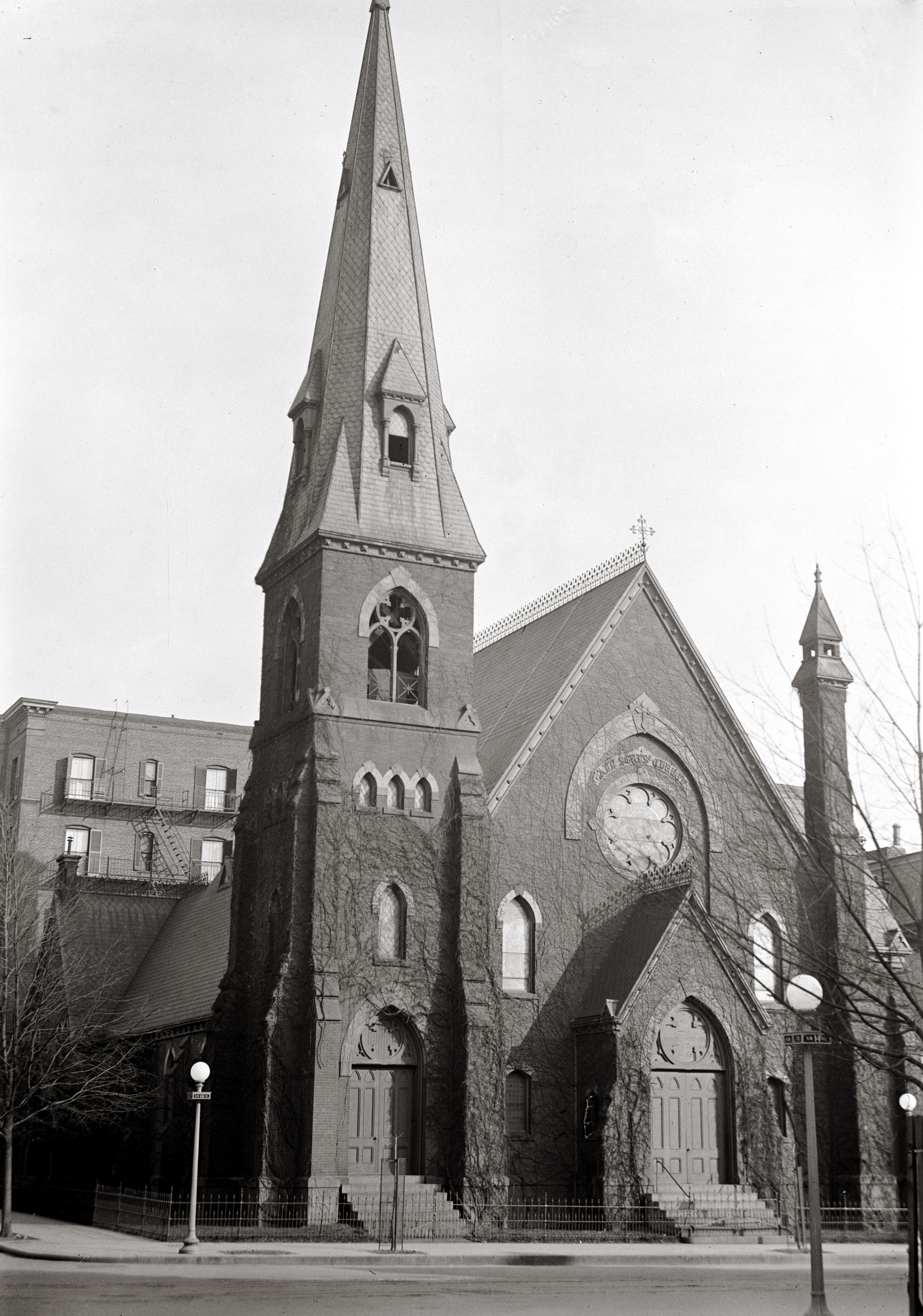
Former All Souls Church building in downtown Washington, D.C., c. 1916

The church has a long tradition of promoting liberal religious views and social justice issues. In the first half of the 19th century, it was known for its opposition to slavery, and counts among its past ministers the prominent abolitionist William Henry Channing.

William Henry Channing gave a sermon on the morning of February 8, 1863 at the Unitarian Church, which was still located on the corner of 6th and D Streets Northwest. Later that evening abolitionist and women's rights activist John Celivergos Zachos gave a prominent sermon to the Freedman of the Southern States. The subject was entitled "The Unity of the Human Race" with a special reference to the Freedman of South Carolina.

In 1877, the congregation changed its name to All Souls Church, a reflection of the words of William Ellery Channing, founding father of Unitarian Universalism (and uncle of Willam Henry Channing): "I am a member of the living family of all souls."

=== Twentieth century ===
In 1944, All Souls called A. Powell Davies to be its minister. Davies became nationally prominent for his progressive views, advocating civil rights for African-Americans and women, desegregation, and for keeping control of nuclear weapons in civilian hands. It was during Davies' tenure that All Souls organized a large shipment of school supplies for the children survivors of the nuclear attacks on Hiroshima and Nagasaki. During this period, All Souls also founded the first desegregated boys' club in the city, in response to the Police Boys' Club's reluctance to desegregate. Davies' popular ministry caused explosive growth both at All Souls and also in the formation of new Unitarian churches in the Washington, D.C. area, starting with the Unitarian Church of Arlington and followed closely by the Mount Vernon Unitarian Church and the Unitarian Universalist Congregation of Fairfax.

James Reeb, a martyr of the Civil Rights Movement, was Assistant Minister at All Souls prior to his murder at Selma, Alabama in 1965. All Souls' progressive vision continued through the 1970s and 1980s as well, under the Rev. David Hilliard Eaton, the church's first African-American senior minister. Documents obtained through the Freedom of Information Act revealed that J. Edgar Hoover was so deeply distrustful of the direction in which Eaton was leading All Souls that he planted an undercover FBI agent in the church to monitor the congregation and undermine Eaton's ministry.

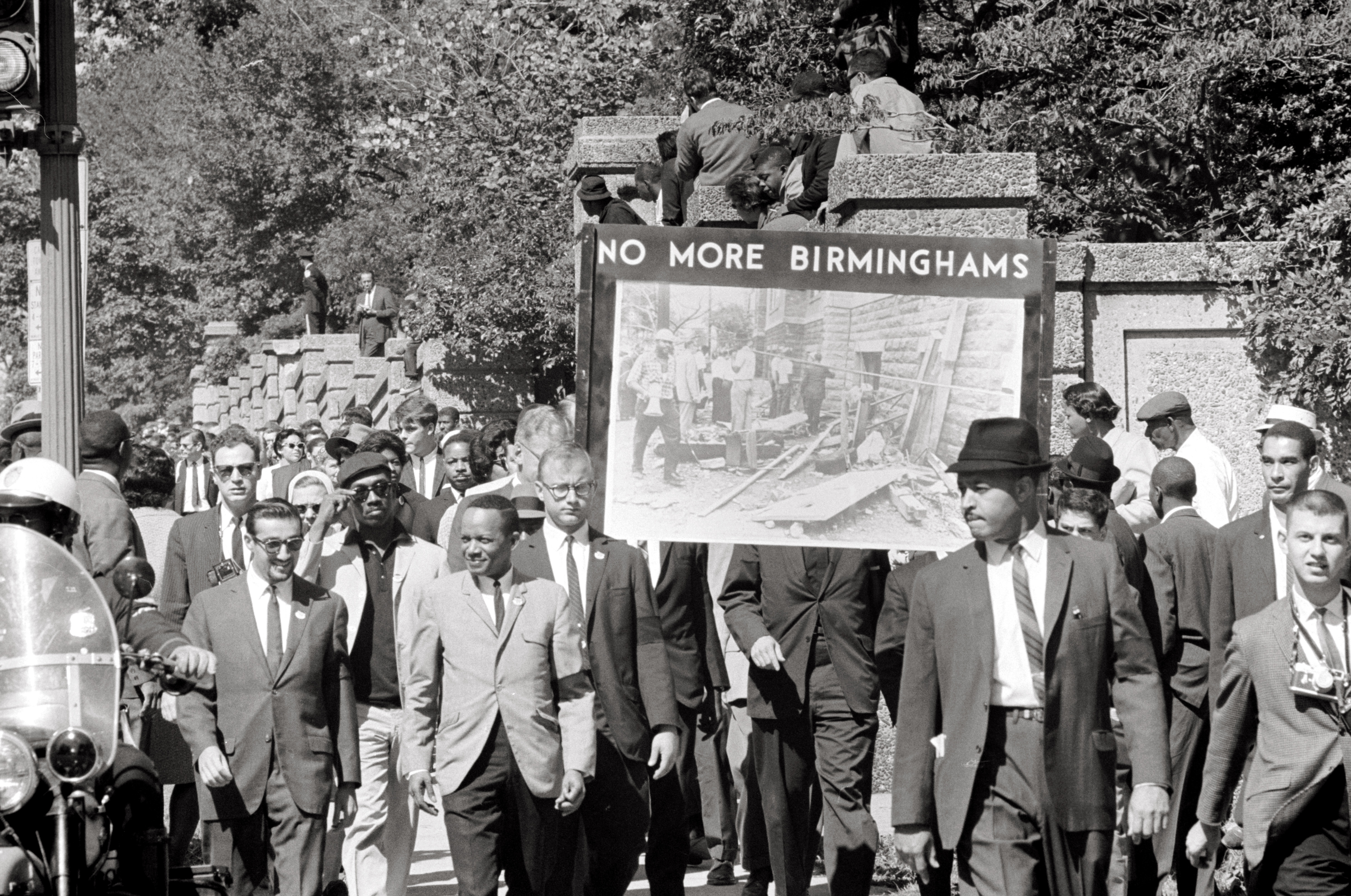
Members of All Souls Church, Unitarian marching in memory of the 16th Street Baptist Church bombing victims. September 1963.

All Souls has been performing interracial and same-sex weddings for decades.

=== New millennium ===
On the evening of September 11, 2001, All Souls and its newly called senior minister, Robert M. Hardies, held a memorial service which was covered by National Public Radio. Soon thereafter, All Souls hosted a public memorial service for Joseph Curseen Jr. and Thomas Morris Jr., two local postal workers who died from anthrax exposure. It was recently the site of a large conference of religious liberals and progressives, and on June 5, 2006, Rev. Hardies was shown speaking against the Federal Marriage Amendment in a clip from a National Press Club news conference on CNN's The Situation Room. On December 18, 2009 at All Souls Church, mayor Adrian Fenty signed into law the "Religious Freedom and Civil Marriage Equality Amendment Act of 2009", which made same-sex marriage legal in Washington, D.C. Rev. Hardies resigned from All Souls in June 2020. All Souls then hired an Interim Senior Minister for two years, the Rev. Kathleen Rolenz, who was the first female senior Minister of the church. The church then brought on the Rev. Bill Sinkford to continue the transitional work needed to prepare for a new called Senior Minister.

== Engagement ==
=== Music ===
All Souls has two primary choirs: The All Souls Choir, and the Jubilee Singers.

The Charlie Byrd and Stan Getz album Jazz Samba was recorded on 13 February 1962 in Pierce Hall at All Souls.

The punk bands Black Flag, Meat Puppets, Government Issue, and Nig-Heist performed in Pierce Hall on April 6, 1984. According to Mark Andersen and Mark Jenkins' history of punk in Washington, D.C., Dance of Days, the concert was "marred by fighting and the destruction of the bathrooms." Black Flag vocalist Henry Rollins was critical of the fan behavior at the concert, later remarking ruefully that "All Souls had this beautiful marble bathroom—it took some breaking!" Despite this, in a contemporary review of the concert, The Washington Post's Howard Wuelfing labeled the concert "nothing short of astonishing," noting that Black Flag performed to "a wildly appreciative house" and that Rollins "was greeted with tumultuous applause when he loped on stage."

Several notable bands from the Washington, D.C. punk community performed in concert at All Souls, such as Fugazi, Jawbox, Shudder to Think, Nation of Ulysses, Fidelity Jones, and Swiz.

=== Social justice ===
Civil rights activist Lillian Smith delivered "The Mob and the Ghost" on September 2, 1961.

Activist Angela Davis spoke at All Souls in 1974.

== Members ==
Prominent members of All Souls have included President and Chief Justice William Howard Taft, Associate Justice Wiley B. Rutledge, the Hon. Hilda Mason, former D.C. mayor Marion Barry, mezzosoprano Denyce Graves, and Sweet Honey in the Rock member Ysaye Maria Barnwell.
