= Robin Tanner (minister) =

American Unitarian Universalist minister

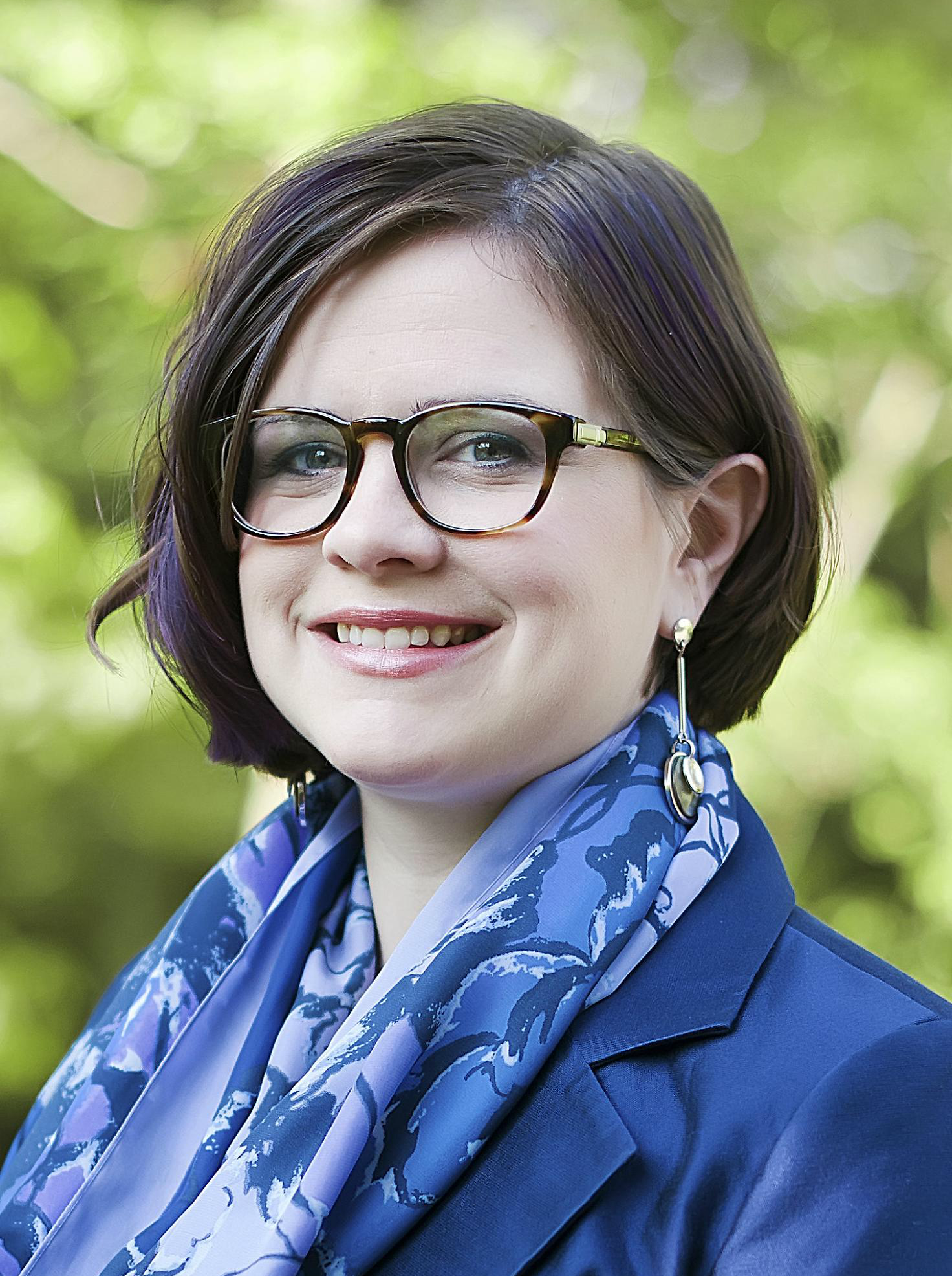
- Robin Tanner

Personal details
- Denomination: Unitarian Universalism
- Occupation: Minister
- Education: Rochester BA 2006; Harvard Divinity MA 2009; Pacific School of Religion PhD (2017 pending)

Robin Noelle Tanner is an American Unitarian Universalist minister notable for her activism for the causes of religious freedom and civil rights.

== Life and career ==
Tanner is the Minister of Worship and Outreach at Beacon Unitarian Universalist Congregation in Summit. From 2010 to 2016, she was lead minister at the Piedmont Unitarian Universalist Church in Charlotte and Salisbury in North Carolina. Tanner is a lesbian who married her partner in 2014 and has performed marriage services for same-sex couples.

In January 2017, she began serving as the Minister of Worship and Outreach at the Beacon Unitarian Universalist Congregation in Summit, New Jersey.

== Activism ==
In 2014, Tanner joined the United Church of Christ in an innovative lawsuit challenging prohibitions against marrying same-sex couples. This lawsuit took the novel position that the laws restricted the ministers' freedom of religion. The suit was successful: On October 10, 2014, the federal district court for western North Carolina struck down the ban on same-sex marriage. Tanner also worked to overturn HB2 (more formally the Public Facilities Privacy & Security Act), the North Carolina law that was passed in March 2016 to ban individuals from using a public bathroom that does not match the person's biological sex. The law also prevented cities from passing rules to protect gay and transgender people from discrimination.

She is an advocate for equal opportunity, voting rights for Latino and African-Americans, raising the minimum wage, marriage equality, as well as other issues.

In July 2017, she was arrested while protesting outside the office of senator Mitch McConnell, as part of an effort of "moral obedience" or civil disobedience, to espouse the cause of health care being a fundamental human right. In July 2017, Tanner protested the GOP healthcare plan to repeal the Affordable Care Act by bringing a coffin to the offices of congressional leaders, and was arrested for her civil disobedience.

Tanner has also been involved in activism related to immigration legislation and ICE. In 2019, she joined a Moral Monday event in El Paso, Texas, which criticized alleged mistreatment of detainees at an ICE processing center in the city. In May 2025, Tanner and other clergy members participated in anti-ICE protests at Delaney Hall ICE Detention Center in Newark, New Jersey. In January 2026, she signed an open letter calling for New Jersey Governor Phil Murphy to sign immigrant protections into law.
