= Maria Cook =

American Universalist preacher

Personal life
- Born: 1779
- Died: December 21, 1835 (aged 55–56) Geneva, New York

Religious life
- Religion: Christianity
- School: Christian universalism

Maria Cook (1779 – December 21, 1835) was the first woman to be recognized as a Universalist preacher.

== Biography ==
Maria Cook likely grew up around the Geneva, New York area, although details of her early life are hard to come by. She was born during the American Revolution, and was attracted to Christian universalism because of the belief that everyone would go to heaven eventually, rather than some people being sent eternally to hell. Cook's father died before she was thirty, and she inherited some of his wealth. She felt called to be a preacher, and although her family disapproved they did not try to stop her. She talked with everyone she could about Universalism, and she had begun holding small Universalist gatherings in Sheshequin, Pennsylvania by at least 1810, as is recorded by Nathaniel Stacy, a Universalist missionary, and she was asked to preach before the Western Association of Universalists in Bainbridge, New York the following year. The invitation aroused notable controversy however, as many did not believe a woman should be preaching; however there was so much curiosity and interest in hearing a woman preacher, the objections were finally withdrawn. Afterwards she was sent a letter of fellowship by the Association, but her experience with some of its members led her to believe the letter was not unanimous or sincere, and she destroyed it.

Over the next year she preached around the state of New York. Cook gathered larger crowds, and many people went to hear her only out of curiosity. She was apparently very talented however, and managed to persuade a large number to convert to Universalism; and offerings at the meetings made her the highest paid itinerant preacher in New York. Cook still encountered significant resistance however, including from other Universalist preachers, and even other women. She began spending more and more of her time preaching on defending her right as a woman to be a preacher, and as a result many felt her preaching became less interesting and her popularity declined. She went on another tour of preaching in New York in 1813, but was less successful than the first time, and moved in with friends in Otsego, New York.

She still aroused controversy though, and an anonymous complaint led her to being arrested, officially under the charge of vagrancy. However, she had been staying with friends at the time, and therefore was not homeless as the charges stated. Her friends and family pledged to continue supporting her in addition to her inherited wealth, but she was forcibly taken to the nearby Cooperstown, New York. Although she did not resist arrest, she also refused to cooperate; she needed to be carried to and from the police wagon, told the judge she did not recognize his authority, and refused to answer his questions. She was subsequently put in jail for contempt of court. In prison she preached to the other prisoners, and was released after a few weeks.

After her arrest, she retired from preaching in 1814 to live with her family. She considered starting a socialist utopian community inspired by the Shakers, making a number of attempts, but was ultimately unsuccessful. In the 1830s she again tried preaching, but illness forced her to retire again. Cook died in Geneva on December 21, 1835.
