= Abner Kneeland =

American evangelist and theologian

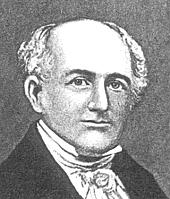
- Born: April 7, 1774; Gardner, Massachusetts
- Died: August 27, 1844 (aged 70); Salubria, Iowa
- Occupations: Preacher, Theologian
- Spouse: Four wives (First three widowed)
- Children: 12
- Parent(s): Timothy Kneeland, Martha Stone Kneeland

Abner Kneeland (April 7, 1774 – August 27, 1844) was an American evangelist and theologian who advocated views on women's rights, racial equality, and religious skepticism that were radical for his day. As a young man, Kneeland was a lay preacher in a Baptist church, but he converted to Universalism and was ordained as a minister. Later in life, he rejected revealed religion and Universalism's Christian God. Due to provocative statements he published, Massachusetts convicted Kneeland under its rarely used blasphemy law. Kneeland was the last man in the United States jailed for blasphemy. After his sentence, he founded a utopian society in Iowa, but it failed shortly after his death.

== Biography ==
=== Early life and ministry ===
Kneeland was born in Gardner, Massachusetts. At the age of 21, he attended a Baptist church and served as a lay preacher for a time. However, he soon converted to Universalism where he was ordained a minister. He served as minister of various churches for a time, helping organize hymnals and making his own translation of the New Testament. He also debated with other public theologians of the day. As time went on, he became more and more skeptical of revealed religion, causing schisms in the churches he administered. Eventually, he and the Universalist Church parted ways after his views became too far removed from Christianity. Kneeland became a freethinker and pantheist, saying that the Universalist's Christian God was "nothing more than a chimera of their own imagination".

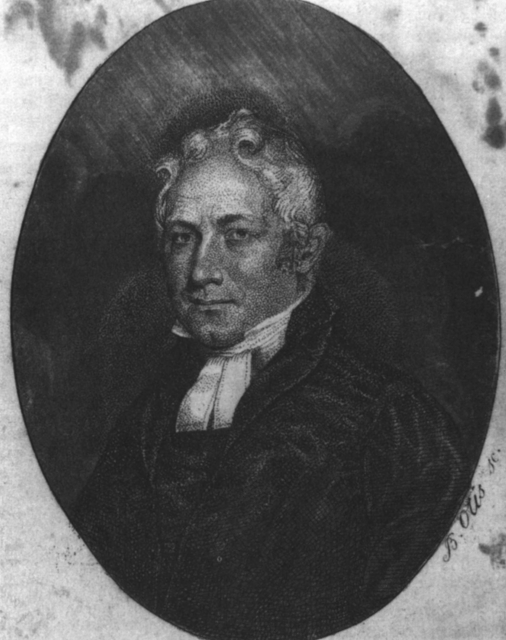
Portrait of Kneeland, 19th century (New York Historical Society)

=== Publishing ===
He edited a Universalist magazine in Philadelphia 1821–1823; he managed and edited the Olive Branch and Christian Enquirer in New York City in 1828; and he founded the Boston Investigator, an organ of free thought, in Boston in 1832.

=== Prosecution for blasphemy ===
Under the colonial charter of Massachusetts, blasphemy was still a crime, albeit one punished extremely rarely. However, perhaps because his other views inflamed the judiciary, Kneeland was charged with having violated the law. The final trial was held in 1838, five years after he had published the statements that caused the upset in the first place. Kneeland was convicted and served sixty days in prison. He was described by the judge as "a cantankerous and inflexible heretic".

=== Emigration and death ===
Kneeland left Massachusetts after the trial and moved to Iowa, where he started a small utopian community named Salubria (near present-day Farmington, Iowa). Salubria failed shortly after his death in 1844, and the main building was eventually converted into a chapel, with Sunday school classes taught by Kneeland's granddaughter.

== Religious and social views ==
In matters of religion, Kneeland became more and more disenchanted of religion handed down from some prophet and enshrined by tradition.

"But I certify you brethren, that the gospel which was preached of me is not after man. For I neither received it of man, neither was I taught it, but by the revelation Jesus Christ." Here is Paul, admitting after having preached a considerable number of years, that he knows nothing true of Jesus Christ, but that which Jesus Christ had revealed to himself; and expressly declaring that this revelation had been a mystery kept secret since the world began, and was only then first preached by himself. This declaration, were there nothing else, would be sufficient to destroy all idea of the four gospels being authentic.

Kneeland apud Henry Dodwell: We have at this day, certain most authentic ecclesiastical writers of the times, as Clemens Romanus, Barnabas, Hermas, Ignatius, and Polycarp, who wrote in the same order wherein I have named them, and after all the writers of the New Testament. But in Hermas you will not find one passage, or any mention of the New Testament, nor in all the rest is any one of the evangelists named. If sometimes they cite passages like those we read in our gospels, you will find them so changed, and for the most part so interpolated, that it cannot be known whether they produced them out of ours, or some apocryphal gospels. Nay, they sometimes cite passages which most certainly are not in our present gospels.

Kneeland disdained societal mores, preferring naturalistic and personal quests for truth. He believed in equal treatment for all people, both under the law as well as by society. Kneeland applied this even when religious scripture would seem to indicate different roles. This included support of such controversial ideas as divorce rights for women, married women keeping their own names and property, and refusal to condemn miscegenation (now known as interracial marriage). Kneeland was also in favor of birth control. He allowed fiery abolitionist William Lloyd Garrison the use of his lecture hall when the churches in Boston had turned him away.

== Works ==
- A Columbian Miscellany (Keene, New Hampshire, 1804)
- The Deist (New York, 1822)
- The New Testament in Greek and English (Philadelphia, 1822)
- Lectures on the Doctrine of Universal Salvation (1824)
- Lectures on Universal Benevolence (1824)
- A Review of the Evidences of Christianity (New York, 1829)
- An Introduction to the Defence of Abner Kneeland, Charged with Blasphemy (Boston, 1834)
