= William Henry McGlauflin =

American Universalist minister (1855–1927)

Rev. William Henry McGlauflin
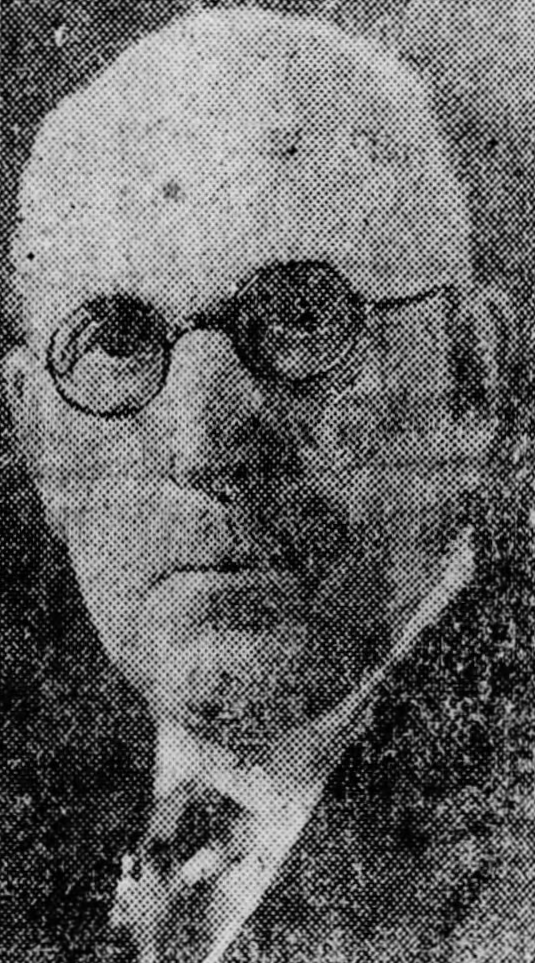
- Born: October 2, 1855; Charlotte, Maine
- Died: March 8, 1927 (aged 71); Scranton, Pennsylvania
- Burial place: Quincy, Massachusetts
- Education: St. Lawrence Theological School; American Temperance University
- Occupations: Universalist executive and parish minister
- Spouse(s): Lucy Culver McGlauflin (née Carter); Alice Gerturde McGlauflin (née Coe)
- Parent(s): Thomas McGlauflin and Alice McGlauflin (née McCabe)
- Religion: Universalist
- Church: Universalist Church of America
- Ordained: 1882
- Offices held: Parish Minister, Tri-State Superintendent, General Superintendent

William Henry McGlauflin (October 2, 1856 – March 8, 1927), better known as H. W. McGlauflin, was an American Universalist minister, missionary, and denominational leader.

McGlauflin served the Universalist cause for 45 years as a parish minister or as an executive in the administration of the Universalist denomination. He served pastorates across New York, Minnesota, Tennessee, Georgia, and Pennsylvania, becoming General Superintendent of the General Convention of Universalists, later known as the Universalist Church of America.

== Early and personal life ==
William Henry McGlauflin was born on October 2, 1856, in Charlotte, Maine. He was the sixth of eight children of Thomas McGlauflin (1822–1864) and Alice McCabe (1827–1878). His father, while serving in the Union Army during the American Civil War (1861–1865), died in 1864 at age 41 of illness in a Washington, D.C. hospital. His remains were interred in Arlington National Cemetery in Virginia. At the time of his father's death, McGlauflin was eight years old. There is no indication that his mother remarried, leaving her to raise McGlauflin and his siblings as a single mother on her Maine farm.

=== Education ===
McGlauflin received his primary education in the public school system in Maine. After his mother's death, McGlauflin was urged by Lewis B. Fisher, a neighbor and Universalist, to study at the Theological School of St. Lawrence University in Canton, New York (1881–1882). During his studies, McGlauflin received "wise counsel and close friendship" from Rev. I.M. Atwood. Years later, McGlauflin would succeed Atwood as the General Superintendent.

McGlauflin graduated with a Bachelor of Divinity (B.D.) degree. He also pursued advanced studies in biblical languages under Prof. William R. Harper from the University of Chicago.

On his official ministerial information card, McGlauflin listed "Chautauqua" in the education section. This reference is assumed to represent the Chautauqua Institution located in Chautauqua, a city in the southwest corner of New York State. McGlauflin's attendance from 1884 to 1885 overlaps with his circuit preaching in this same southwest corner of New York State.

While in Harriman, Tennessee, he attended American Temperance University (1894–1895) and earned an A.M. degree, now known as a Master of Arts. The university, opened in 1890, offered a wide range of courses from law, music, arts, and elocution. McGlauflin's wife, Lucy McGlauflin, a graduate of Cornell University in New York and the Emerson College of Oratory in Boston, MA, taught at the university.

In 1896, McGlauflin received an honorary Doctor of Divinity degree from the American Temperance University. He later received another honorary Doctor of Divinity degree from St. Lawrence Theological School.

=== Marriage and children ===
On September 26, 1887, McGlauflin, 31, married Lucy Culver Sibley (1857–1897) from Cuba, New York. Sibley died in Atlanta in 1897. Fifteen years later, in 1912, McGlauflin married Alice Gertrude Coe (1876–1964) from Quincy, Massachusetts. No children were born to McGlauflin in either of his marriages.

== Northwest New York State ==
Immediately after completing his studies at the St. Lawrence Theological School in 1882, McGlauflin began preaching in Madrid, just 10 miles from the school. Later, he took on a preaching circuit of small, nearby churches with 20 to 30 families each.

McGlauflin's New York State Circuit

== Southwest New York State ==
McGlauflin later moved to the southwest corner of New York State. There, his preaching circuit consisted of the small towns of Friendship, Whitesville (now known as Independence), Cuba, and Greenwood. In many accounts of McGlauflin's life, only Friendship is noted, which ordained him in September 1882.

While on this circuit, McGlauflin met his first wife, Lucy Culver Sibley, from Cuba.

McGlauflin attended the 1883 New York State Convention in Buffalo, where he presented a report entitled "Reform," calling for ministers to have "greater love for the denominational laws." Specifically, McGlauflin called for fidelity to the denomination's temperance position. He decried ministers who used tobacco, claiming that the "confirmed smokers were fit subjects for salvation and capable of higher things." He also argued that ministers should use water rather than wine in their communion service. McGlauflin, then one year into his ministerial career, faced criticism for his outspoken support, which some considered naive.

McGlauflin's time to be a paragon of the temperance movement would need to wait several years until his pastorate in Harriman, Tennessee, a town described by Walter T. Pulliam in his 1978 book, Harriman: The Town Temperance Built.

== Rochester, Minnesota ==
McGlauflin's first full-time ministry began in June 1887 at the Grace Universalist Church in Rochester, Minnesota. When McGlauflin assumed the pastorate, the church founded in the 1860s, was already well-established. It had a membership of 80 families, more than twice the size of the churches he had previously ministered.

McGlauflin's ministry at Grace Universalist (now known as the First Unitarian Universalist Church) was unremarkable. That is not to say his ministry was unsuccessful. During his four-year ministry, the church building underwent a renovation, and social and fellowship events were frequently held. Most importantly, membership increased to 100 families.

McGlauflin's pastorate ended in August 1891. In his resignation announcement, the local newspaper reported that McGlauflin "is very popular and efficient in his labors and everyone will regret his departure."

McGlauflin's decision to leave Rochester was proceeded by a two-week visit in December 1890 to Harriman, Tennessee. This visit also marked the beginning of McGlauflin's multi-year relationship with the Young People's Christian Union.

== General Missionary of the Y.P.C.U. ==
The Young People's Christian Union (Y.P.C.U.) was formed in 1889 to organize the youth of the Universalist denomination. Wishing to be "useful in the service of God," the organization focused on missionary activities to establish new Universalist societies. At its first convention in Rochester, New York, among other actions, McGlauflin was appointed the youth group's first missionary.

McGlauflin's ministry career remained linked with the Y.P.C.U. for the next 14 years.

== Harriman, Tennessee ==
The Y.P.C.U.'s first missionary project was Harriman, Tennessee. At that time, the East Tennessee Land Company was purchasing large tracts of land to exploit the nearby abundant resources of coal, iron, and timber, and planned to develop a town.

=== The Town Temperance Built ===
Rev. Henry Lowell Canfield (1828–1926), State Superintendent of Churches and Sunday Schools of Ohio, and Rev. Charles Ellwood Nash (1855–1932), then pastor of the Universalist Church in Akron, Ohio, encouraged the Harriman missionary project. They argued that in Harriman, the Universalists would be the religious vanguard in a burgeoning new city, rather than trailing along as latecomers. Two other factors made Harriman a desirable location for a new Universalist church.

First, the town's organization was under the guidance of Frederick Gates, a New York-born Baptist minister and prohibition advocate. Gates, with others, chartered the East Tennessee Land Company with the intention of creating a town that would avoid the vice-driven pitfalls characteristic of many fast-growing company towns. Gates said of Harriman

Its foundations (referring to Harriman) were well-laid and the whole state of Tennessee has since honored its youngest city by following its lead and banishing the saloon. Upon that principle, Harriman was founded by Prohibition; she stands or falls, but she will not fall!"

This embrace of temperance perfectly aligned with the Y.P.C.U.'s temperance position.

The second, and more importantly to the Y.P.C.U.'s missionary objective, was financial support extended by several parties. The East Tennessee Land Company donated two choice lots of land, totaling 100 by 380 feet. Ferdinand Schumacher of Akron, Ohio, a Universalist, a wealthy German immigrant known as the "oatmeal king" and a temperance advocate, pledged $1,000 to the church building fund if the Universalists raised $4,000. Additionally, pledges were raised from the citizens of Harriman ($555) and from the directors of the East Tennessee Land Company ($445). Given these factors, Y.P.C.U. moved forward with plans to construct a church in Harriman, at a cost not exceeding $5,000.

=== Ministry in Harriman ===
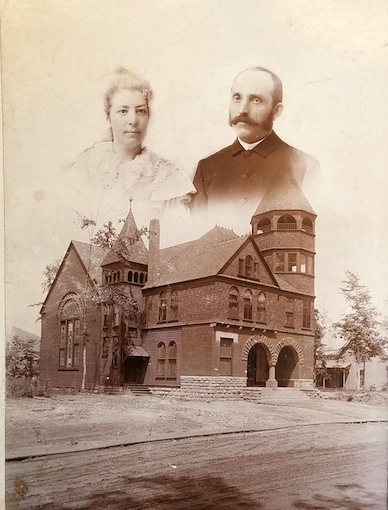
Rev. McGlauflin and Wife Grace Universalist Church

By the next Y.P.C.U.'s convention in 1891, sufficient funds to erect a new church and pay the minister's first year's salary had been secured. The Y.P.C.U. executive board arranged for McGlauflin to resign his pastorate in Rochester and move to Harriman. McGlauflin preached his first sermon in Harriman on August 30, 1891. The newly formed building committee, however, envisioned a better and larger church and raised additional funds.

The cornerstone for the Grace Universalist Church was laid on December 2, 1891. The new church building at 615 Cumberland Street was then erected at an estimated cost between $8,500 and $10,000. The church included a sanctuary, a parish house for the minister, halls, parlors, a library, dining facilities, and reception rooms. The building was formally dedicated on Easter Sunday, April 17, 1892. Rev. Henry L. Canfield, who had initially raised the idea of a church in Harriman, preached the dedication sermon.

McGlauflin was formally welcomed as the new minister nine months later, on January 30, 1892. The church by this time had organized a local chapter of the Young People's Christian Union, a Junior Union for younger children, a Sunday School with 85 students, and a Women's Missionary Alliance. A year and a half later, in July 1893, the number of adult church members had risen to 70. In 1895, the debt-free church had 140 members.

=== Y.P.C.U. Southern Missionary ===
With the Harriman church firmly established, the Y.P.C.U. expanded McGlauflin's duties and appointed him as its Southern Missionary in the summer of 1894. He also retained his ministry of the Harriman church. His missionary preaching circuit included the Tennessee towns of Knoxville, Crossville, Pomona (a nearby community), Chattanooga, and Shelbyville. The Harriman church was instrumental in raising funds for the Knoxville church.

McGlauflin shared his missionary work with Rev. Quillen H. Shinn. Shinn, a long-time missionary, also had a professional connection with the Y.P.C.U. In 1893, Shinn was appointed as the group's National Organizer and Chairman of its Post Office Mission. Two years later, in January 1895, the Board of Trustees of the General Convention appointed Shinn as the denomination's General Missionary. (Note: the Y.P.C.U., although subordinate to the General Convention, often operated as a separate, independent group regarding missionary endeavors.)

=== Departure from Harriman ===
In 1895, the Young People's Christian Union declared its missionary work in Harriman completed. McGlauflin would now be deployed to a new Y.P.C.U. project.

McGlauflin recruited Rev. Harry L. Veazey to fill his vacated pulpit. Veazey was something of a "native son" of Harriman. He had come to Harriman with his father, Arthur Veazey, a contractor and builder, to assist in building the city. The younger Veazey joined the Universalist church. McGlauflin then successfully encouraged Veazey to join the Universalist ministry. In September 1896, Veazey was installed as the minister for the Harriman and Knoxville churches.

== Atlanta, Georgia ==
The November 8, 1895, issue of Onward, the Y.P.C.U. magazine, ran a front-page article declaring that an irrevocable action had been taken, paraphrasing Julius Caesar in his 49 B.C. Italian campaign saying,

On to Atlanta! The ground is broken at Atlanta, Ga. The die is cast. The Rubicon crossed. We have put our hand to the plough, there is no turning back now. . . Let us not loiter away the day of grace. Harriman number one is ours; let us get right after Harriman number two. ON TO ATLANTA!

Two years earlier, in 1893, Shinn had begun missionary work in Atlanta. Shinn resumed preaching in Atlanta in February 1895, declaring that he had organized a Universalist church with 26 members.

=== First Universalist Church of Atlanta ===
Shinn's missionary work was the second attempt to establish a Universalist presence in Atlanta. Fourteen years earlier, in 1879, Rev. W.C. Bowman, an itinerant preacher from North Carolina, came to Atlanta and established a Universalist society. Rev. John C. Burruss, editor of the Universalist Herald, recommended Bowman to the leadership of the Universalist General Convention as a Southern missionary. The General Convention endorsed this recommendation and financially supported Bowman's missionary work in Atlanta. The 1880 issue of the Universalist Register reported a membership of 11 families.

Rev. D.B. Clayton, a South Carolina itinerant Universalist minister, moved to Atlanta in 1880 to assist Bowman with his church and the publication of Bowman's newly founded Atlanta Universalist newspaper. Both endeavors failed, and both Bowman and Clayton departed the city.

With the collapse of their Universalist society, some members of Bowman's church found refuge with Atlanta's Unitarians, in the Church of Our Father, established by Rev. George Leonard Chaney in 1883.

=== Second Universalist Church of Atlanta ===
While still the minister of Harriman, McGlauflin began preaching in Atlanta in September 1895. His initial sermon topics included "The Faith of the Universalist Church" and "The Work of the Universalist Church."

After visiting Atlanta for several weeks, the Atlanta church formally called McGlauflin as their pastor in January 1896. However, due to commitments in Harriman, McGlauflin did not resign his pastorate at Harriman until May 1896. He then moved to Atlanta. McGlauflin's eight-year Atlanta ministry by all measures was successful.

After four years of preaching in rental spaces, the cornerstone for the First Universalist Church of Atlanta was laid in April 1900. The laying of the cornerstone was accompanied by grand festivities with a local orchestra leading the attendees in song. McGlauflin's dedication sermon aptly summarized the mission of this new Young People's Christian Union sponsored church.

Its mission is to preach the complete gospel of Christ; to train childhood in the love of God and not the fear of hell; to quicken youth in united Christian service; to win souls now lost in ignorance and sin to the "better way;" to comfort those who mourn; to sweeten, strengthen and enlarge human life; to practically illustrate the spirit of brotherhood evinced when we who are strong bear the infirmities of the weak, in the attainment of "sound minds and sound bodies."

Three months after the cornerstone was laid at 16 Harris Street, the church was dedicated. The Y.P.C.U.'s national convention coincided with the church's dedication. Also in attendance were Rev. Thomas Chapman, Georgia's State Missionary, Rev. John Burruss, recently the editor of the Universalist Herald, and Rev. D.B. Clayton, who had played a role a decade earlier in the formation of Atlanta's first Universalist church.

The Atlanta church identified more with the Young People's Christian Union than with the national General Convention of Universalists, with church members frequently referring to themselves as Unioners.

As with his other pastoral roles, McGlauflin settled into the daily duties of a church minister, delivering sermons, managing the church's Young People's Christian Union, and the women's Mission Circle. He attended the national conventions of the Y.P.C.U. and the General Convention of Universalists, as well as the Georgia State Convention meetings. McGlauflin also continually added to the church's membership role. In his farewell comments, McGlauflin noted that during his ministry, more than 200 people had been added.

Unfortunately, early in his Atlanta pastorate, his wife of ten years, Lucy Culver Sibley, died in 1897. The death of his wife was widely covered in the local newspapers and Y.P.C.U. magazine Onward. McGlauflin remained unmarried for the next 15 years until marrying Alice Gertude Coe in 1912.

=== Departure from Atlanta ===
At a church board meeting in October 1903, McGlauflin officially announced his intention to depart Atlanta and assume the role of the State Superintendent for the tri-state area of Iowa, Minnesota, and Wisconsin. The Board reluctantly accepted his resignation. He departed Atlanta in February 1904.

== Tri-State Superintendent ==
The Universalist denomination had long relied upon state conventions as an organizing principle. Local churches deemed their state conventions far more important in managing their affairs than the national General Convention of Universalists.

However, state conventions, run by unpaid volunteers, were not efficient in conducting the affairs of the Universalist church. These affairs included ordaining and disciplining ministers, resolving conflicts, raising funds, initiating missionary efforts, maintaining records, and coordinating communication among churches. McGlauflin's appointment as a full-time paid state superintendent was to address these shortcomings and help foster a greater identification within local parishes with the larger denomination.

None of the states in his new tri-superintendency, also known as the Northwest Superintendency, had a state superintendent. McGlauflin held this position until 1907, earning a salary of $1,200, which the General Convention of Universalists paid.

=== Objectives of Tri-State Superintendency ===
McGlauflin began his new position with a personal touch, visiting his old pastorate, Grace Universalist Church, in Rochester, Minnesota. Seventeen years earlier, McGlauflin began his first full-time pastorate at this church. His sermon to his old church was "Forgetting the Things That are Behind, I Press Forward." One congregant described the experience, saying

He is one of the most happy speakers I ever heard. He seems to know exactly what to say and how to say it. It seemed as though Mr. McGlauflin was speaking personally to every person in the audience.

McGlauflin selected Minneapolis as his headquarters. He began his work in earnest at a March 1904 conference held in that city. Reflecting the importance of this new position, attendees included Rev. I.M. Atwood, the denomination's General Superintendent, Rev. Charles E. Nash, president of the Universalist Lombard College and the Field Secretary of the General Convention, as well as ministers from Iowa, Minnesota, and Wisconsin.

Tasks on McGlauflin's agenda included establishing an accurate accounting of the church's presence in the states, reviving dormant churches, renewing the spirit of existing churches through revival tours, and editing the Tri-State Messenger, a multi-state newsletter. Rev. Charles E. Nash summarized the general situation within the churches, saying, "To cease croaking and look forward to better things."

=== Accurate Accounting of Church Presence ===
The accuracy of local data, such as whether churches were active, their church membership, and Sunday School attendance, was long deemed suspect. For example, the official denominational statistics recorded in the Universalist Register for the tri-state area for 1903, the year before McGlauflin's Superintendency, showed that there were 59 churches with a total membership of 3,546. However, many statistical records were marked as "no recent information available." Of the 59 churches, 35% were recorded as dormant.

=== Dormant Churches and Revival Tours ===
McGlauflin took a personal approach to returning dormant churches to an active status by providing occasional preaching services. Under McGlauflin's superintendency, a half-dozen churches were returned to active status. Another objective of McGaulfin's Superintendency was to uplift the spirit and activism of the tri-state Universalists. To this end, he conducted a number of evangelical revivalist tours.

Unlike orthodox evangelical revival meetings, marked by fiery sermons, wild gyrations, and spontaneous conversions to Christ, Universalist revivals were focused on revitalizing the faith within existing congregations. Rev. Charles E. Nash, as the Field Secretary of the General Convention, noted that

What we need is a true conception of the beauties of God's love for us and a faith in his infinite mercy. This will grant that peace and comfort to our souls which it was ever intended that we possess.

McGlauflin's revival meetings combined uplifting encouragement for current Universalists with teachings to a broader audience about Universalism. Revival sermons covered topics such as "The Universal Fatherhood of God," "The Authority and Leadership of Jesus Christ," "The Bible Containing a Revelation from God," "The Certainty of Just Retribution of Sin," and "The Final Harmony of all Souls with God."

McGlauflin initiated his revival tours with a week-long series of sermons at the then-dormant St. John Church in Oshkosh that had closed its doors two years earlier. McGlauflin made and then latter fulfilled his promise to provide preaching services to this church until a permanent minister had been installed. At the conclusion of this revival meeting, St. John's Church accepted 14 new members and baptized five children. In Waterloo, Iowa, the local papers reported on the conclusion of McGlauflin's March 1905, 12-day revival tour in reporting "Larger Crowds Listen to Dr. McGlauflin." In his closing sermon, McGlauflin spoke about the Universalist teaching on the just retribution of sin and the final harmony of all souls.

"Sin does not go unpunished," said McGlauflin, mollifying criticism often leveled from the orthodox Christians that Universalists allowed those who offended God to go unpunished. McGlauflin emphasized that the "consequence of sin is both certain and severe." Punishment, he observed, occurred in the shame of a sinful life in the "visible" world and an experience of the soul in the "invisible."

McGlauflin then provided a Universalist perspective on "How long will the punishment last?" McGlauflin stated, "God punishes on the principle of parsimony. He gives as little as necessary to accomplish the results—obedience, penitence, reformation." McGlauflin concluded his sermon, reflecting a gradual shift in Universalist theology from simply "all are saved" to a more humanist, service-based, world-centered-religion perspective.

And what were the sins for which Jesus proclaimed such severe retribution? Lying, stealing, adultery, covetousness, idolatry? None of these. The punishments were announced as coming upon those who had committed the sin of neglect, or apathy, of indifference and carelessness in the presence of need, of opportunity, when they possessed abundant ability.

=== End of Tri-State Superintendency ===
McGlauflin's effectiveness in meeting the challenges of his Tri-State Superintendency was recognized by denominational leadership. In early 1907, he was promoted to the most senior position within the denomination, the General Superintendent.

McGlauflin's superintendency was formally transferred to Rev. A.R. Tillinghast at the March 1907 Wisconsin State Convention. On the last day of the convention, McGlauflin preached a powerful sermon and then departed for his new assignment.

== General Superintendent Background ==
McGlauflin's work as a multi-state superintendent and the General Superintendent is best understood in the context of an ongoing evolution in the administrative structure of the Universalist denomination.

Denominational leadership acknowledged that to be a viable national religion, it needed to update its governing structure. The situation was summarized by Rev. Almon Gunnison, president of the St. Lawrence Theological School.

We have State Conventions, but they are not heartily supported; we have a General Convention, but its petitions are unheeded, and its policies are supported or neglected according to the mood or whim of those who tentatively recognize its authority.

This situation was discussed at a meeting of ministers at the 1898 General Convention. A consensus was reached that a system of supervision for pastors and parishes was needed to increase loyalty to the church. The ministers also sought a process that would assist unemployed ministers in securing a parish settlement. Their concern was passed on to the Board of Trustees of the General Convention. The Board responded by proposing a new position of General Superintendent.

The General Superintendent of the Universalist Church is to supervise the spiritual interest of our church, to promote its prosperity by using his influence to stimulate the zeal and activity of our people; to secure unity and continuity of action on the part of our parishes; to encourage weak parishes; to revive dormant parishes; to remove causes of dissatisfaction between pastors and parishes; to foster the appointment of state superintendents and district superintendents; to help pastors in their difficulties, and, so far as possible, to utilize all our ministerial forces, that our church may do its share of Christ's work in the world.

The position oversaw churches in the United States and Canada and faced long-standing opposition to denominational central control. Congregational polity, which guaranteed that churches were autonomous, self-governing entities, was a deeply held tradition. Consequently, the office of General Superintendent lacked any real administrative authority requiring the General Superintendent to use cajoling and personal influence to carry out the duties of the office.

Rev. Isaac Morgan Atwood, in 1898, was appointed the denomination's first General Superintendent. Six years later, citing the daunting nature of the position, he resigned. The General Convention Board of Trustees was so disheartened that it voted to eliminate the position. The elimination of the position was only thwarted by a vote at the General Convention. The position went unfilled until the appointment of McGlauflin.

== General Superintendent ==
Selecting Chicago, Illinois as his headquarters, McGlauflin began his duties as General Superintendent in March 1907. In many ways, his new office put the same demands on him in terms of travel, preaching, advocacy, and organizing as his state superintendent role. A summary of his activities at the end of his nine years as General Superintendent included the following.

He had traveled 238,700 miles, visited 40 states and provinces, delivered 1,366 sermons and addresses, participated in state conventions, attended national conventions for the Young People's Christian Union, Women's Missionary Association, and Sunday School Association. He regularly attended meetings at Universalist centers at Murray Grove, New Jersey and Ferry Beach, Maine. Commenting on these statistics, it was said that the "influence of Dr. McGlauflin cannot be measured by ecclesiastical mathematics."

=== Missionary Work ===
The denomination's missionary work was divided into two categories. The first was the Home Mission, which referred, at this time, to the Southern and Western states. The second was and Foreign Mission, which referred to the Mission to Japan. McGlauflin needed to address two perennial issues in the denomination's missionary work.

The first issue was the oversight management of missionary initiatives. Due to the historic lack of a strong central administration, it was common for independent groups to take the lead in conducting the denomination's missionary work. The Young People's Christian Union is an example of such a group. The same could be said of the National Women's Missionary Association and the Sunday School Association. However, given the embedded bureaucratic structures of these associations, McGlauflin did not attempt any significant realignment of authority.

He did experience one minor success after the death of Rev. Quillen Shinn in 1907. Although well-respected, especially in the South, Shinn worked independently of national leadership, which annoyed some. McGlauflin did not continue the office of the Southern Missionary; instead, he simply combined Shinn's southern missionary responsibilities into his own portfolio.

The Mission to Japan was another example of a missionary endeavor that emerged outside an administrative structure. At the 1886 General Convention, a general call was made that the Universalist Church should engage in a foreign mission. Such a call had great emotional appeal and was launched without any institutional planning.

The second perennial issue facing McGlauflin was funding. When McGlauflin assumed his new duties, the Mission to Japan, for example, had a $4,000 deficit requiring him to make an immediate appeal to churches for contributions.

Similar funding challenges impacted the Home Missions as well as the overall financing of the General Convention. Funding relied on a less-than-successful collection of funds from churches based on its Quota or apportionment system. Other funding sources included gifts and revenue from funds and investments.

Despite these obstacles, McGlauflin's management of the denomination's missionary work was considered successful. His General Superintendent role was sometimes referred to as "financial secretaryship." McGlauflin raised funds through gifts and appeals to support ministers' salaries, pay off church debt, repair churches, and fund the Mission to Japan.

=== West Coast Convention ===
McGlauflin also worked to push the denomination outside its East Coast – Midwest comfort zone. He proposed that the 1915 General Convention be held in Pasadena, California. First offered at the 1912 General Convention, many opposed his proposal and prophesied that a West Coast convention was a looming disaster.

McGlauflin countered his opponents, stating that the convention should not be seen simply as a single event, but rather as a "missionary pilgrimage." As the chair of the committee of arrangements, McGlauflin designed transportation plans that included visits to churches along the route, as well as opportunities for evangelism. Saying the event should be seen as a "Universalist crusade in the whole Pacific country."

The "Convention Special," comprising 300 people, paused for religious services in Chicago and then in Riverside, California. At the conclusion of the Convention, many traveled to the San Francisco Exposition to celebrate Universalist Day.

=== State Superintendency ===
Expanding the state superintendency program was another key goal for McGlauflin. He believed that State Superintendents brought local churches into closer contact with the national denominational structure and thus built denominational identity and loyalty.

When he began his tenure as General Superintendent in 1907, there were eight state superintendents. Funding for these superintendents varied widely: the Iowa, Minnesota, and Wisconsin tri-state superintendent received $2,000; California received $1,500; and Kansas received $1,000. Other superintendents in Alabama, Georgia, North Carolina, Texas, and Missouri received only modest funds, ranging from $50 to $600. By 1914, the last year for which specific data on state superintendents is available, there were 11 state superintendents.

McGlauflin not only increased the number of state superintendents, but he also helped to institutionalize the position. He organized the National Council of Superintendents, which was composed of the General Superintendent as president and state superintendents as members. Archival searches indicate that the Council of Superintendents remained active at least until 1949.

=== Shin Memorial ===
Shortly following the death of Rev. Quillen H. Shinn in September 1907, discussions emerged, especially within the Young People's Christian Union, to find a way to honor their fallen Southern Missionary. Based on a recommendation of McGlauflin, a resolution was passed at the 1911 General Convention, "to erect in some city of the South, a memorial church in honor of the late Q.H. Shinn, D.D., and trust the undertaking will be crowned with success."

McGlauflin initiated a nationwide fundraising program called the Memorial Association of the Southern States. The Board of Trustees initially declined to endorse McGlauflin's commitment to a national fundraising organization, but McGlauflin persuaded them to endorse the effort.

Four years later, in his General Superintendent's 1915 report, McGlauflin noted that pledges for the memorial church had reached $10,000 and that Chattanooga, Tennessee, had been selected as the location for the new church. McGlauflin also added that this effort was the first time the denomination as a whole engaged in building a church in recognition of a minister.

McGlauflin was the keynote speaker at the August 1916 dedication of the Shinn Memorial Church. McGlauflin's dedication sermon, "The Place of the Church in Modern Life," was an aptly titled sermon. The occasion paid tribute to a former missionary associated with a bygone era, yet presented Universalism as a religion relevant to an America of the 20th century.

=== Retires as General Superintendent ===
McGlauflin retired from denominational administrative duties in 1916 and returned to parish ministry. In April of that year, McGlauflin spent several weeks speaking at the pulpit at the John Raymond Memorial Universalist Church in Scranton, Pennsylvania. In June, the Scranton church extended a call to him. He accepted and officially began his pastorate on September 1, 1916.

== Scranton, Pennsylvania ==
Scranton's Universalists had been served by the All Souls' Universalist Church for decades. In 1906, with the dedication of a new church building, All Souls' changed its name to the John Raymond Memorial Universalist Church. The new church was named after John Brown Raymond (1795–1882), an early Pennsylvania railroad industrialist and former resident of Scranton. Mrs. Caleb Brewster Hackley (née Frances Antoinette Raymond), Raymond's daughter and a New York philanthropist, was granted naming rights due to her significant contribution to the church's construction. The church had a 300-seat capacity, space for Sunday school, a kitchen, a ladies' parlor, an infant room, and a pastor's study.

When McGlauflin spoke at the church in the Spring of 1916, the church's pulpit had just recently become vacant following the resignation of its minister of 14 years, Rev. Thomas Payne. Payne resigned amid controversy sparked by two incidents that occurred two years earlier and had now reached the point where a formal ouster petition had been filed. Those 1914 incidents included Payne permitting Spiritualist meetings to be held in the church and opening his pulpit to a speaker who "attacked the Bible." The background of this controversy provides context for the two topics covered in McGlauflin's first sermon to his new church on September 10, 1916.

This pulpit of the John Raymond Memorial will have many ministries. It will try to instruct and to entertain, to promote justice, sobriety, and peace. In quest of this, you must allow it to traverse all fields of human endeavor and human environment. It must be a free pulpit, free as the pews are free, to think, to speak, and to aspire for the higher attainment and satisfaction of life.

Having asserted his right to a free pulpit, his sermon text, based on the first four words from the book of Genesis, "In the Beginning, God," affirmed McGlauflin's solidarity with scriptural text. His sermon's rejection of "atheistic evolution" may have been a direct counterpoint to the assumed attack on the Bible two years earlier.

Following his formal installation in October 1916, McGlauflin, 60, settled again into the routine of parish ministry, which would last for ten years, delivering sermons, attending church meetings, and participating in various functions. His wife, Alice, also became a regular presence at church services and events, offering solo singing performances.

=== War Years ===
Starting with the entry of the United States into World War I (1914–1918) in April 1917, McGlauflin began delivering patriotic sermons. A sampling of his sermons includes such titles as "A Time for Christian Courage," "Mine Own Country," Whence Comes War," and "From Despotism to Democracy." He emphasized that "Love for one's country is a normal, healthful virtue."

At the war's end, McGlauflin offered comfort with his sermon entitled "Victories of Peace." Throughout McGlauflin's ministry, he continued to offer patriotic-themed sermons.

=== Scranton Ministerial Association and Unity Club ===
Earlier in his ministerial career, McGlauflin was twice denied ecumenical fellowship with fellow clerics claiming he lacked sufficient credentials for Christian fellowship because Universalists did not believe in the deity of Jesus.

Scranton's Protestant ministers harbored no such hostility toward McGlauflin. Soon after McGlauflin's arrival in Scranton, he joined the Scranton Ministerial Association. For several years beginning in 1918, he represented the Association at various events and meetings. He then became the Association's secretary in 1921. A year later, he became the vice president and then the president from 1924 to 1926.

McGlauflin was a member of the city's Unity Club. He was present at the Scranton Unity Club's organizational meeting in October 1923. The Unity Club, like the Ministerial Association, fostered interfaith dialogue and cooperation, but had an expanded membership to the city's Jewish rabbis. Religious professionals present at the club's organizational meeting included Rev. C.H. Rust from Immanuel Baptist Church, Rev. Howard W. Clark of First Christian Church, and Rabbi Bernard Heller of the Madison Avenue Temple. McGlauflin was elected president.

The formation of the city's Unity Club may have been suggested by McGlauflin. McGlauflin was a member and officer of Atlanta's Unity Club in Atlanta. At a farewell dinner given in McGlauflin's honor, members expressed regret over McGlauflin's departure.

=== Pennsylvania State Universalist Convention ===
Soon after moving to Scranton, McGlauflin became involved in the Pennsylvania State Convention of Universalists. In 1917, the Convention held its 86th annual meeting at his John Raymond Memorial Universalist Church. McGlauflin, as the hosting minister, provided a welcoming address and conducted the Sunday service.

McGlauflin was a regular attendee at this annual meeting, frequently offering an address. In 1921, he was acting chair of the resolution committee. In that position, he proposed two resolutions. One resolution called for the United States to take the lead in ongoing international disarmament discussions. The other resolution was a locally focused call for more effective enforcement of the prohibition-era Volstead Act, which banned the manufacturing and sale of alcoholic beverages.

From 1923 to 1926, McGlauflin served as the Convention's Vice-President. Afterwards, he served as a member of the Board of Trustees.

=== Illustrated Dramas ===
The rhythm of Sunday services at John Raymond Universalist Memorial Church was public worship at 10:30 a.m., Bible Class at Noon, the Young People's Christian Union meeting at 6:30 p.m., and an evening sermon or lecture at 7:30 p.m. Attendance at the evening service, however, was described as "meager." In late 1922, six years into his pastorate, McGlauflin addressed this attendance shortfall by a rather inventive reengineering of the evening service.

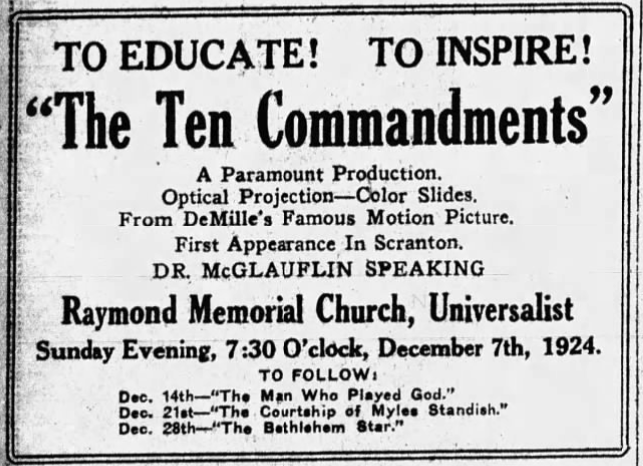
Ten Commandment Advertisement, 1924, The Times-Tribune, Scranton, PA

After the standard introductory doxology and invocation, McGlauflin darkened the room as the church's stereopticon filled the large projection screen with images from contemporary culture. One evening service was based on Cecil B. DeMille's 1923 motion picture The Ten Commandments. McGlauflin used the film to illustrate how religious values were portrayed in popular films. His "illustrated dramas" reversed the meager attendance problem for Sunday evening services. The Scranton Times noted that McGlauflin's presentations "taxed the seating capacity of the Raymond Memorial Universalist Church."

McGlauflin drew upon other popular films, such as D.W. Griffith's America and Fred Niblo's Ben-Hur: A Tale of the Christ and other popular films and plays including The Covered Wagon, The Shepherd King, The Miracle, Courtship of Myles Standish, The Boys of Flanders, The Old Homestead, Smilin'Through, and The Fool.

McGlauflin also drew upon his private collection of vacation photos as subjects for both his Sunday morning sermons and his evening illustrated programs. McGlauflin and his wife frequently took weeks-long, multi-thousand-mile car trips during the summer, giving him an ample supply of photos and topics.

=== Civic Duty - Public Forum ===
McGlauflin contributed in many ways to the civic life in Scranton providing invocation prayers at meetings, addresses at key events, or serving on committees. McGlauflin took on a very public leadership role when he proposed that Scranton should establish a Public Forum. Such forums were popular at the time. McGlauflin advocated that Scranton should have a free platform for discussing vital questions. He believed that such an experience gave participants a better understanding of the aspirations, interests, and desires of others in the community.

McGlauflin's efforts were successful. He served as president of the committee that created the forum and was subsequently elected as the first president of the organization, which held its inaugural Public Forum in May 1919.

=== Worldview Engagement ===
As a denominational leader, McGlauflin was well-informed on global affairs and had a global view related to Universalism and the foreign policy of the United States.

==== International Congress of Religious Liberals ====
At the start of the twentieth century, the denomination began to re-evaluate the theological tenets of Universalism, seeing Universalism as more than just a belief in salvation for all, but as a universal spiritual principle.

The Parliament of the World's Religions that was simultaneously convened in Chicago at the 1893 international World's Columbian Exposition was an opportunity for Universalists to evangelize this worldview message. Several prominent Universalist leaders attended this world congress, including Rev. I.M. Atwood, General Superintendent, Rev. Henry L. Canfield, who was among the early sponsors of the Harriman church, and Rev. Q.H. Shinn, the long-time Universalist evangelist. The papers presented and addresses made were published in a volume called The Columbian Congress of the Universalist Church. The next Parliament was long delayed until 1993.

At this time, McGlauflin was not a denominational leader. By the time he became the General Superintendent in 1907, the denomination had expanded its international presence with its Mission to Japan. Universalist leaders also attended meetings of the International Council of Unitarian and Other Liberal Religious Thinkers and Workers. This international organization was founded by the Unitarians in 1900 with the aim to "open communication with those in all lands who are striving to unite pure religion and perfect liberty." (italic in original text)

The first International Council met in London and then met approximately every other year. During McGlauflin's General Superintendency, delegates were sent to the fourth, fifth, and sixth congresses in Boston (1907), Berlin (1910), and in Paris (1914). McGlauflin attended the Paris conference. In the Board's annual report, it stated, "It is to our advantage to be connected with this International Movement." Adding, "it gives us an opportunity of bringing our ideas before the Liberal people of other countries and promoting peace and brotherhood everywhere."

==== World Disarmament ====
For several years, McGlauflin was a member of the World Alliance for the Promotion of International Friendship Through the Churches. Organized in 1914 and better known as the World Alliance, this international ecumenical organization was founded to promote peace, human rights, and religious freedom by facilitating cooperation among churches.

Locally, McGlauflin coordinated with other Scranton ministers to rally church members for the upcoming disarmament discussions in Washington, D.C. Also known as the Washington Naval Conference, the meeting resulted in the Five-Power Treaty, which limited naval power in the Pacific area.

As a prelude to the upcoming Washington, D.C. disarmament conference, McGlauflin preached a sermon entitled "New Pathways to Peace." In this November 1921 sermon, McGlauflin drew inspiration from Romans 14:19, saying, "Let us follow after the things that make for peace." McGlauflin was among the ministers from Scranton who attended the conference's opening.

== Alice Gertrude McGlauflin ==
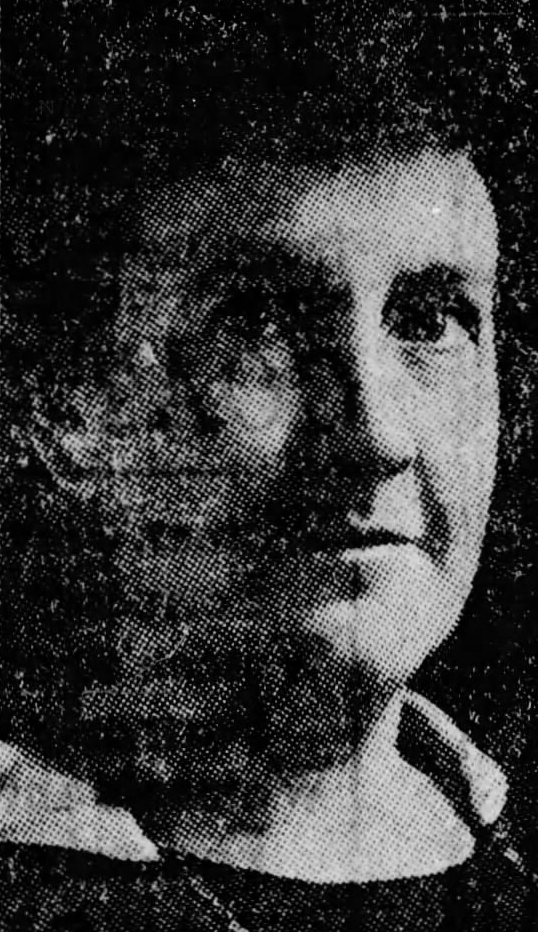
Alice Gertrude Coe McGlauflin, wife of Rev. H.W. McGlauflin ca 1923

McGlauflin's wife, Alice, had a career equally illustrious as her husband's, whom she married in 1912. The information below is only representative of her activities.

- She was a member of the National Society of New England Women, Scranton colony, serving as the organization's president (1921).
- Member of the Scranton Chapter of the Daughters of the American Revolution serving as the organization's treasurer (1919) and Regent (1923).
- She was the Universalist representative to the annual meeting of the Federation of the Woman's Foreign Mission Board (1923).
- She was the first vice-president of the Universalist's Woman's National Missionary Association (1923).

After her husband's death, she moved to Washington, D.C., to become the editor of the American Art Annual magazine. She held that position from 1927 to 1939. In 1936, she was the editor of the first edition of Who's Who in American Art. She died in January 1967. Her funeral was conducted at the National Memorial Universalist Church, where she was a member. Her remains were buried in Quincy, Massachusetts.

== Publications ==
McGlauflin wrote and published one book and several pamphlets for the Universalist library of missionary literature. His book was a biography of the Universalist missionary, Rev. Quillen H. Shinn.

There is an entry in the Encyclopedia of American Biography, 1800 - 1902, stating that he authored another book, described as a memorial to his first wife, Lucy Sibley McGlauflin. Research could not confirm that such a book was published.

A 1924 article in The Scranton Republican referred to an upcoming book entitled Good Luck, which references the location where Rev. John Murray preached the first Universalist sermon in America in 1772 in Murray Grove, New Jersey. There is no evidence that the book was ever published.

Book

- Faith and Power: The Life Story of Q.H. Shinn, D.D., 1912. Book written by McGlauflin as General Superintendent commemorating the life of long-time Universalist missionary, Rev. Quillen Hamilton Shinn.

Contributions to the library of missionary literature

- "Wichita Manual Training Association." McGlauflin, as General Superintendent, continued to support this school founded by the minister of the First Universalist church, Rev. G.A. King, which received funding in the General Convention's Home Mission budget.
- "Our New Americans." No description available.
- "The Faith of the Universalist Church." First appeared as an article in the Baptist Seminary Magazine. Later published in three editions of 10,000 copies each by the Universalist Publishing House.
- "What the Universalist Church is Doing." Illustrated booklet on Universalism, which reached sales of 10,000 copies, authored by McGlauflin while General Superintendent.
- "Our Mission to the Colored People." Eight-page pamphlet authored by McGlauflin while General Superintendent. The pamphlet describes and endorses the religious and educational services provided by Rev. Joseph Jordon in Suffolk, Virginia.

== Death ==
William Henry McGlauflin died in Scranton, Pennsylvania, on March 8, 1927, at age 70. McGlauflin never fully recovered from an illness caused by a throat abscess he suffered a year and a half earlier. The illness forced him to step down from his pulpit at the John Raymond Universalist Memorial Church for several weeks. He sufficiently recovered from this bout of illness to embark on a planned visit to the Holy Land. However, he again fell ill in the fall of 1926, requiring a ten-week stay at the sanitarium in Clifton Springs, NY. He again recovered and returned to the pulpit to celebrate his tenth anniversary of serving as pastor at the John Raymond Universalist Memorial Church. However, on the evening of March 8, he died rather suddenly in his home study of a heart attack. His passing was reported in a banner headline in The Scranton Republican, his hometown paper.

His funeral at the John Raymond Universalist Memorial Church was officiated by Rev. John Smith Lowe, who had succeeded McGlauflin as the general superintendent. His body was then transported to Massachusetts, where it was interred at the Mt. Wollaston Cemetery in Quincy, Massachusetts. The service was conducted by Rev. Dr. Lee S. McCollester, dean of the Crane Theological School of Tufts College, and Rev. John Murray Atwood, dean of the St. Lawrence Theological School.

Also attending the graveside ceremony were Rev. John Smith Lowe and Rev. Roger F. Etz, who would later succeed Lowe as general superintendent, Dr. George E. Huntley, president of the Universalist Sunday School Association, Dr. John S. Van Schiak, editor of the Christian Leader, Dr. Harold Marshall, manager of the Universalist Publishing House, and Rev. Hosea Ballou, the president of the Universalist Historical Society and a descendant of Rev. Hosea Ballou (1771–1852), a foundational figure in American Universalism.
