= Athalia L. J. Irwin =

American minister (1862–1915)

Rev. Athalia Lizzie Johnson Irwin
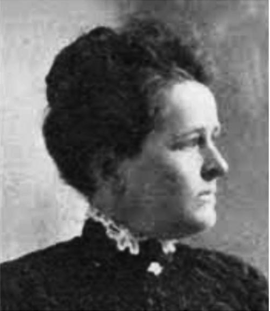
- Born: September 23, 1862; El Dorado, Arkansas, U.S.
- Died: October 6, 1915 (aged 53); Colton, California, U.S.
- Burial place: Columbia, South Carolina
- Education: St. Lawrence Theological School, Canton,NY
- Occupation: Universalist Minister
- Years active: 14
- Spouse: George Iwrin
- Children: Mabel J. Irwin
- Parent(s): Rev. William C. Johnson and Elizabeth Jane Gray
- Religion: Univeralist
- Church: First Universalist Church (Pensacola, FL), Cottage Chapel (Little Rock, AR), Universalist Church (Riverside, CA)
- Ordained: 1902
- Offices held: Editor of The Universalist Herald (1911 - 1913)

Athalia Lizzie Johnson Irwin (September 23, 1862 – October 6, 1915) was an American Universalist minister who broke gender barriers within her denomination. She was the first Southern-born woman to be ordained in the Universalist denomination and was also often the first female minister to serve in the pulpit of churches in the South and West. She was the first female editor of The Universalist Herald, a religious newspaper serving the American South. Irwin's ministerial career, which started later in life, was significantly influenced by two forces: Rev. Quillen Shinn, a venerable Universalist missionary, and the missionary zeal of the Young People's Christian Union (YPCU).

== Early life ==
Athalia Lizzie Johnson was born on September 23, 1862, in El Dorado, Arkansas. She was the sixth child of the Baptist minister Rev. William C. Johnson (born 1825) and Elizabeth Jane Gray (1828–1870). Both her parents were raised, married, and gave birth to their first four children in Georgia. In 1856, Elder W.C. Johnson was ordained in the Baptist faith in Georgia as an "Evangelist of the Gospel Ministry." At this time, the Johnson family lived in Valley Plains in Harris County, Georgia, where Johnson made a living as a preacher/farmer.

Sometime in the late 1850s, Johnson moved his family to the rural city of El Dorado, Arkansas. Johnson served as a part-time minister to the El Dorado Baptist Church and the nearby Hopewell Missionary Baptist Church. However, as was typical for many preachers of this time, Johnson continued to support his family by farming. He was relatively prosperous. In 1860, just a few years after he arrived in Arkansas, he owned 30 acres of land, a lot in town, horses, cattle, and four enslaved people. Johnson's fortunes were reversed by the American Civil War (1861-1865). In 1867, he was required to sell his land to settle debts and leave the pastorate of El Dorado Baptist Church.

Johnson then moved his family to Ladonia, located in the northwest corner of Texas. After the death of his wife in 1870, Johnson moved again, this time back to Georgia. He settled in Cuthbert, Georgia, where he lived with his children, Leila, Anne, Athalia, and another daughter, identified only as F.V. Johnson. At some point in the 1880s, he moved to Atlanta, Georgia , where newspaper accounts report that he was preaching in the city's Baptist churches.

Athalia's siblings were Ophelia C. Johnson (1847-DoD), Madison A. Johnson (1849-DoD), Mason Gray Johnson (1851-1915), Leila I. Johnson (1855-1931), Anne E. Johnson (1860-1948), and F.V. Johnson (1869-DoD).

The children were raised in the Baptist faith, with Mason following in his father's footsteps, becoming an ordained Baptist minister. In 1884, in Newnan, Georgia, her father baptized Athalia, 22, into the Baptist faith. At that time, Athalia worked as a bookkeeper for the Singer Sewing Machine Company.

== Education ==
No information has been found regarding Athalia's early education. However, seven years into her Universalist ministry, Irwin paused her active ministry to attend the St. Lawrence Theological School (1908-1911) in Canton, New York. Her daughter, Mabel, and Marie Josephine Schaefer, a long-time assistant to Irwin, also attended school with her. Her husband, George, also relocated to Canton.

When entering her studies, Irwin had announced that she planned to focus on psychotherapeutic training. This choice of study, which centered on emotional, psychological, or spiritual issues through structured conversations, was consistent with sermons that Irwin recently delivered, including "Psychology of Prayer" and "Psycho-Therapy - The New Christian Healing; What is It?"

Upon graduation, Athalia earned her Bachelor of Divinity (B.D.). She, along with fellow graduating classmate H.W. Haynes, was chosen as the commencement speaker for their graduating class.

Following her graduation, Irwin moved to Canon, Georgia .

== Marriage and Children ==
On May 27, 1886, Athalia, 24, married George W. Irwin (1845-1917), who was seventeen years her senior, in Atlanta, Georgia. The marriage announcement in The Atlanta Journal read

At half-past seven this morning at No. 56 Washington St. was the scene of an early marriage, in which the contracting parties were Major G.W. Irwin, a prominent merchant in Columbia S.C. and Miss Athalia L. Johnson of this city. The ceremony was performed by the bride's father, Rev. W.C. Johnson, in a brief, beautiful, but impressive manner. The happy couple left at 8:00 AM for Columbia, South Carolina via Augusta. The bride is a lady of culture and rare personal grace, and the Journal is in common with her numerous friends, tenders its hearty congratulations.

Her husband, the son of S.W. Irwin, a civil engineer, was born and educated in Cincinnati. When he married, he was living in Columbia, South Carolina. The news account of his marriage incorrectly referred to the groom as "Major G.W. Irwin." Although Irwin enlisted in the Union Army in 1863, he carried no rank into civilian life. However, he was commonly called "Captain" because of his involvement in local, amateur theatrical productions.

The Irwins had only one child, Mabel J. Irwin (1877-1974). Mabel never married and continued to live with her parents even as they traveled the country for her mother's ministry. She remained with her parents when they moved to Riverside, California. Later, she lived in Colton, Redondo Beach, and La Verne, California. Mabel was an educator, teaching high school from 1924 to 1952. She died in La Verne, California, at the Hillcrest Homes Infirmary.

As noted, the Irwins moved to Columbia, South Carolina, after their 1886 marriage. A few years after arriving in Columbia, Athalia opened her 12-room home at 1512 Sumter Street to boarders. Beginning in 1889, her large home was the center of Irwin's boarding house business. Three years later, in 1901, she sold the building and moved to Pensacola, Florida, to become the minister of the city's Universalist church.

== Universalist Ministry ==
Although Irwin came to Universalism late in life, she had a very active career both as a parish minister and as an influential leader within the denomination.

=== Adoption of Universalism ===
In 1898, while living in Columbia, Irwin withdrew her membership from the Baptist Church at the age of 36. She then dedicated her life to the Universalist cause. Irwin described this moment as a “release,” saying that her acceptance of Universalism was “a desire to be honest to herself and the church.” She commemorated the event in a poem she wrote that same day of her resignation from her Baptist faith, called “Gethsemane,” which includes this verse.

I once was happy in the faith I this day yield,
But nothing have I now my drifting life to shield.

The God whom I once loved I scorn as cruel, cold,
I'd rather have no God than Him I loved of old.

Apart from her poem, Irwin left no record of what motivated her religious transformation. Martha W. Rimmer, in her treatment of Irwin, published in the 2005 edition of the Journal of Unitarian and Universalist History, offered a plausible explanation. Her marriage into an Ohio family with its Midwest associations offered her a contrast to her family's Southern Baptist orthodoxy. She lived in Columbia, South Carolina's capital, which exposed her to a diverse range of people and ideas. Her ownership of a boarding house placed her in direct contact with travelers trying to tap into the emerging new South economy.

Columbia was also the home of Rev. D.B. Clayton (1817-1906), a veteran Southern Universalist minister who preached throughout the state, including Columbia. Irwin became involved with the city's Universalist community. In a 1899 letter she wrote for the Universalist Herald, she shared a picnic experience.

As we rode through the streets of Columbia, quite a respectable looking procession both as to quality and numbers, I was sorry we did not have a flag floating over our wagons enscribed (SIC) with the one word “Universalism,” for there are some people here who think we do not amount to much.

Her involvement in her newly adopted faith and her visibility in Southern Universalism steady grew. She began to write a recurring column in the Universalist Herald entitled “Sunday School Lessons.” For her contributions, she was awarded the title of Associate Editor—an honorific title granted to faithful contributors to this Southern Universalist publication. She continued her column from 1899 to 1908.

She also engaged with her local Universalist community by attending the 1899 South Carolina Convention of Universalists, where she was elected secretary of the convention. The convention's keynote speaker was Rev. Quillen H. Shinn (1845-1907). Shinn was an indefatigable Southern Universalist missionary who planted the seeds of Universalist societies, earning him the title of the Grasshopper Missionary.

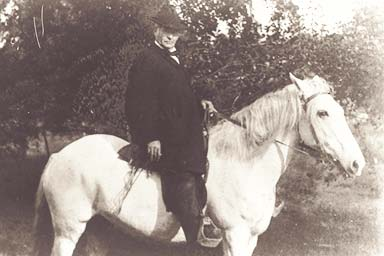
Rev. Quillen H. Shinn Grasshopper Missionary

Irwin's ministerial career became intertwined with Shinn and the Young People's Christian Union (Y.P.C.U.). Shinn was the group's national organizer. The Y.P.C.U., organized in 1890, was the Universalists’ youth group with a particular focus on missionary work to establish new Universalist societies.

Irwin shared her experience attending her first Young People's Christian Union annual meeting in 1900. She remarked, “First of all, I am impressed with the fact that I have identified with a great and loyal denomination.” She went on to compare the Universalist Church to a vine, and the Y.P.C.U. as the “tendrils which enable it to climb.”

Irwin also became involved in a newly formed enterprise called the Southern Industrial Institute, located in Camp Hill, Alabama. Irwin, along with Shinn, Clayton, Chapman, and other Universalists, was listed as a member of the Board of Trustees on the 1901 incorporation documents for this organization. However, this appointment to the Institute's board appears to have been honorary. Little evidence has been found to indicate that she substantially engaged in the operation of the school, which was designed to offer manual education to white rural students.

Just three years after adopting Universalism, Irwin received her license to preach in 1901. She credited Shinn with encouraging her to pursue a life in Universalist ministry.

=== Americus, Georgia ===
Despite having no formal ministerial training other than being the daughter of a Baptist minister, Athalia began her preaching career. Her first ministry was brief, consisting of a series of sermons she delivered in July 1901 at the Universalist Church of the Redeemer in Americus, Georgia. She continued to reside in Columbia and traveled to Americus only to deliver her sermon series.

Universalism was not unfamiliar in Americus. About twenty-five years earlier, Rev. L.F.W. Andrews (1802-1875), an early Southern Universalist minister and publisher of both denominational and secular newspapers, preached and lived in Americus. More recently, in 1900, Rev. Shinn had founded the Church of the Redeemer. The church's dedication took place in December of that year, attended by Rev. Shinn, Rev. Thomas Chapman, the Georgia State Missionary, and Rev. D.B. Clayton of Columbia. Irwin also participated in the planning for the church's dedication.

In the spring of 1902, the Americus church extended an offer to Irwin to be their called pastor, referring to her as “the best speaker in the Universalist church.” However, Irwin accepted a call from the Universalist church in Pensacola, Florida.

=== Pensacola, Florida ===
Irwin began her first full-time ministry at the First Universalist Church in Pensacola in 1902. The First Universalist Church was another society that Shinn organized in 1895. Three years later, in 1898, the church held a dedication for its new building on East Chase Street. The next year, the church reported that its society consisted of 36 families, 43 people in its Sunday school program, of which 19 formed a chapter of the Young People's Christian Union.

Since its founding, preaching services were provided by an array of ministers, including visits from Rev. Shinn, and other ministers who lived in Florida: Rev. John C. Burruss, former editor of the Universalist Herald, Rev. Everet Green, and Rev. R.P. Ambler from nearby DeFuniak Springs, who was once incorrectly identified as the pastor of the Pensacola Church. The most support came from Rev. F.L. Leavitt from nearby Brewton, Alabama, which was 60 miles north of Pensacola.

The church's invitation to Irwin may reasonably have been influenced by Shinn, who had connections with both the Pensacola society and Irwin. She began her pastorate in the Spring of 1902, delivering sermons entitled: “Man's Original Sin, Total Depravity,” “Regeneration, the New Birth,” “Heaven,” and “Heresy.” In September, Irwin, along with her husband and daughter, moved to Pensacola and settled at 500 North Hayne Street. The local newspaper heralded Irwin's arrival as “a brilliant woman and interesting speaker.” Adding that “Mrs. Irwin comes highly recommended as an earnest, consecrated Christian.”

The church ordained Irwin in November 1902. Rev. Dr. W.H. McGlauflin, minister of the First Universalist Church of Atlanta, another missionary project of the Young People's Christian Union, conducted the ordination ceremony. Commemorating her ordination, Irwin wrote a poem entitled "Heaven," included in her 1905 A Bouquet of Verses, that included these lines.

Oh, send me out to tell the nations of a love
That bars no soul outside that heavenly home above.

With her ordination, Irwin was the next generation of female ordained Universalist ministers following in the footsteps of pioneer ministers such as Lydia Ann Jenkins (1825-1874), Olympia Brown (1835–1926), Augusta Jane Chapin (1836–1905), Phebe Hanaford (1829–1921) and Florence Kollock (1848–1925). Irwin, however, was in the vanguard of Southern-born females ordained by the denomination.

Irwin settled into her first call ministry, delivering Sunday morning and evening services, overseeing the Young People's Christian Union meetings, and conducting weekday evening prayer and Bible study meetings. During her pastorate, the church continued its social traditions, including candy pulls, ice cream socials, chicken pie suppers, and other events.

Irwin's one-year ministry in Pensacola was uneventful, but she used this ministry to raise her profile within the denomination. She participated in the dedication of a new society in Florala, Alabama conducted a missionary tour of Georgia and South Carolina, attended the national General Convention of Universalists in Washington, D.C., and delivered what would be in the post-Civil Rights era a controversial address at the Universalist Ministers’ Institute in Ferry Beach, Maine entitled “The Race Problem from a Southern Woman's Point of View.” However, her address raised no contemporary objections.

Four weeks after returning to Pensacola from her northern travels, Irwin left Florida to accept the pastorate of the Universalist church in Little Rock, Arkansas. Prior to her travels, there was no indication that Irwin planned to leave her Florida pulpit. Yet, during her trip north, she spoke with denominational leaders who supported the 1901 imperative of the Young People's Christian Union to make St. Paul, Minnesota, and Little Rock, Arkansas, the targets for its missionary efforts.

In the several years since the 1901 declaration to focus on Little Rock, things had changed. Rev. F. L. Carrier, formerly from New Hampshire, who had been appointed to the city's pulpit to fulfill the Y.P.C.U. mandate, had resigned. Irwin, with her Southern heritage and family ties to the city, made her a perfect replacement. She also had a personal motive for accepting the Little Rock position. She confessed that her Pensacola church was simply not financially strong enough to support the salary of a full-time minister.

=== Little Rock, Arkansas ===
Shinn most likely led the effort to persuade Irwin to accept this new pulpit. Shinn laid the foundation for the society in 1896 through his missionary work. Shinn continued this missionary work under the auspices of the Y.P.C.U. from 1899 to 1900.

When Irwin arrived in the fall of 1904, the local newspapers highlighted her Southern heritage and family ties to the city. The local newspapers also observed that she was the only female pastor in the town from any denomination. As with Pensacola, she soon settled into a routine of delivering morning and evening sermons each Sunday.

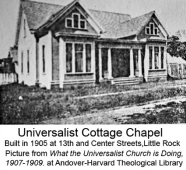
Chapel Cottage Universalist Church Little Rock, AR

She also concluded her predecessor's efforts to relocate the church from its rental space in the old Congregational Church on 11th and Main Streets to a new building called Cottage Chapel on 13th and Main Streets.

Irwin wasted little time broadening the visibility of her small Universalist church. Just a few months into her pastorate, she made a public appeal “to the liberal minded Christians of Little Rock” to hear her speak in a series of sermons on her Universalist creed. Asking,

If you are not satisfied with the doctrines to which you have been accustomed to listen, you owe it to yourself to look around for something that will satisfy you.

Her appeal included a personal touch, offering to meet people in their homes or at her study on Arch Street. As the year came to an end, the Arkansas Democrat remarked that the services at the Universalist church “are made especially interesting by the pastor, Rev. Athalia L.J. Irwin, whose preaching is most eloquent and reasonable.”

Irwin, nonetheless, had to compete with “hellfire revivals and midnight conversions” rooted deeply in Southern Christianity. Her offer to sit in her parlor discussing a loving God fared poorly in contrast to the emotional and flamboyant tent revivals that frequently occupied the residents of Little Rock night after night. Irwin recognized the powerful appeal of cries for redemption and public pleas for forgiveness. She remarked in late 1905,

I could have almost had sprung to my feet there and then with a glad message of love and redemption for all on my lips, but no, I was bound down by impassible barriers; I must make my own opportunity.

Irwin was not without recourse. In May 1906, she, with the assistance of Marie Schaffer, began publishing a small newspaper, the Arkansas Pilot. The mission of the Pilot was to spread the good news of Universalism through articles, sermonettes and a sprinkling of Irwin's own poetry. The newspaper found a degree of success in its short life, with subscribers found in 27 states, Mexico, and the Arizona Territory.

==== Debate with Brother ====
Irwin received the most media attention in June 1906 when she debated her brother, Mason, a recent graduate of the Southern Baptist Theological Seminary, at her Little Rock Cottage Church. The five-day debate covered topics such as Universalist and Orthodox Belief in Christ, The Bible We Accept, The Christ We Would Follow, The Punishment We Expect, and Salvation I Would Attain. The debate drew large crowds.

The Daily Arkansas Democrat, reflective of the prevailing conservative views of the city, characterized Irwin's opening comments in the first debate as “pathetic in the extreme.” The Democrat, however, later conceded that Irwin made a forceful defense of the loving God in which she believed. Through the final debate, both siblings remained in sharp disagreement.

Irwin rejected any doctrine based on fear of eternal hopelessness. Stating that her God of Universalism “wills that not any should perish but that all should come to a knowledge of the truth as it is in Christ Jesus.” Insisting that love is the “motive power of the universe,” adding “fear never having been an incentive to any cause worthy the creation of a monument.”

Her brother, to shouts of “amen” from the Baptists in attendance, declared that only those who embrace the mission of Jesus Christ are saved. Jesus Christ, he preached, lived, and died according to scripture. Echoing John 3:16, he assured his listeners that “He that believeth in Him shall have everlasting life, but he that believeth not shall be damned.”

Despite the sharp contrasts in opinion, the debate was not seen as a bitter dispute. Rather, it was a rare opportunity to hear two opposing views of Christian theology offered by a brother and sister. Local Baptists declared that Mason had won the day. For the city's Universalists, their minister was the clear winner. The Detroit Free Press called the debate for Irwin, declaring that she “beat him out.” In his interview with the Detroit Free Press, Mason is reported to have remarked, “Sis, it (meaning Universalism) isn't so bad after all.”

==== Notable Sermons ====
In January 1907, Irwin discontinued the tradition of preaching both a Sunday morning and Sunday evening sermon. Without the need to preach two weekly sermons, Irwin was then able to concentrate her time on more in-depth and topical sermon topics.

In March 1907, Irwin delivered two sermons that were widely reported upon.

Woman's Place in the World

On Sunday, March 3, 1907, she delivered a sermon entitled “Woman's Place in the World” to a filled church with women from the Woodmen Circle, a female auxiliary of the Woodmen of the World. After reciting biblical and historical instances where women have ruled from thrones and organized and led armies, she concluded.

A woman's place in the world of today is any place and every place she can and wants to fill, from legislative halls and courtrooms to the parlor and kitchen; from the counting rooms and council chambers to laboratory and studio; from the school room and university to college matron and chambermaid; from the plow handles and the cotton fields, if she will, to the pulpit and the press. This, I say, is the place, in my opinion, of a woman in the world today.

St. Paul and Women in the Ministry

In her March 24, 1907, sermon, “St. Paul and Women in the Ministry,” she defended her ministry from those who claimed she was ineligible to preach due to Paul's teachings. Irwin cited scripture frequently used to diminish her authority to preach. She first cited 1 Timothy 2:12, "I suffer not a woman to teach, nor to usurp authority over the man, but to be in silence." Later citing 1 Corinthians 14: 34-35. “Let your women keep silent in the churches for it is not permitted unto them to speak. . . and if they will learn anything, let them ask their husbands at home, for it is a shame for a woman to speak in the church.”

Irwin praised those who showed loyalty to Paul's biblical teaching, especially in an era of growing criticism and skepticism of biblical teachings. She then pivoted, observing that some of Paul's most ardent followers, a not subtle illusion to the ministers who criticize her, are “the slowest” to accept the contradictions of his teachings.

In particular, she noted the hypocrisy of current ministers ignoring Paul's teachings on a woman's dress or the shunning of widows. Yet, these same ministers still insisted on the legitimacy of Paul's prohibition of women in the pulpit. Irwin's defense of women in the pulpit continued, mentioning the Old Testament prophetess, Huldah, even calling into question who was the greater sinner in the Garden of Eden, Adam or Eve. Her defense of her right to preach was extensive and revealed a command of scriptural scholarship.

Although not active in the suffrage movement, these two sermons were noted a century later by the authors of the 2022 publication of Stateswomen: A Centennial History of Arkansas Women Legislators 1922-2022. The authors noted that Irwin was an early "an important voice" in the fight for women's equality.

==== Expanding Denominational Profile ====
Throughout her Little Rock ministry, Irwin continued her practice of attending denominational national conventions and the annual meetings of the Young People's Christian Union. During her church's summer recess, she attended the annual Y.P.C.U. Conventions. There, she and Rev. Dean Ellenwood from Atlanta, whose ministries were supported by the Y.P.C.U., provided updates to the convention's delegated on the progress of their churches.

Irwin also attended regional state conventions in Arkansas, Texas, and Kentucky. Her attendance at such events conferred on Irwin a degree of celebrity status. Coverage, for example, in the local newspaper the Hopkinsville Kentuckian for her 1907 attendance at the Kentucky State Convention included a two-column photograph accompanied by the convention agenda, which showed the several sermons she preached.

==== Resignation ====
Irwin's four-year ministry in Little Rock ended in the fall of 1908 when she resigned her pastorate. She resigned in order to study at St. Lawrence Theological School in Canton, New York. She preached her final sermon in the Cottage Chapel on Sunday, September 5, 1908, and then boarded a train the next day for Canton.

=== Canon, Georgia ===
While still studying at St. Lawrence Theological School, Irwin had traveled to Canon, Georgia, to make arrangements upon her graduation in 1911 to become the editor of The Universalist Herald newspaper. The Herald, founded in 1847, had been published by its longtime editor, John C. Burruss, in Notasulga, Alabama and Montgomery, Alabama. In 1896, Rev. John M. Bowers purchased the paper, became its editor, and moved its publication to Canon, Georgia. Irwin would be the editor from 1911 to 1913.

The Herald, since its founding, had been a Southern regional newspaper “devoted to Universalism and the cause of the Universalist Church in the South.” Like other regional publications with a relatively small subscriber base, financial stability was a concern. Shortly after becoming the editor, Irwin attended the 1911 General Convention of Universalists in Springfield, Massachusetts. There, she won the endorsement of the Herald “as a publication that is doing excellent work in spreading the doctrine of Universalism.” Irwin then successfully solicited pledges of financial support from the convention attendees.

Canon, located 100 miles northeast of Atlanta, had a thriving church. Its 1912 membership of 175 made it the largest church in Georgia, along with Atlanta's 154 members; the two churches represented 45% of all Universalists in the state.

Irwin did not assume ministerial duties at the local Canon church; with Rev. J.M. Rasnake remaining the minister during her time in Canon. Rasnake was also Georgia's Universalist State Superintendent.

However, she articipatde in local Universalist denominational affairs. In 1911, she preached a sermon at the Alabama State Convention of Universalists at the Florala church, a church she helped establish during her ministry in Little Rock. During that trip to Alabama, she also took the opportunity to preach again at First Universalist Church in Pensacola. The local newspaper noted that, “she was very much loved by her congregation and highly esteemed by those outside who knew her.”

The following year, Irwin and Rasnake organized a Young People's Christian Union at the Canon Church in March 1912. Then, in the fall of that year, Irwin preached a sermon at the inaugural meeting of the State Convention of the Young People's Christian Union in Feasterville, South Carolina. Irwin's daughter, Mabel, made a presentation at this meeting of her attendance at the National Y.P.C.U. Convention held in Chicago, Illinois. Irwin's time in Canon and role as editor of the Herald effectively came to an end in May 1913, when she accepted the call to the Riverside church in California. She resigned as editor of the Herald. Alexander S. Arnold then briefly edited the paper.

=== Riverside, California ===
No information has been found explaining why Irwin accepted a pastorate so far from her ancestral Southern roots. She arrived in Riverside with her husband, daughter, Mabel, and sister, Leila Johnson in September 1913.

Her new church had a storied past, having been founded in the 1870s and served by a succession of ministers. Most ironically, the last minister to serve the church before Irwin's arrival was Rev. F.L. Carrier, the same minister who had vacated the Little Rock pulpit prior to Irwin's arrival in Arkansas in 1904.

The local newspapers welcomed Irwin with a recitation of her ministerial career but also noted the rarity of a female minister holding the pulpit at a Riverside church. It was cited that only one other woman had earlier occupied a pulpit in that city.

Upon arrival, she assumed the expected duties of a minister, including conducting Sunday services, officiating at weddings, and attending funerals. Her two-year ministry was generally unremarkable. As expected, Irwin attended the July 1915 General Convention of Universalists, which convened in Pasadena, California, that year. Her appearance that the general convention was among the last of her public appearances. In early October, she fell gravely ill.

== Publications ==
Only one publication attributed to Irwin has been discovered, a book of poems entitled A Bouquet of Verses.

== Death ==
Athalia Lizzie Johnson Irwin died in Colton, California, on October 6, 1915, at age 53. The cause of death was recorded as typhoid fever. It is believed she contracted the infection during a summer visit to nearby Redondo Beach. She had been quite ill for several days, drifting in and out of consciousness.

Her funeral was held at All Souls Universalist in Riverside with Rev. Horace Porter of the First Congregational church officiating. She was survived by her husband, George Irwin, her daughter, Mabel, Leila Johnson, a sister living with her at the time of her death, another sister, Anne E. Torneu (née Johnson) of Greensboro, North Carolina, and her brother, Mason Johnson, with whom she debated while ministering to the Universalist church in Little Rock.

Her body was then cremated and the remains sent to Columbia, South Carolina, where they were interred at the Elmwood Cemetery in that city. Engraved on her tombstone are lines from the poem she wrote upon her ordination into the Universalist ministry in 1902.

Oh, send me out to tell the nations of a love
That bars no soul outside that heavenly home above.
