= Elmwood Cemetery (Columbia, South Carolina) =

- U.S. National Register of Historic Places
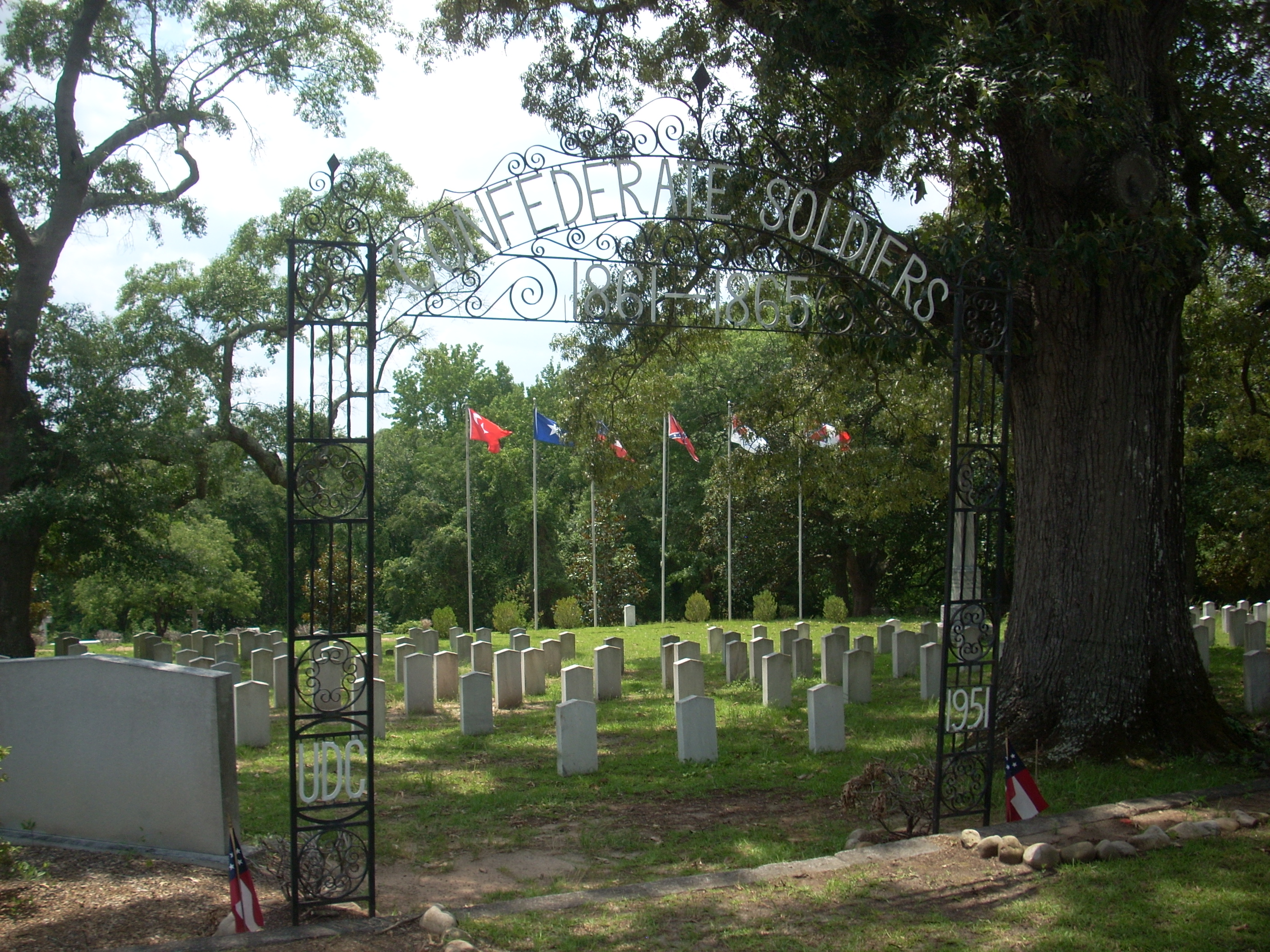
- Elmwood Cemetery, Confederate Cemetery Entrance, July 2012

- Location within South Carolina Location within the United States
- Location: 501 Elmwood Ave., Columbia, South Carolina
- Coordinates: 34°0′50″N 81°3′13″W
- Area: 168.5 acres (68.2 ha)
- Built: 1854, 1921
- NRHP reference No.: 96000984
- Added to NRHP: September 6, 1996

Elmwood Cemetery is a historic rural cemetery located at Columbia, South Carolina, United States. It was established in 1854, and expanded in 1921. The older section is heavily wooded and has a section devoted to Confederate dead.

It was added to the National Register of Historic Places in 1996.

== Notable burials ==
- Christie Benet (1879–1951), American Democratic politician who briefly represented South Carolina in the United States Senate in 1918.
- Daniel Bragg Clayton (1817–1906), an American Southern Universalist minister who was instrumental in spreading and defending Universalism in the Southeast United States.
- Walter Clinton Goodpasture Jr. (1917–1942), a United States Marine Corps captain during World War II and his wife Mary Brennen (née Daly) Goodpasture (1921–1942) who were two of the 492 victims of the Cocoanut Grove fire.
- Walter Higbe (1915–1985), American professional baseball player who played in five of the Major League Baseball teams from 1937 until 1950, including the Brooklyn Dodgers.
- Athalia L. J. Irwin (1862–1915), an American Universalist minister who broke gender barriers within her denomination. She was the first female editor of The Universalist Herald.
- William Zachariah Leitner (1829–1888), state representative and senator and South Carolina Secretary of State.
- Alva M. Lumpkin (1886–1941), American Democratic politician who briefly represented South Carolina in the United States Senate in 1941.
