= Young People's Christian Union =

Universalist youth group

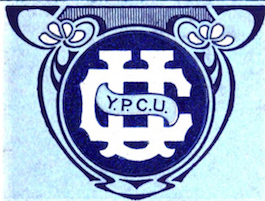
- Pin and colors for the Young People's Christian Union of the Universalist Church of America

The Young People's Christian Union (Y.P.C.U.), organized in 1889, was a Universalist youth group created to develop the spiritual life of young people and advance the work of the Universalist church. Soon after it was founded, the Y.P.C.U. focused its attention on missionary work. It was instrumental in the founding of new southern churches and the creation of a Post Office Mission for the distribution of religious literature.

Initially organized as an auxiliary to the Universalist General Convention, the Y.P.C.U. developed an independent identity. It held its own yearly conventions, published a magazine (Onward), implemented funding mechanisms and elected officers.

In 1941, the Young People's Christian Union was re-organized as the Universalist Youth Fellowship. In 1953, the Universalists and Unitarian youth organizations merged to form the Liberal Religious Youth (LRY). After the merger in 1961 of the American Unitarian Association and the Universalist Church of America, LRY was re-organized as the Young Religious Unitarian Universalists (YRUU).

== History ==
=== Early Young People Societies ===
The inspiration for the Young People's Christian Union can be traced to the founding of the Young Men's Christian Association (YMCA) in England.

George Williams, after entering the drapery business in 1841, formed a mutual improvement society with fellow workers. The aim of the society was Bible study and support of missionary efforts. Three years later, Williams and twelve other young men formalized the mission of their support group as the "improvement of the spiritual condition of young men engaged in the drapery and other trades". Membership was later extended to anyone who was "a member of a Christian church" or gave "sufficient evidence of his being a converted character". They called their new society the Young Men's Christian Association (Y.M.C.A.).

By 1855 there were 8,500 Y.M.C.A members in Great Britain. The American version of the Y.M.C.A. soon spread during a period of heightened religious activity called the Third Great Awakening (1850s – 1900).

In 1860, Rev. Dr. Theodore L. Cuyler, minister of the Lafayette Avenue Presbyterian Church in Brooklyn, New York, became aware of the success of the Y.M.C.A. to gather young men for prayer meetings, but that the Y.M.C.A. had not succeeded in organizing them for more sustained Christian work in the church. To address this situation, on November 6, 1867, Rev. Cuyler organized the Young People's Association (YPA). Cuyler's YPA was designed to focus the energy of young men on long-term church work such as "the conversion of souls, the development of Christian character and the training of converts in religious work".

Some years later, Rev. Dr. Francis E. Clark, pastor of the Williston Congregational Church in Portland, Maine, visited the Lafayette Avenue Presbyterian Church. In 1892 he reflected back on his impression of the Young People's Association, stating it "was certainly an inspiration to the first Christian Endeavor Society."

=== Christian Endeavor Society ===
During a monthly Week of Prayer, Rev. Clark observed that similar to the Y.M.C.A. model, the Week of Prayer gathered young people for Christian devotion but afterwards they soon departed. Clark had relied for years upon prevailing wisdom that entertainment, mutual improvement and literary societies would sustain young people's interest in Christian church work. After five years of such efforts, Rev. Clark had little to show.

Clark abandoned the "low expectations" model and opted instead to raise the expectations of the religious obligations of young people. His youth organization would be first and foremost a Christian society. Musical soirees and literary readings may follow, but they would be subordinate to the larger mission of seeking the kingdom of God. On February 2, 1881, Rev. Clark proposed his new society and secured the signature of forty to fifty young people to the constitution of an organization called the Christian Endeavor Society.

Additional societies soon followed in Maine, Vermont and Massachusetts. The absence of a denomination designation enabled a Christian Endeavor Society to be organized within any church denomination. Five years after the organization of the first Christian Endeavor Society, there were 850 societies representing eight denominations from 33 states and seven countries.

Others followed Rev. Clark's model, but created youth groups that were specifically denominationally branded: the Baptist Young People's Union (1891), the Luther League (1896), the Universalist Young People's Christian Union (1889), the Unitarian Young People's Religious Union (1896) and the Methodist Epworth League (1899).

== Universalist Young People's Christian Union ==
The Universalists, not having made any earlier effort to create a unifying national youth organization, discovered that within the denomination there were more than 120 young people's societies including 38 Christian Endeavor Societies and others with names such as "Christian Union", "Christian Culture", and "Christian Work".

This situation was addressed at the 1886 Chicago General Convention with a proposal to create a national youth society called the Young People's Missionary Association (Y.P M.A.). The proposal called for the formation of parish-level associations designed as auxiliaries to state conventions. After the convention, the Y.P.M.A. saw some initial success. More than 20 such organizations were formed, but the Y.P.M.A. did not have wide appeal. Existing youth groups resisted joining the Y.P.M.A., preferring to retain their individual social or literary charters.

Two years later, in 1888, Rev. Stephen H. Roblin revived the idea of a distinctively Universalist nationwide youth group.

=== Bay City, Michigan ===
Shortly after his ordination in 1882, Rev. Roblin assumed the pastorate at the Universalist church in Victor, New York. His experience with his church's Christian Endeavor Society as well as his personal connection with Rev. L.B. Fisher and James D. Tillinghast, publishers of a New York state monthly journal called the Universalist Union, would contribute to the reboot of a Universalist youth organization.

Six years later, in 1888, Rev. Roblin had relocated to Michigan to assume the pastorate of the Universalist church in Bay City. Since his new church did not have a youth group, Rev. Roblin appointed Alfred J. Cardall to form a Christian Endeavor Society. Also closely associated with the formation of this Christian Endeavor Society was Albert G. Grier, a principal in the local school system.

As he organized his local youth group, Roblin became curious about denominational support for a revised national youth society. Roblin recruited Cardall and Grier, who had just formed the local Bay City Christian Endeavor Society, and Fisher and Tillinghast, publishers of the Universalist Union, to conduct a correspondence campaign. They contacted Universalist youth groups to ascertain their interest in a Universalist national youth organization. If interested, youth groups were encouraged to send delegates to an organizing meeting to take place a day before the General Convention in Lynn, Massachusetts.

=== Lynn Convention ===
On October 22, 1889, 131 delegates representing 56 societies from 13 states attended the First National Convention of Universalist Young People. By-laws and a constitution for the Young People's Christian Union (Y.P.C.U.) were drafted. The mission of the Y.P.C.U. was "to promote an earnest Christian life among young people of the Universalist Church, and the sympathetic union of all young people's societies in their efforts to make themselves more useful in the service of God." The Universalist Union was adopted as the official press organ of the Y.P.C.U.

The Lynn General Convention approved the youth group's by-laws and constitution. There were, however, those who opposed the formation of the youth group, arguing that no intermediate organization should stand between the church and its people. The opposition insisted that youth groups must be designated as auxiliaries or subordinates to the General Convention and adult supervision must be exercised over the Y.P.C.U.

Nonetheless, over time, the new youth group acquired the profile of an independent organization. In 1893, the Y.P.C.U. assumed responsibility for the publication of the Universalist Union, changing the name to Onward, and modified the format from a monthly to weekly magazine. By 1894 the Y.P.C.U. began holding their conventions independently from those of the General Convention. The Y.P.C.U. also acquired other independent trappings such Y.P.C.U. branded colors (blue for truth, white for purity), motto ("For Christ and His Church"), hymn ("Follow the Gleam") and watchword ("Onward!").

Despite having a national profile, the Y.P.C.U. was at its core a local institution. Churches sponsored a local Y.P.C.U. group that, in turn, was affiliated with a state Y.P.C.U. organization. The local groups could then voluntarily affiliate with the national organization. Also loosely defined was the term "young." It was not uncommon in the early days of the Y.P.C.U. for individuals in their thirties or older to be a member of the local Y.P.C.U. For the truly young, a Junior Y.P.C.U. concept was introduced in 1894, with Mary Grace Canfield being appointed as its first national superintendent. Finally, to provide an organizational structure for young Universalists who did not have a local church community, the Union at Large concept was introduced in 1892, with Sarah B. Hammond being appointed its first national superintendent.

== Y.P.C.U. missionary focus ==
At its first convention in Rochester, New York, in 1890, the Y.P.C.U. turned its focus to missionary work. This focus shaped the actions taken by the Y.P.C.U. in the following years by the appointment of its first missionary, Rev. William H. McGlauflin; granting its secretary a salary; adopting a temperance position; organizing a Post Office Mission for the distribution of religious literature; establishing a funding mechanism called the Two Cent a Week for Missions; explicitly denominationally rebranding the group by appending "of the Universalist Church" to the group's name; and the appointment of Rev. Quillen H. Shinn as their National Organizer.

The first missionary action taken by the Y.P.C.U. was accepting the responsibility to build a new Universalist church in Harriman, Tennessee.

=== Harriman, Tennessee ===
==== Y.P.C.U. missionary work 1890 - 1895 ====
Despite being operational for only one year, building a new church, given the economic situation in Harriman, was a plausible objective for the Y.P.C.U. Harriman was barely a town in early 1890, but growth was almost assured. Northern businessmen through the Tennessee Land Company were making substantial investments in Harriman to exploit abundant coal, iron, timber and limestone resources. Rev. Henry L. Canfield, State Superintendent of Churches and Sunday Schools of Ohio, and Rev. C. Ellwood Nash, then pastor at a Universalist church in Akron, Ohio, encouraged the Harriman missionary project. They argued that in Harriman the Universalists would be the religious vanguard in a burgeoning new city instead of trailing along as late-comers.

Furthermore, Rev. Nash had visited Harriman prior to the Rochester convention. Nash was aware that there were a number of Universalists already in the area and that other conditions in Harriman were favorable to the Y.P.C.U. The East Tennessee Land Company, for example, provided Nash two land lots for a Universalist church. The town's charter with its explicit prohibition on liquor closely aligned with Y.P.C.U. temperance sensibilities. This commitment to temperance was further fortified by the East Tennessee Land Company's plan to construct an institute of higher learning in the city called the American Temperance University.

Adding to these social and economic incentives was financial support offered by Ferdinand Schumacher. A rich German immigrant known as the "oatmeal king", Schumacher, from Ohio, was a Universalist and temperance advocate. Schumacher pledged $1,000 to the church building fund if the Universalists raised $4,000.

The cornerstone to the Grace Universalist Church in Harriman was laid on December 2, 1891. The church was formally dedicated on Easter Sunday, April 17, 1892, with a sermon preached by Rev. Henry L. Canfield. By 1895, the debt-free church had 140 members. The Y.P.C.U. would soon deliver the deed of the church to the General Convention and turn its attention to its next missionary effort in Atlanta.

==== Denouement ====
As the Y.P.C.U. turned its attention to Atlanta in 1895, the fortunes of the Grace Universalist Church reflected the economic downward trajectory of Harriman. Church membership decreased after its first pastor, Rev. W.H. McGlauflin, departed. More misfortune befell the church when McGlauflin's replacement, Rev. Harry Lawrence Veazey, and his wife died in New York state. Rev. Charles R. East, the next pastor, became disheartened and departed. Eleven years after its dedication, even the ever-optimistic Rev. Shinn declared the church dead. An ex-Baptist who joined the Universalist church, Rev. John M. Rasanke, attempted to revive the church, but he too departed in 1904. Several years of dormancy followed.

After World War I, the Universalist Women's National Missionary Association (WNMA) took over responsibility for Tennessee. The WNMA reported in the October issue of the Universalist Leader that the Harriman church, once on the dormant list, was now active with Rev. William E. Manning serving as pastor. However, it would have been more accurate to report that Rev. Manning had only included Harriman on his 1920 – 1921 missionary circuit. The WNMA abandoned the church property in 1923, and the General Convention trustees sold the property in 1927 for $2,500. The old church building was torn down in 1932.

=== Atlanta, Georgia ===
==== Missionary work 1879 - 1882 ====
In the summer of 1879, Rev. W.C. Bowman attempted to establish a Universalist church in Atlanta. The Universalists had a presence in the Georgia countryside, but had not established a presence in any urban city. Bowman's missionary work continued until 1881, when he severed his connection with the Universalists and joined the city's spiritualism movement. Rev. D.B. Clayton, who had moved to Atlanta from his South Carolina home to assist Bowman, continued services until the summer of 1882. Afterwards there was no active Universalist presence in the city. Also in 1882, the Unitarians began active missionary work in Atlanta that provided Universalists a temporary religious home.

==== Y.P.C.U. missionary work 1895 - 1918 ====
In 1895, emboldened by their apparent success in Harriman, the Y.P.C.U. turned its attention to Atlanta, Georgia. Three ministers were recruited to raise a Universalist church in Atlanta: Rev. Shinn, then the new Y.P.C.U. National Organizer, Rev. D.B. Clayton, who had been involved in the city's initial missionary work, and Rev. McGlauflin, the Y.P.C.U. Southern Missionary and former Harriman pastor. They succeeded and established the First Universalist Church of Atlanta in 1895, with Rev. McGlauflin becoming the first pastor of the new church.

In 1897, to encourage fundraising for a new church building, the Y.P.C.U. pledged to raise $4.00 for each dollar raised by Atlanta's Universalists. The Y.P.C.U. was also instrumental in retiring the $2,500 mortgage on the building lot. On July 15, 1900, the Universalists dedicated a new church building at 16 East Harris Street.

The Y.P.C.U. invested over $16,000 in the Atlanta effort and subsequently transferred the property deed to the Georgia Universalist convention.

Rev. W.H. McGlauflin remained pastor of the Atlanta church for nine years. He resigned in 1904 to become the superintendent of the Universalist churches in Minnesota. After Rev. McGlauflin, most pastorates lasted between one and two years. The only exception was the pastorate of Rev. E. Dean Ellenwood, who served the church from 1905 to 1913.

Despite the growth of Atlanta's population, the Atlanta Universalist congregation remained small.

==== Denouement ====
Driven by the general weakness of Atlanta's two liberal churches, the Unitarians and Universalists merged in 1918. The combined congregation, named the Liberal Christian Church, chose the Unitarian church building on West Peachtree Street as their common home. The Universalist church on East Harris Street was sold in April 1920. The Unitarian-Universalist congregation continued until 1951 when the congregation collapsed.

In 1952, the American Unitarian Association and the Universalist Church of America renewed efforts in Atlanta. A new church called the United Liberal Church was established in 1954 and witnessed rapid growth. The church was later renamed the Unitarian Universalist Congregation of Atlanta.

=== St. Paul, Minnesota ===
Shortly after the dedication of the Atlanta church, at its 1901 Rochester Convention the Y.P.C.U. selected St. Paul, Minnesota, and Little Rock, Arkansas, as their next missionary projects. Like Atlanta, St. Paul had seen earlier Universalist missionary activity that was unable to sustain a permanent presence.

==== Missionary work 1865 - 1879 ====
The First Universalist Society of St. Paul was incorporated in 1865. Rev. Herman A. Bisbee briefly served as the society's first minister before he accepted a call in November 1866 to the Universalist church in nearby St. Anthony, Minnesota. Nonetheless, the First Universalist Society of St. Paul continued to operate.

In June 1866 the society purchased land on Wabasha Street. In October 1867 ground for a new church was broken, and by January 1869 the basement of the building was sufficiently completed to allow services to be held. The building was completed and formally dedicated October 1, 1872. The society, however, was unable to sustain operations. In 1879 the Universalist Register began listing the St. Paul society as dormant.

The Universalist church property was sold in 1881 to the French Catholics, also known as the St. Louis Church. and the St. Paul Universalist society virtually disappeared.

==== Missionary work 1886 - 1893 ====
In early 1886, the society was revived when Rev. L.D. Boynton from Minneapolis conducted Sunday services in an old Baptist church on Wacouta Street two to three times a month. In December in that same year, Rev. W.S. Vail assumed the pastorate of the small St. Paul society. Rev. Vail's seven-year ministry significantly raised the fortunes of the Universalists. Upon Rev. Vail's resignation in November 1893, The Universalist Register yearbook showed that the once moribund society now counted 125 families among its flock.

With Rev. Vail's departure, the society once again experienced a period of near dormancy. From 1895 to 1900, The Universalist Register showed either no minister or simply dropped the society from its inventory of churches. However, based on a review of newspaper announcements in the St. Paul Globe during this period, the Ladies Aid Society of the First Universalist Church continued to hold the small liberal community together.

==== Missionary work 1898 ====
A prelude to another revival of the St. Paul society occurred in the summer of 1898. While on his summer break from his pastorate of the Atlanta Unitarian church, Rev. Vail, the former St. Paul pastor, provided pulpit supply for St. Paul's People's Church. At a reception held for Rev. Vail, over 150 people attended, and there was discussion of formally reorganizing the society. A hopeful sign was that even without a permanent minister, local Universalists had raised a "goodly sum" of money to establish a permanent Universalist presence in the city.

==== Y.P.C.U. missionary work 1901 - 1916 ====
Following the selection of St. Paul as a missionary project, the Y.P.C.U. organ Onward announced on August 6, 1901, that Rev. Henry B. Taylor had accepted the pastorate to the fledgling St. Paul society. Unioners were implored to support this new missionary project. "Unless every member of our Union consecrates himself as a helper by a Two-Cents-a-Week pledge….the good work will not hasten forward as we desire."

During Rev. Taylor's pastorate (1901 – 1908) the Y.P.C.U. provided funds for the minister's salary, helped reduce the churches indebtedness and raised additional funds for the purchase of church property at the corner of Ashland and Mackubin. In 1909 the Y.P.C.U. held their convention at the larger Church of the Redeemer in Minneapolis. The Unioners traveled to St. Paul for the dedication of the new church now under the pastorate of Rev. Thomas S. Robjent.

Over the course of their missionary effort in St. Paul, the Y.P.C.U. contributed more than $16,000.

==== Denouement ====
In 1916, the Y.P.C.U. executive board voted to transfer the oversight of the St. Paul church to the trustees of the Universalist General Convention. The General Convention, in turn, requested that the Y.P.C.U. assume missionary responsibilities for the Los Angeles church in California. This exchange ended the Y.P.C.U. involvement with St. Paul.

=== Little Rock, Arkansas ===
As noted earlier, the Unioners at their 1901 Rochester Convention had selected St. Paul and Little Rock as their missionary projects.

==== Missionary work 1895 - 1901 ====
Five years prior to the Y.P.C.U. intervention in 1896, Rev. Shinn had conducted missionary work in Little Rock. Shinn's missionary work typically focused on establishing Universalist structures such as a Sunday school and Ladies Universalist Society as a prelude to placing a permanent minister. Notices posted in the Daily Arkansas Gazette showed that Universalist Sunday school was regularly held in 1899 in rented space at the Congregational Church at the corner of Eleventh and Main streets.

==== Y.P.C.U. missionary work 1901 - 1915 ====
In 1902, Rev. F.L. Carrier was recruited by the Y.P.C.U. to serve as minister to the Little Rock church At the time the church had 29 members. The Y.P.C.U. also committed to contributing $500 a year to the pastor's salary.

Rev. Carrier held regular Sunday services in the rented space in the Congregational Church on Eleventh and Main until December 1903, when the Congregational Church sold the building to the Universalists. Thereafter, newspaper articles referred to this building as the Universalist Church on Eleventh and Main.

In 1904, Rev. Carrier resigned and was succeeded by Rev. Athalia Lizzie Johnson Irwin, an Arkansas native. Rev. Irwin was born in 1862 to the Baptist faith, but left that denomination by July 1898. Befriending Rev. Q.H. Shinn, she was encouraged to become a Universalist minister. Her first church in Pensacola, Florida, ordained her in 1902. In October 1904, she left her Pensacola church to assume the pastorate in Little Rock.

The Y.P.C.U. continued its financial support by providing money for the minister's salary and $6,000 toward a building fund. In 1905 a small chapel was constructed at the corner of Thirteenth and Center streets. This chapel became known as the Cottage Chapel.

Rev. Athalia L.J. Irwin was a gifted writer and orator. The local newspaper frequently printed summaries of her sermons with titles such as The Idea of Future Punishment and The Hope of Immortality. However, she garnered the most press coverage when she challenged her brother, Rev. M. Gray Johnson, a Baptist minister from Ohio, to a debate in the Cottage Chapel. The five-day debate was an argument for and against the doctrine of Universalism. Debate topics included "The God We Believe In," "The Christ We Would Follow," "The Punishment We Would Escape," and "The Salvation I Will Attain." When debating the topic "The Christ We Would Follow", Rev. Irwin energetically rejected the doctrine of the Trinity "as unreasonable and as something which Christ never meant to imply." She went on to emphasize God's love and that God "wills that not any should perish, but that all should come to a knowledge of the truth as it is in Christ Jesus."

In spite of her many talents, the Little Rock church remained small. When Rev. Irwin departed in September 1908, there were fewer than 40 members. The Universalist State Superintendent Rev. G.E. Cunningham filled the empty pulpit, vowing to remain until a successor was found. Rev. Cunningham continued to provide pastoral services to the small society until he moved to Illinois in late 1912.

Rev. H.C. Ledyard succeeded Cunningham and remained as the pastor for three years, departing in December 1915. Lay members and guest speakers conducted Sunday services for several years. By mid 1919, Sunday services had ceased. The Cottage Chapel, now referred to as the First Universalist Church, was only being used as rental space for third-party events.

==== Denouement ====
By 1922, there was no mention of the First Universalist church in local newspapers. The church property was sold in 1930. In 1950, a new Universalist society was established and became known as the Unitarian Universalist Church of Little Rock.

=== Chattanooga, Tennessee ===
In 1909 the Y.P.C.U. turned its missionary zeal toward Chattanooga, Tennessee, which was the last major church building effort by the youth group.

==== Missionary work 1895 - 1908 ====
As early as 1895 Rev. McGlauflin, the Southern Missionary in Harriman, Tennessee, had visited Chattanooga, but no permanent church was founded. Rev. Q.H. Shinn, who visited Chattanooga just a few months prior to his death in September 1907, launched a new church in that city, chartered with 32 members. For 17 months the new church was without a permanent minister. Atlanta's Rev. E. Dean Ellenwood, the Universalist General Superintendent, Rev. H.W. McGlauflin and other ministers offered temporary preaching services.

In late November 1908, under the direction of McGlauflin, Rev. L.R. Robinson was installed as the joint pastor for the Harriman and Chattanooga churches. Since there was a parsonage in Harriman, that city was selected as the pastor's home.

Robinson was born into a Methodist Episcopal family but came to Universalism through his reading of the Bible. "I found so many Scriptural passages that seemed to clearly teach the final harmony of all souls with God." Robinson requested Universalist literature from the Post Office Mission and later met Rev. H.W. McGlauflin. Encouraged by McGlauflin, Robinson in the fall of 1908 accepted a position to serve the Universalist churches in Harriman and Chattanooga.

==== Y.P.C.U. missionary work 1909 - 1917 ====
Robinson provided Sunday service two times a month in Chattanooga. Under his ministry membership grew and financial obligations were addressed. In February 1910, the Y.P.C.U. selected Rev. L. R. Robinson as their "consecrated missionary" in Chattanooga, and Robinson moved to that city accordingly.

About the time that Robinson was exploring fellowship with the Universalists, Chattanooga became the focal point of a multi-year search for a site to build a church to honor Rev. Q.H. Shinn, who had died in late 1907. Southern Universalists quickly established the Shinn Memorial Association to raise funds for the construction of a church in a southern state to commemorate Shinn's southern missionary work. The selection process continued for several years, with the Y.P.C.U. supporting Chattanooga.

In 1911, four possible locations for the construction of a Shinn Memorial church were discussed at the General Convention: Houston, Texas; Little Rock, Arkansas; Chattanooga, Tennessee and Rocky Mount, North Carolina. At the convention the Y.P.C.U. continued its support for Chattanooga, arguing that it was in this city "where the Union is supporting a promising mission."

On July 7, 1914, it was announced that Chattanooga had been selected at the site for the Shinn Memorial Church. Three weeks later, in a front-page article in the August 1, 1914, edition of Onward, Unioners were implored to "Let the slogan 'Chattanooga and Work' be ours for the coming year." The Y.P.C.U. 'Chattanooga and Work' campaign was designed to raise the thousands of dollars still needed for the Shinn Memorial Church building fund.

Services were first held in the new Shinn Memorial Church in the summer of 1916. The church was dedicated during the 1917 Y.P.C.U. convention held in that city.

With the construction of the new church, one of Shinn's lifetime ambitions was finally realized. In 1917, a School of Evangelism was opened. The goal of the school was to provide ministerial training to those who were unable to attend regular Universalist theological schools. The school continued to operate until the 1930s.

The church also became the headquarters in 1919 for the Southern Universalist Young People's Institute. The institute's summer programs were designed to train workers for service in Sunday schools, young people's societies and missionary work. A year later the Y.P.C.U. turned over its role in the institute to the Universalist's Women's National Missionary Association (WNMA). In 1925 when the pastor of the Chattanooga church, Rev. George A. Gay, moved to Camp Hill, Alabama, he took the institute with him. The institute, however, returned to Chattanooga in 1930.

==== Denouement ====
In spite of starting with a surplus of funds after the church was built, the congregation frequently had financial trouble and had to depend on denominational aid. It had trouble finding and keeping good ministers, and its lay leadership was frequently divided. In its final years, it ignored the interest in establishing a Unitarian fellowship in Chattanooga. By 1951, there were only four active members, and services were suspended. The congregation is last listed in the Universalist Directory for 1956 - 1957.

== Post Office Mission ==
Within three years of its formation in 1892 at their Reading, Pennsylvania, convention, Rev. Shinn urged the Y.P.C.U. to organize a Post Office Mission. The Post Office Mission was designed to supplement the influence of Universalist ministers and the denomination's periodicals. In a front-page article in the February 1895 edition of Onward, it was argued that "The voice of the minister is heard but a few feet from the pulpit, and the message of the denomination through our papers reaches almost exclusively those who are already acquainted with the message, and is even reaching too few of them. To extend the light into the dark places and to proclaim the gospel of our church where hitherto no voice has been raised in its behalf is the sphere of this mission." The Post Office Mission was primarily organized at a local level. Local societies were tasked with identifying names for mailings, with the national organization providing oversight coordination.

Understanding the opportunities inherent in the 1895 Atlanta Cotton Exposition and 1897 Tennessee Centennial Exposition, booths were secured by the Post Office Mission at both events to distribute literature and collect names for the mailing list.

The Atlanta Cotton Exposition coincided with the resumption of missionary work in Atlanta, and the Y.P.C.U. Post Office Mission embarked on a "Shall We Bombard Atlanta?" campaign. "From all over the South people are gathering, and in the month of December the exposition grounds will be thronged. How can we reach this multitude and plant in their minds some seed of Universalist philosophy?" Not only was literature distributed at the exposition booth, but 187 names were also added to the Post Office Mission mailing list.

The Post Office Mission relied on local Y.P.C.U. societies not only to maintain mailing lists but to cover the cost of postage and other distribution expenses. To defray their overall cost, the Y.P.C.U. Post Office Mission relied on the Universalist Publishing House to provide the literature at little or no cost. The cost for the production of the literature was covered by a bequest from the late entertainer and showman, P.T. Barnum, and other donations.

The national-level Post Office Mission leadership encouraged local Unions to maintain literature tables or racks in the vestibules of their churches. Local societies were additionally encouraged to find public places such as railway stations where literature could be made available to the public. Unioners were implored that "through the Post Office Mission everyone who takes up the work becomes a heralder of the truth."

Interest and support for the Y.P.C.U. Post Office Mission had declined by the early 1920s. Contributing to the decline was the continued need for local funds and the inability to concretely measure the Post Office Mission's success. The national-level Post Office Mission Superintendent Clifford R. Stetson noted in October 1920 that "the Post Office Mission could not be measured in definite terms." He went on to recommend that the function of the Post Office Mission, "to sow the seed, trusting that the fruit would follow", be transferred to another department called the Union-at-Large. The Union-at-Large had been formed in 1892 to support Universalist youth in areas where no local Y.P.C.U. chapter had been formed. Following the transfer, the Y.P.C.U. Post Office Mission ceased to exist.

== Decline and merger ==
The 41st annual Y.P.C.U. convention, held in the United Liberal Church of Atlanta, a joint Unitarian-Universalist congregation, was "one of tension and crisis from beginning to end." The youth group faced shrinking membership, increasing deficits, and an uncertain future for Onward, and needed to answer the question of merger with the Unitarian Young People's Religious Union (Y.P.R.U.).

The problem with Onward was addressed by changing its format back to a monthly magazine with a four-page limit focused on news bulletins and less on "abstract articles…little read and little needed".

Action was taken with considerable opposition to change the convention from an annual to a biennial format. In 1933 the Y.P.C.U. had its lowest individual membership of less than 2,000, with fewer than 100 local unions and only 10 junior unions.

Also in the early 1930s Max A. Kapp, president of the Universalist's Y.P.C.U., and Dana Greeley, president of the Unitarian Y.P.R.U., discussed a merger or federation of the two groups. However, no action was taken until the Unitarians made an overt offer to merge in 1935. Opposition was strong within the Y.P.C.U. It was argued that the Unitarian Y.P.R.U was no better equipped to address youth needs. The Universalists voted to defer action for another year. The deferral period actually continued for many years, with no definitive merger action being taken during World War II (1941-1945).

=== Universalist Youth Fellowship (UYF) ===
The Y.P.C.U. continued an internal examination. In 1941 at the poorly attended Y.P.C.U. convention in Oak Park, Illinois, the youth group reorganized as the Universalist Youth Fellowship (UYF). The re-organized youth group introduced several changes. Its membership focus was narrowed to youth between 13 and 25. The new organization would no longer appeal to state unions for funding. Rather, funding would be based on investment income and other funds raised by the Universalist Church of America Unified Appeal.

Manpower demands from World War II significantly diminished the UYF leadership ranks that came primarily from those preparing for the ministry at Tufts College. Work with youth and students understandably came to a virtual standstill. The UYF budget for 1943-1944 was just $3,300.

Despite demurring on the 1935 proposal to merge, the Universalist and Unitarian youth did act jointly. In late 1945 they cooperated on the publication of two small magazine-size digests called Youth for Action that focused on social service. In the fall of 1945, as the bi-monthly publication of Onward came to an end, they also conducted a two-year experiment with a joint publication called The Young Liberal. This post war Universalist–Unitarian publication became a platform supporting relief efforts in devastated European countries. The publication regularly contained appeals to feed starving Czech and Dutch people and photographs of students rebuilding Stalingrad. In 1947 the Universalists withdrew their support from the magazine that then had only 200 subscribers.

The Universalists in that same year turned their attention to the publication of The Youth Leader. The publication changed formats several times but lasted three years beyond the formal merger of the Universalists and Unitarians in 1961.

=== Liberal Religious Youth (LRY) ===
Ten years prior to the merger of the Universalists and Unitarians, the two denominational youth groups took final steps toward merger at a convention held in 1951 at Lake Winnipesaukee in New Hampshire. Three years later, in 1953, the two youth groups completed the merger discussions started in 1935 and formed the Liberal Religious Youth (LRY).

=== Young Religious Unitarian Universalists (YRUU) ===
After the merger in 1961 of the American Unitarian Association and the Universalist Church of America, LRY was re-organized as the Young Religious Unitarian Universalists (YRUU).
