= The Universalist Herald =

Universalist periodical

Universalist Herald is a publication of the Universalist Herald Publishing company. "Universalist Heritage and Spirit Today" and "The Oldest Continuously Published Liberal Religious Periodical in North America" are the subtitles of the modern edition.

== Overview ==
Founded in 1847 as the Religious Reformer by C. F. R. Shehane of Wetumpka, Alabama. Beginning January 1, 1850, it became The Universalist Herald and was edited by John Crenshaw Buruss. For many years it was strictly a regional publication, serving the Universalist Church of America in Southeastern United States.

In 1896, John M. Bowers purchased and moved the paper to Canon, Georgia, and remained as publishing editor to 1911. From 1911 to 1991, it continued to be published in Canon, Georgia, under an arrangement with the Georgia Universalist Convention, serving as a regional oriented periodical. There was a succession of local editors, notably Nellie Mann Opdale, Argyle E. Houser, and Haynie Summers. Then it began to shift its focus away from regional interests with editor William Balkan from 1985 to 1991, followed by Vernon Chandler and then Justin Lapoint. From 2004 to 2012, the editor was Rich Koster, a retired minister and former truck driver who still writes with the pen name Raven. The most recent editor is David Damico of LeRoy, New York, a member of First Universalist Church of Rochester, New York, and a college professor of graphic design.

The Herald's main church connection was the Universalist Church of America, and then since 1961 with the Unitarian Universalist Association of Churches. It has a broader outlook and has subscribers from all over the U.S. and around the world. The corporate office is in Seven Springs, North Carolina, and the business office is in Dorchester, Massachusetts.

== Board of Directors ==
The Universalist Herald is published quarterly, is owned by the Universalist Herald Publishing Company, and is governed by a Board of Directors (as of 2023)

- David Damico - Editor (LeRoy, NY)
- Rev. Michael Barnett (Beacon, NY)
- Jennifer Gibson (Mansfield, Ohio)
- Rich Koster (Kentucky) (former editor)
- John Nichols (Santa Paula, CA)
- Doug Shaheen - Business Manager (Milton, MA)

== Editors ==
The table below lists the editors for the Universalist Herald. In some cases, information on editors and dates have not been sufficiently validated to be included in the table.

Editor	Years	Comments	Location
Rev. C.F.R. Shehane	1847 - 1849	Founder/editor of the Religious Reformer.	Wetumpka, Alabama
Rev. John C. Burruss	1850 - 1896	Purchased paper, changed name to Universalist Herald and moved publication location	Notasulga, Alabama Montgomery, Alabama
Rev. John Bowers	1896 - 1910	Purchased paper and moved publication location to Canon, Georgia	Canon, Georgia
Rev. Athalia Irwin	1911 - 1913	Moved to Riverside, CA to assume pastorate First Universalist Church	Canon, Georgia
Alexander S. Arnold	1913 - 1914	About the paper: “Its message is one of hope for mankind. It teaches the victory of good over evil in time and in eternity. It advocated a good destiny for all men and bases its doctrine upon the Bible, human reason and the nature of God.”	Canon, Georgia
Rev. Elton Wilson	1914 - 1916		Canon, Georgia
A.J. Owens	1916 - 1917		Canon, Georgia
Rev. John W Rowlett	1917 - 1924	Also, Superintendent of Georgia Universalist Churches	Canon, Georgia
Information Pending	1925 - 1932	Additional research required	
Rev. Nellie Mann Opdale	1932 - 1941	Past president of Georgia Conference of Universalist Churches. Died.	Canon, Georgia
Rev. Eva Warner	1941 - ????	Became editor upon death of Opdale, Research pending on dates	Canon, Georgia
Rev. W.R. Bennett	1948 - 1954	Superintendent of Universalist Churches in South Carolina, Georgia, and Florida	Canon, Georgia
John M. Schofield	195x - ????	Research pending on dates	Canon, Georgia
Rev. Argyle E. Houser	1961 - 1963	Research pending to confirm dates	Canon, Georgia
Haynie Summers	1965 - 1895	Member of Harmony Universalist Church, Senoia, GA. Died.	Canon, Georgia
William H. (“Bill”) Balkan	1985 - 1991	Became editor upon death of Haynie Summers	Canon, Georgia
Vernon Chandler	1991 - 1998		Pending research
Rev. Justin Lapoint	1999 - 2001		Pending research
Rich Koster (Raven)	2001 - 2012		Pending research
David Damico	2013-present		LeRoy, New York
