= Charlotte, Maine =

Town in Maine, United States

- Town
- Seal

- Location within Maine Location within the United States
- Coordinates: 45°00′46″N 67°15′18″W
- Country: United States
- State: Maine
- County: Washington

Area
  - Total: 33.75 sq mi (87.41 km^{2})
  - Land: 30.99 sq mi (80.26 km^{2})
  - Water: 2.76 sq mi (7.15 km^{2})
- Elevation: 115 ft (35 m)

Population (2020)
  - Total: 337
  - Density: 11/sq mi (4.2/km^{2})
- Time zone: UTC-5 (Eastern (EST))
  - Summer (DST): UTC-4 (EDT)
- ZIP code: 04666
- Area code: 207
- FIPS code: 23-12175
- GNIS feature ID: 582405
- Website: charlotteme.org

Charlotte is a town in Washington County, Maine, United States. The town was named for Charlotte Holland Vance (1826–1918), the daughter of legislator William Vance. The population was 337 at the 2020 census.

== Geography ==
According to the United States Census Bureau, the town has a total area of 33.75 square miles (87.41 km^{2}), of which 30.99 square miles (80.26 km^{2}) is land and 2.76 square miles (7.15 km^{2}) is water.

== Demographics ==
Historical population
Census	Pop.	Note	%±
1830	557		—
1840	666		19.6%
1850	718		7.8%
1860	611		−14.9%
1870	467		−23.6%
1880	489		4.7%
1890	381		−22.1%
1900	315		−17.3%
1910	290		−7.9%
1920	289		−0.3%
1930	250		−13.5%
1940	292		16.8%
1950	252		−13.7%
1960	260		3.2%
1970	199		−23.5%
1980	300		50.8%
1990	271		−9.7%
2000	324		19.6%
2010	332		2.5%
2020	337		1.5%
U.S. Decennial Census

=== 2010 census ===
As of the census of 2010, there were 332 people, 148 households, and 92 families living in the town. The population density was 10.7 inhabitants per square mile (4.1/km^{2}). There were 256 housing units at an average density of 8.3 per square mile (3.2/km^{2}). The racial makeup of the town was 94.0% White, 3.0% Native American, and 3.0% from two or more races. Hispanic or Latino of any race were 0.9% of the population.

There were 148 households, of which 23.6% had children under the age of 18 living with them, 50.0% were married couples living together, 6.8% had a female householder with no husband present, 5.4% had a male householder with no wife present, and 37.8% were non-families. 31.1% of all households were made up of individuals, and 10.9% had someone living alone who was 65 years of age or older. The average household size was 2.24 and the average family size was 2.79.

The median age in the town was 50 years. 21.1% of residents were under the age of 18; 4.4% were between the ages of 18 and 24; 19.5% were from 25 to 44; 37.8% were from 45 to 64; and 16.9% were 65 years of age or older. The gender makeup of the town was 50.0% male and 50.0% female.

=== 2000 census ===
As of the census of 2000, there were 324 people, 134 households, and 97 families living in the town. The population density was 10.4 inhabitants per square mile (4.0/km^{2}). There were 249 housing units at an average density of 8.0 per square mile (3.1/km^{2}). The racial makeup of the town was 99.69% White, and 0.31% from two or more races. Hispanic or Latino of any race were 0.31% of the population.

There were 134 households, out of which 24.6% had children under the age of 18 living with them, 61.9% were married couples living together, 4.5% had a female householder with no husband present, and 27.6% were non-families. 24.6% of all households were made up of individuals, and 11.9% had someone living alone who was 65 years of age or older. The average household size was 2.42 and the average family size was 2.80.

In the town, the population was spread out, with 22.2% under the age of 18, 7.1% from 18 to 24, 25.9% from 25 to 44, 28.7% from 45 to 64, and 16.0% who were 65 years of age or older. The median age was 43 years. For every 100 females, there were 95.2 males. For every 100 females age 18 and over, there were 98.4 males.

The median income for a household in the town was $30,391, and the median income for a family was $32,411. Males had a median income of $26,250 versus $20,750 for females. The per capita income for the town was $13,283. About 9.3% of families and 12.8% of the population were below the poverty line, including 14.5% of those under age 18 and 3.5% of those age 65 or over.
