= First Universalist Church (Atlanta) =

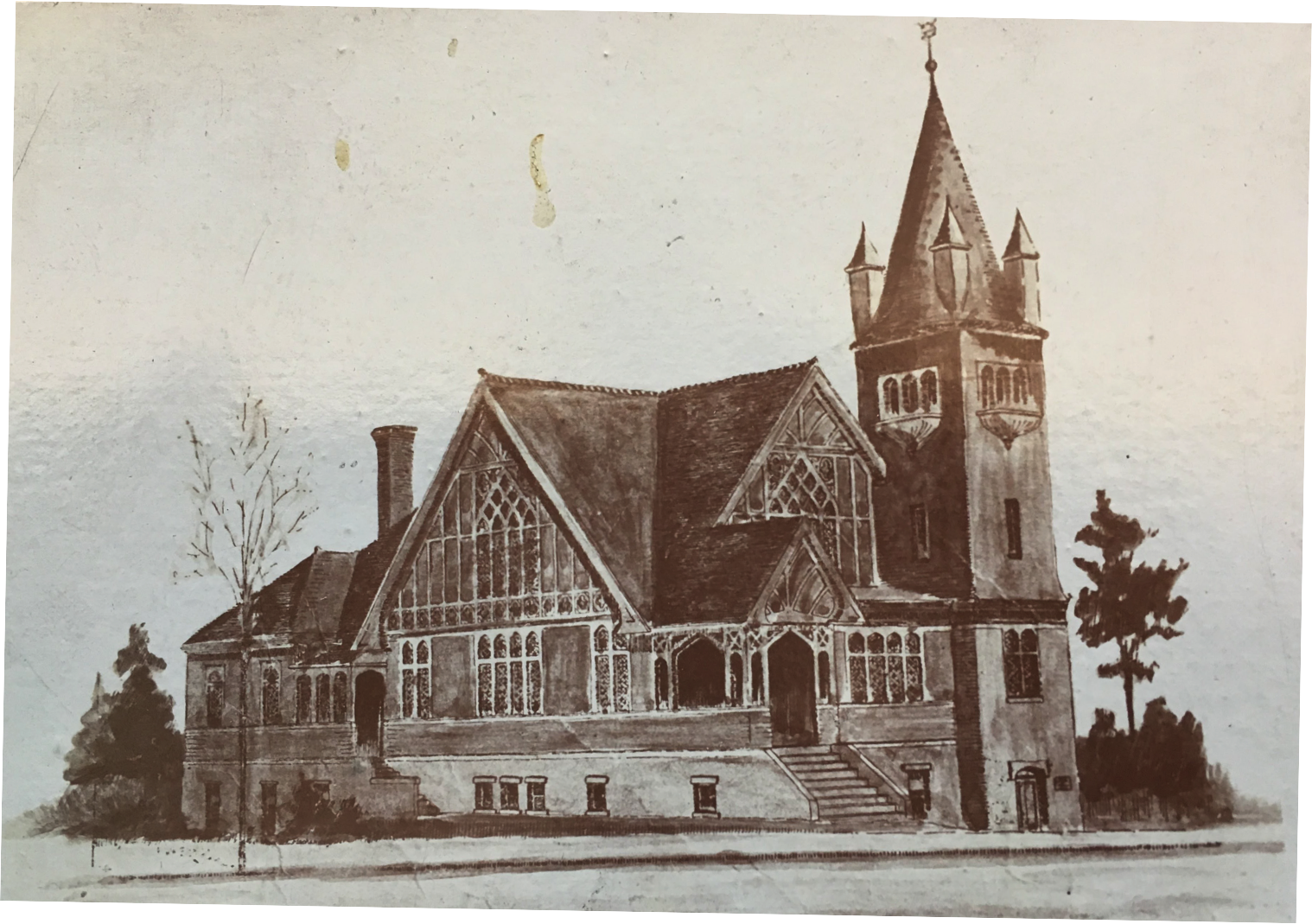
- First Universalist Church
- First Universalist Church
- 33°45′39″N 84°23′13″W
- Location: 16 East Harris Street, Atlanta, Georgia
- Country: United States
- Denomination: Universalist

History
- Founded: 1895
- Founder(s): Rev. Q.H. Shinn, Rev. W.H. McGlauflin, Young People's Christian Union
- Dedicated: Jul 15, 1900

Architecture
- Style: English Gothic
- Construction cost: $12,000
- Demolished: 1920

Specifications
- Materials: Stained Glass Windows: The Sower, The Nativity, The Resurrection.

The First Universalist Church of Atlanta, organized in 1895, re-established a Universalist presence in Atlanta, Georgia. Initial missionary efforts in 1879 were short-lived and failed to establish a permanent presence in the city. With the explicit assistance the Young People's Christian Union, this second missionary effort enabled the Universalists to sustain their presence and construct a church building on East Harris in 1900. The Universalists occupied the church until 1918 when they merged with Atlanta's Unitarians.

The combined churches selected the Unitarian church on West Peachtree Street as their collective home. The combined church known by several names over the next three decades collapsed in 1951.

== History ==
=== Universalist Churches in Georgia ===
At the start of 1879, the Universalists in Georgia had a statewide rural presence of 10 churches with a total membership of 236. In the summer of that same year, Rev. William Clayton Bowman attempted to establish an urban Universalist presence in Atlanta.

Born in 1833 in the mountain region of North Carolina, W.C. Bowman had limited access to both formal education and regular religious services. His exposure to religion came from itinerant Methodist, Baptist and Dunker preachers and revival exaltations to go to the 'mourner's bench' and 'seek religion.' Bowman, however, found more doubt than religion. He rejected the doctrine of endless punishment. "I still held to the Bible as the infallible word of God, but it was redeemed in my mind from the horrible meanings given to it by orthodoxy." Bowman self-converted to universalism.

=== First Missionary Effort in Atlanta ===
In July 1879, Bowman held several Universalist services in the Hall of Representatives in the Georgia Capitol Building in Atlanta. Later services were regularly held at the Georgia Academy of Science on Mitchell Street. In October 1880, he was re-elected pastor of the city's Universalist church. Also in 1880, his Atlanta church was listed in the inventory of Georgia's Universalist churches showing a membership of 11 families.

Rev. D.B. Clayton, a South Carolina itinerant Universalist minister, moved to Atlanta in 1890 to assist Bowman and publish the newly founded Atlanta Universalist newspaper.

By early 1881, the same doubt that drew Bowman from orthodox religion to Universalism drew him to the spiritualism. Bowman severed his connection with the Universalist church and began leading services at the Liberal and Spiritual Church. Bowman continued his connection with the Liberal and Spiritual Church until July 1883 when he left Atlanta for Cincinnati.

Following Bowman's departure from the nascent Universalist church, Rev. Clayton sporadically held Sunday services until the summer of 1882, after which the Universalist activities in Atlanta ceased.

Just as the Universalist missionary effort was ending in Atlanta, the Unitarians were starting their efforts to establish a church in Atlanta. By March 1883, the Unitarians had organized the Church of Our Father. This liberal church provided former members of Bowman's Universalist church a temporary home until the Universalists could resume their own missionary work in the city.

=== Second Missionary Effort in Atlanta ===
In October 1893, Universalist missionary work resumed in Atlanta with an announcement in the local paper stating that "Rev. Q.H. Shinn, the National Evangelist of the Universalist Church will visit the city for ten days. The Unitarians offered Rev. Shinn use of their church to hold services."

Rev. Quillen Hamilton Shinn was born in 1845 and fellowshipped in the Vermont Convention. In his early career, he preached on a circuit that included Canada and Nebraska as well as holding the pastorate in several New England churches. In 1891 he committed himself exclusively to itinerant missionary work. More significantly for the resumption of missionary work in Atlanta, in 1893 the Universalist's Young People's Christian Union (Y.P.C.U.) elected Rev. Shinn to be their national organizer.

The Young People's Christian Union was organized in 1889 and adopted missionary work as its main focus.

In February 1895, in order to raise a Universalist congregation, Rev. Shinn and Rev. D.B. Clayton joined Rev. McGlauflin, the Y.P.C.U. Southern Missionary, to conduct a series of revival meetings in Atlanta. The announcement in the local papers of the weeklong revival revealed the difficulties the Universalist's message of universal salvation faced in a community holding orthodox religious views on sin and eternal damnation. The February 15 headline in The Atlanta Constitution read, "It’s Not Infidelity. Rev. Q.H. Shinn, Universalist, Defends His Church and Creed."

The Universalists were undeterred. The November 1895 issue of Onward, the Y.P.C.U. magazine, a front-page article declared, "On to Atlanta! The ground is broken at Atlanta, Ga. The die is cast. The Rubicon crossed. We have put our hand to the plough, there is no turning back now." The Universalists continued their missionary efforts. In April 1896, Rev. McGlauflin resigned his pastorate at the Grace Universalist Church in Harriman, Tennessee, an earlier Y.P.C.U. missionary project. He moved to Atlanta, relocated the headquarters of the Y.P.C.U. Southern Missionary to that city and assumed the pastorate of the Universalist church. By 1900, membership in the church had risen to just over 100 and sufficient funds had been collected to build a church at 16 East Harris Street. The church was dedicated on July 15, 1900.

== Christianity Questioned ==
Shortly after the dedication of the new church building, the Christian bona fides of Atlanta's Universalists (and Unitarians) was challenged by religious fervor born in the dawn of a new century from Christians in Great Britain.

To usher in the twentieth century, the Federation of Free Churches in Great Britain embraced the idea of a religious revival called the National Simultaneous Mission. The idea caught the imagination of Christians in the United States who envisioned a coast-to-coast, simultaneous revival "born in prayer and the preaching of the old-fashioned Gospel and carried forward in trusting dependence on the Holy Spirit." A Central Committee of Christian leaders was formed in New York. On February 8, 1903, the New York Central Committee called for a nationwide Gospel Campaign.

Atlanta's Christian ministers responded enthusiastically. On February 27, Atlanta pastors from all denominations, including Rev. McGlauflin from the Universalist Church and Rev. Langston from the Unitarian church, gathered to coordinate activities. The next day, The Atlanta Constitution carried an article with the headline, "Plans Complete for Religious Revival" stating that two prominent Universalists, Rev. F.A. Bisbee and Rev. A.A. Ross, would participate.

Two days later, strong opposition was voiced regarding the participation of Universalists and Unitarians. Rev. G. Campbell Morgan, a prominent British-born evangelical who had recently moved to Massachusetts, shocked an audience of 2,200 people in an impassioned speech stating, "I can not and will not enter into any alliance with men whose creed denies the essential elements of salvation."

Rev. Len G. Broughton, the fundamentalist minister of Atlanta's Baptist Tabernacle, added his voice to the opposition. Although there were ministers who supported the Universalists and Unitarians, in the end, both denominations were excluded from the gospel campaign.

On the same day as the official opening of the gospel campaign, Rev. McGlauflin preached at his church, "When St. Paul was once thrown into prison those responsible for the act regretted it afterward and sent him word that it would be agreeable if he would quietly leave by a side door which they would leave open for him. He said, ‘No.’ If they wish me to leave let them come and openly set me free. I shall follow the apostolic example."

== Merger with Unitarians and Collapse ==
In February 1918 the Universalists elected to merge with Atlanta’s Unitarians. The merger was announced in a February 23, 1918 article in The Atlanta Constitution. "The Unitarian and Universalists of Atlanta will meet in public worship at the Unitarian Church, 301 West Peachtree street, tomorrow morning at 11 o'clock. This is the first meeting under a temporary merger of the two congregations which is planned to last for the duration of the war. Rev. T.B. Fisher, the retiring minister of the Universalist church, will preach on 'The Larger Destiny.' All friends are cordially invited."

The merger of the two denominations, however, continued long after the conclusion of the war in November 1918.

Once combined, the Unitarians and Universalists renamed their joint church the Liberal Christian Church. The Universalist church building on East Harris Street was sold in April 1920 for $20,000 (~$236,532 in 2024) and the proceeds were set aside to assist the newly federated congregation.

The merger continued until 1951 when the combined church was engulfed in controversy regarding accusations of communist sympathizing and racial segregation. The national organizations for both the Universalist Church of America and the American Unitarian Association withdrew support for the federated church. The American Unitarian Association, which held the property deed, sold the building in 1951. The church officially disbanded.

== Renewed Efforts in Atlanta ==
Following the sale of the church building and the disbanding of the original congregation, the Universalist Church of America and the American Unitarian Association coordinated efforts to raise a new liberal church in Atlanta. Rev. Glenn O. Canfield was dispatched to the city in early 1952. He successfully regrouped several former members and attracted new members and re-chartered the United Liberal Church. In 1966, the church changed its name to the Unitarian Universalist Congregation of Atlanta (UUCA).

=== Universalist Church Ministers ===
Minister	From	To	Comments
Rev. William Clayton Bowman	Sep 1879	Jan 1882	Rev. W.C. Bowman organized the first Universalist church in Atlanta. He never established a permanent church building. He left the Universalist movement to join the Liberal Spiritualist movement.
Rev. Daniel Bragg Clayton	May 1882	Feb 1885	Rev. D.B. Clayton along with Rev. Q.H.Shinn provided infrequent Sunday services.
Rev. Quillen Hamilton Shinn	Oct 1893	Oct 1895	After a hiatus of nearly eight years, Rev. Q.H. Shinn re-started efforts to establish a Universalist society in Atlanta.
Rev. William Henry McGlauflin	Oct 1895	Feb 1904	Rev. W.H. McGlauflin resigned to become the regional superintendent of the Universalist churches in Minnesota.
Rev. Clarence J. Harris	Jan 1904	Mar 1905	Rev. Harris resigned to accept a call from the State Convention of Pennsylvania, at the solicitation of the General Convention, to be pastor of the movement at Alleghany and Pittsburgh.
Rev. Paul Tyner	May 1905	Jun 1905	Rev. Tyner was called to serve until the end of the new church year (July 1). The church was then closed for the summer months (July – August).
Rev. Everett Dean Ellenwood	Dec 1905	Apr 1913	Rev. E. Dean Ellenwood resigned to accept a call to the Washington Street M.E. Church in Elgin, IL.
Rev. Fred Amos Line	Apr 1913	Oct 1915	Rev. Fred A. Line resigned to accept a call at the church in South Weymouth, MA.
Rev. John Wesley Rowlett	Nov 1915	Sep 1916	Rev. John W. Rowlett provided temporary pulpit services.
Rev. Thomas Burr Fisher	Oct 1916	Jan 1918	Rev. T. B. Fisher was the last minister of the First Universalist Church. The Atlanta Universalists and Unitarians locally merged to form the Liberal Christian Church.
