= Unitarian Universalism =

Non-creedal liberal religious movement

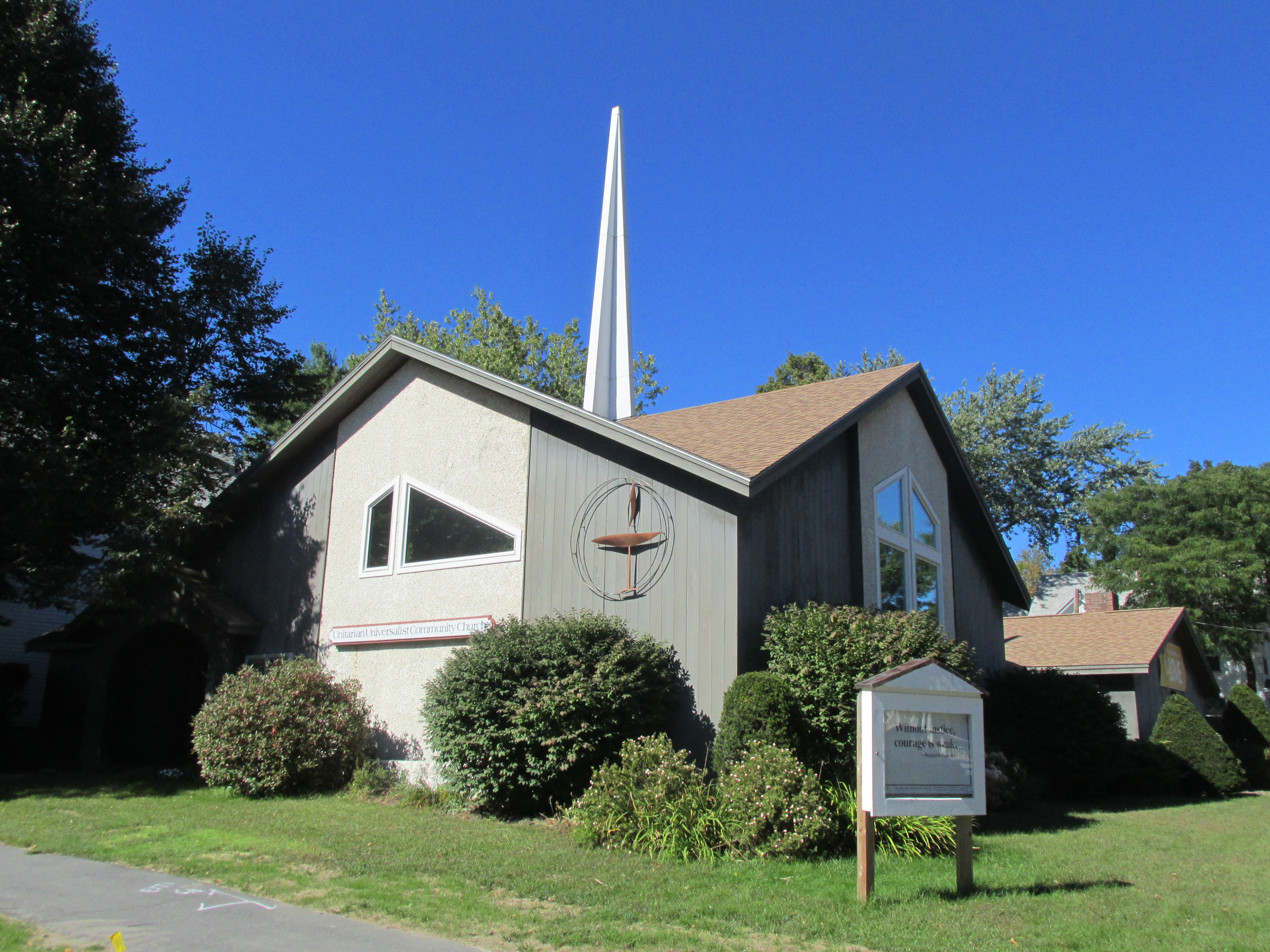
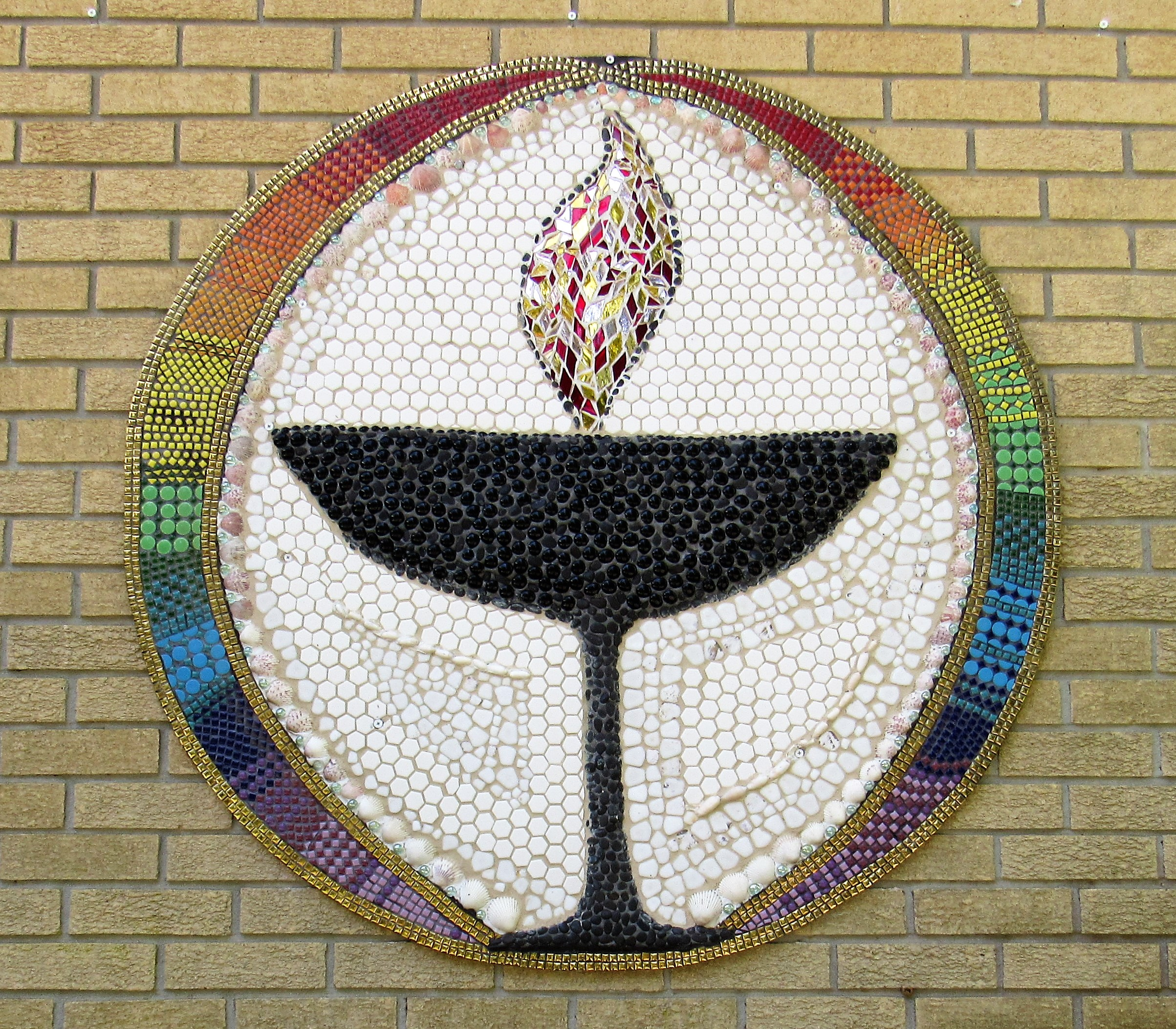
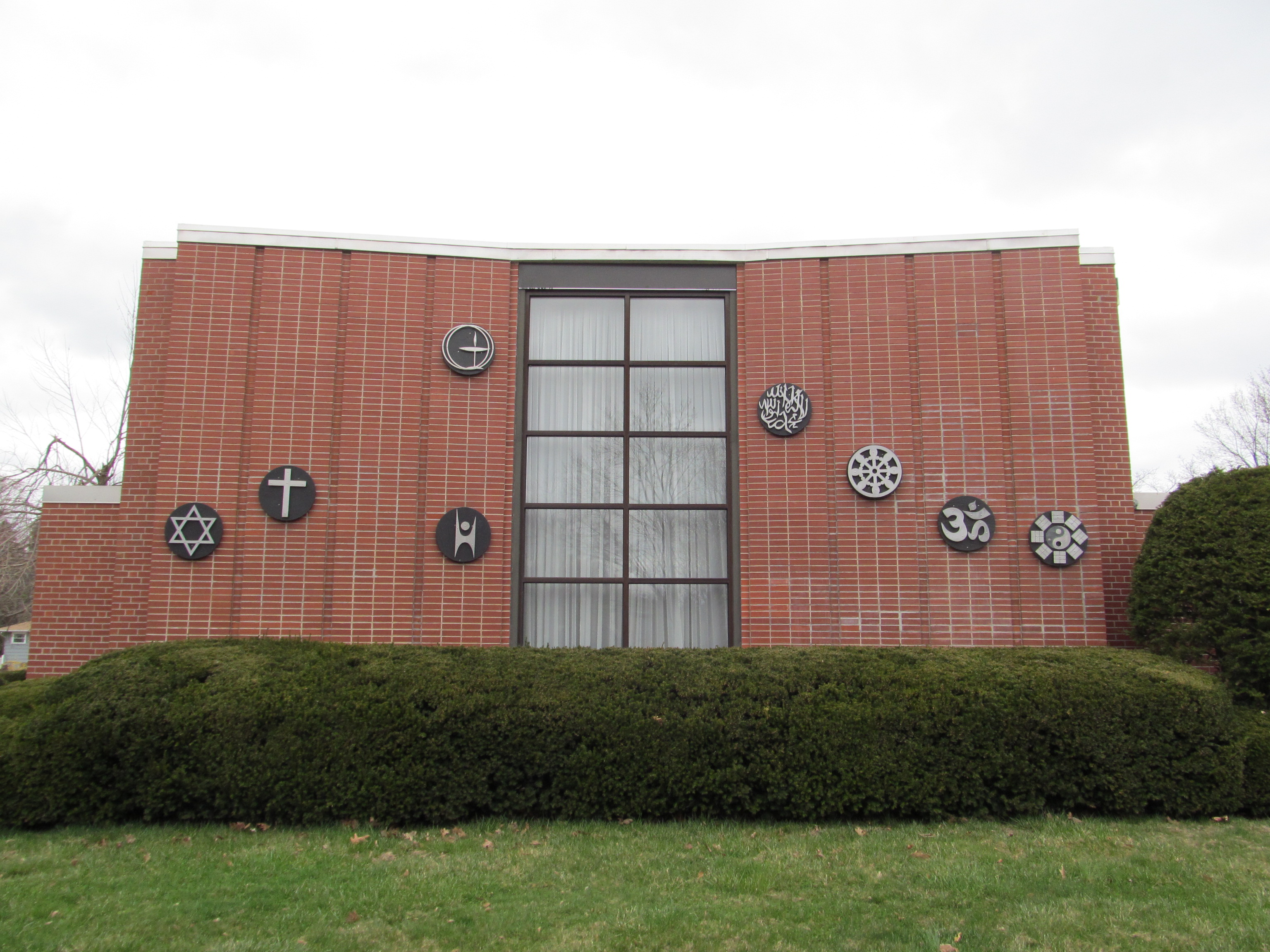
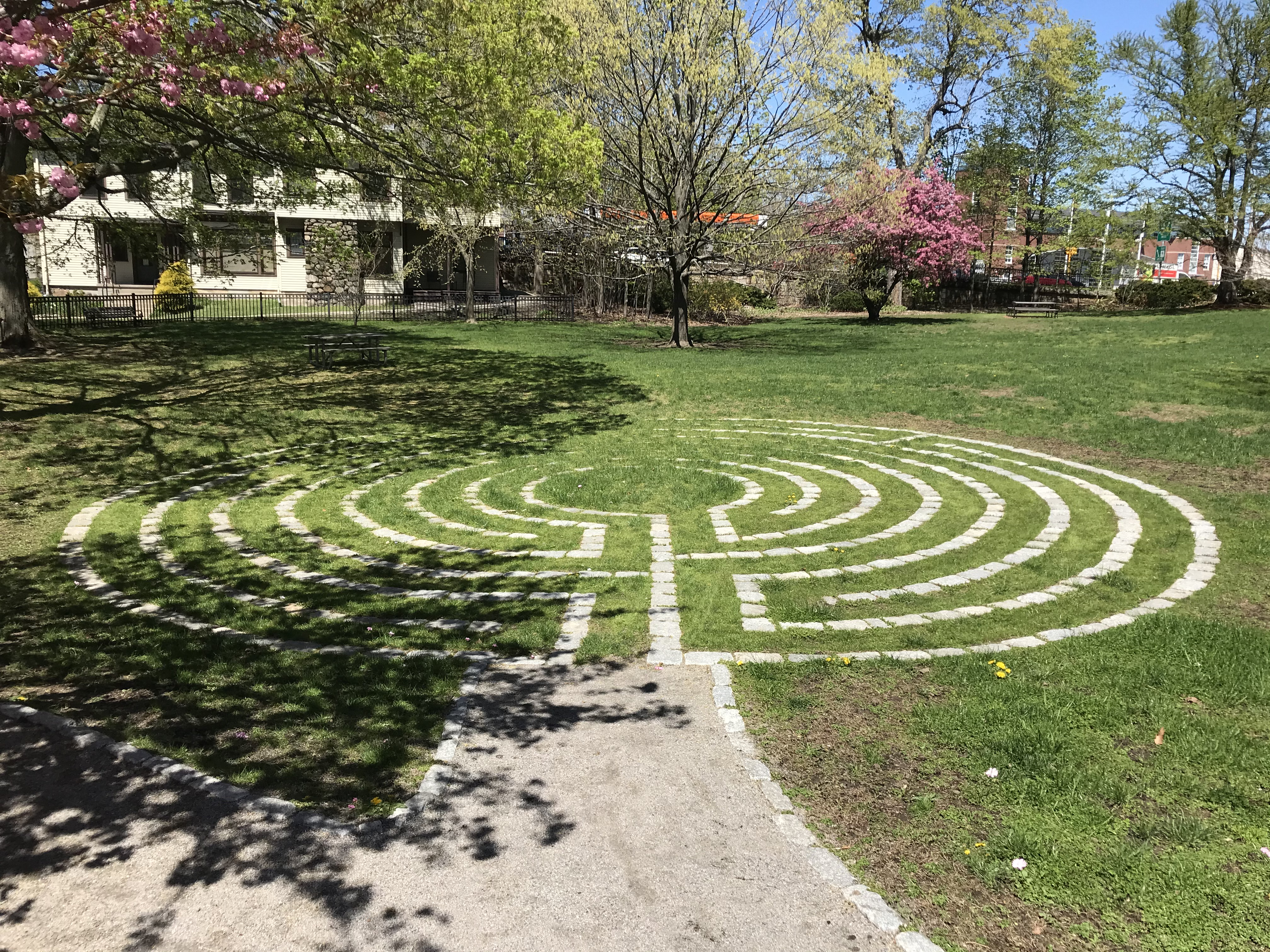
- From left to right, top to bottom: UU meeting house in Augusta, ME.; Mosaic rendition of the flaming chalice, which is the tradition’s most widely used symbol, in Pensacola, FL; Pluralist display of religious symbols at the Unitarian Universalist Church of Worcester, MA; Meditative labyrinth at a congregation in Massachusetts
- Abbreviation: UUism
- Classification: Inclusivist Liberal religion (Unitarian, Universalist)
- Scripture: officially none
- Theology: Egalitarian (including Liberal Christian, Liberal Pluralist, Liberationist, Omnist, and Syncretic)
- Founder: Members of the American Unitarian Association and the Universalist Church of America via consolidation
- Origin: May 1961
- Number of followers: ≈1.4 million identify with Unitarian Universalism in the U.S.A. (2025); 152,958 members and religious education enrollees (≈9% of American UUs) in the UUA (2024)

Unitarian Universalism (UUism or UU) is a liberal religious tradition characterized by its commitment to theological diversity, inclusivity, and social justice. Unitarian Universalists do not adhere to a single creed or doctrine. Instead, they are unified by shared covenants across congregations based on foundational values and principles centered on love and pluralistic worship.

The beliefs of individual Unitarian Universalists range widely and are often contextual to the congregation. The development of Unitarian Universalism can be traced back to Radical Protestantism and Christian primitivist movements through the Unitarian and Christian Universalist traditions. Contemporary Unitarian Universalists may draw upon diverse theological and philosophical thought, including agnosticism, atheism, Buddhism, Christianity, Hinduism, Islam, Judaism, New Age, neopaganism, nontheism, religious humanism, Sikhism, Taoism, and teachings of the Baháʼí Faith, among others.

Worship can take place in churches, fellowships, congregations, and societies. Unitarian Universalists maintain a deep regard for intellectual freedom and inclusive love. Congregations and members seek inspiration and derive insight from all major world religions and therefore do not have an official, unified corpus of sacred texts. There are, however, texts unique to its tradition that are commonly appreciated by professed Unitarian Universalists, such as A Chosen Faith by John A. Buehrens and Forrest Church, which has been called "the classic introductory text on Unitarian Universalism," and The Unitarian Universalist Pocket Guide.

The modern Unitarian Universalist Association (UUA) was formed in 1961 through the consolidation of the American Unitarian Association, established in 1825, and the Universalist Church of America, established in 1793. The UUA is headquartered in Boston, Massachusetts, and serves churches mostly in the United States. A group of thirty Philippine congregations is represented as a sole member within the UUA. The Canadian Unitarian Council (CUC) became an independent body in 2002. The UUA and CUC were two of the seventeen members of the now defunct International Council of Unitarians and Universalists (1995–2021). In 2025, 0.4% of American adults, or approximately 1.4 million people, were estimated to identify with Unitarian Universalism (not limited to the UUA denomination) according to the Public Religion Research Institute's Census of American Religion.

== History ==
=== Puritan roots and Congregationalist background ===
Unitarian Universalism was formed from the consolidation in 1961 of two historically separate Christian denominations, the Universalist Church of America and the American Unitarian Association, both based in the United States; the new organization formed in this merger was the Unitarian Universalist Association. At the time of the North American consolidation, Unitarians and Universalists diverged beyond their roots in liberal Christian theology. They draw from a variety of religious traditions. Individuals may or may not self-identify as Christians or subscribe to Christian beliefs. Unitarian Universalist congregations and fellowships tend to retain some Christian traditions, such as Sunday worship with a sermon and the singing of hymns. The extent to which the elements of any particular faith tradition are incorporated into personal spiritual practice is a matter of individual choice for congregants, in keeping with a creedless, non-dogmatic approach to spirituality and faith development.

New England Unitarians evolved from the Pilgrim Fathers' Congregational Christianity, which was based on a literal reading of the Bible. Liberalizing Unitarians rejected the Trinitarian belief in the tri-personal godhead: Father, Son, and Holy Ghost/Spirit. Instead, they asserted a unitary notion of God. In addition, they rejected the doctrine of original sin, moving away from the Calvinism of the Congregationalists.

New England Universalists rejected the Puritan forefathers' emphasis on the select few, the Elect, who were supposed to be saved from eternal damnation by a just God. Instead Universalists asserted that all people will eventually be reconciled with God.

=== Universalism ===
Universalists claim a long history, beginning with several Church Fathers, though some modern scholars question whether these church fathers taught the defining doctrine of Universalism (universal salvation).

This core doctrine asserts that through Christ every single human soul shall be saved, leading to the "restitution of all things" (apocatastasis). In 1793, Universalism emerged as a distinct denomination of Christianity in the United States, eventually called the Universalist Church of America. Early American advocates of universal salvation such as Elhanan Winchester, Hosea Ballou and John Murray taught that all souls would achieve salvation, sometimes after a period resembling purgatory. Christian Universalism denies the doctrine of everlasting damnation, and proclaims belief in an entirely loving God who will ultimately redeem all human beings.

=== Unitarianism ===
According to Spanish physician Michael Servetus, his studies of the Bible led him to conclude that the concept of the Trinity, as traditionally conceived, was not biblical. His books On the Errors of the Trinity and Christianismi Restitutio caused much uproar. Servetus was eventually arrested, convicted of heresy, and burned at the stake in Geneva in 1553.

The term "Unitarian" entered the English language via Henry Hedworth, who applied it to the teachings of Laelio Sozzini and the Polish Socinians. Unitarian churches were formally established in Transylvania and Poland (by the Socinians) in the second half of the 16th century. There, the first doctrines of religious freedom in Europe were established (in the course of several diets between 1557 and 1568, see Edict of Torda) under the jurisdiction of John Sigismund, King of Hungary and Prince of Transylvania, the only Unitarian monarch. The early Unitarian church not only rejected the Trinity, but also the pre-existence of Christ as well as, in many cases, predestination and original sin as put forward by Augustine of Hippo, and the substitutionary atonement of Christ developed by Anselm of Canterbury and John Calvin. There were several different forms of Christology in the beginnings of the Unitarian movement; ultimately, the dominant Christology became psilanthropism: that Jesus was a man, but one with a unique relationship to God.

==== Great Britain ====
Influenced by the Socinian doctrine of the Polish Brethren, the Unitarian minister Samuel Clarke (1675–1729) revised the Book of Common Prayer, removing the Trinitarian Nicene Creed and references to Jesus as God. Theophilus Lindsey also revised the Book of Common Prayer to allow a more tolerant, free Unitarian interpretation. Neither cleric was charged under the Blasphemy Act 1697 that made it an "offense for any person, educated in or having made profession of the Christian religion, by writing, preaching, teaching or advised speaking, to deny the Holy Trinity". The Act of Toleration (1689) gave relief to English Dissenters, but excluded Unitarians. The efforts of Clarke and Lindsey met with substantial criticism from the more conservative clergy and laity of the Church of England. In response, in 1774, Lindsey applied for registration of the Essex House as a "Dissenting place of worship" with the assistance of barrister John Lee. On the Sunday following the registration—April 17, 1774—the first congregation of the modern Unitarian denomination discreetly convened in the provisional Essex Street Chapel. In attendance were Lee, Joseph Priestley and the agent of the Massachusetts Colony, Benjamin Franklin. Priestley also founded a reform congregation, but, after his home was burned down in the Priestley Riots, fled with his wife to America, where he became a leading figure in the founding of the church on American soil.

Once laity and clergy relaxed their vehement opposition to the Doctrine of the Trinity Act 1813, which finally allowed for protections of dissenting religions, the British and Foreign Unitarian Association was founded in 1825. It has its headquarters in Essex Hall, successor to Lindsey's Essex House. Two that have been significant in national life are the Cross Street Chapel in Manchester and, Newington Green Unitarian Church in north London. Unitarian congregations in Britain meet under the auspices of the General Assembly of Unitarian and Free Christian Churches. There are 170 communities of Unitarians across Britain. The Chief Officer of the British Unitarians was Liz Slade as of 2024.

==== United States ====
In the United States, the Unitarian movement began primarily in the Congregational parish churches of New England, which were part of the state church of Massachusetts. These churches, whose buildings may still be seen in many New England town squares, trace their roots to the division of the Puritan colonies into parishes for the administration of their religious needs. In the late 18th century, conflict grew within some of these churches between Unitarian and Trinitarian factions. In 1805, Unitarians gained key faculty positions at Harvard. In 1819 William Ellery Channing preached the ordination sermon for Jared Sparks in Baltimore, outlining the Unitarian position. The American Unitarian Association was founded as a separate denomination in 1825. By coincidence and unknown to both parties, the AUA was formed on the same day—May 26, 1825—as the British and Foreign Unitarian Association.

In the 19th century, under the influence of Ralph Waldo Emerson (who had been a Unitarian minister) and other transcendentalists, Unitarianism began its long journey from liberal Protestantism to its more pluralist form.

=== Integration, 1825–1961 ===
After the schism in the Congregational Churches that resulted in the founding of the American Unitarian Association in 1825, some of those churches remained within the Congregational fold and became member congregations of the Congregational organization (later the United Church of Christ), while others voted to become Unitarian. Some of the latter eventually became part of the Unitarian Universalist Association (formed in 1961) during a consolidation of the Unitarian and Universalist churches. Universalist churches in contrast followed a different path, having begun as independent congregations beyond the bounds of the established Puritan churches entirely. The UUA and the United Church of Christ cooperate jointly on social justice initiatives such as the Sexuality Education Advocacy Training project.

In 1961, the American Unitarian Association (AUA) was consolidated with the Universalist Church of America (UCA), thus forming the Unitarian Universalist Association (UUA). In the same year, the Canadian Unitarian Council (CUC) formed. The Unitarian Universalist Association (UUA) was given corporate status in May 1961 under special acts of legislature of the Commonwealth of Massachusetts and the State of New York.

In 1998, the Canadian Unitarian Council and Unitarian Universalist Association dissolved their financial accord, although they continue to cooperate. The CUC had come into being at Meadville Lombard Theological School in 1961. However the continual decline of denominational churches and the almost complete failure of the Universalist movement in Canada had caused the formation of the Council to prompt a plan to merge with the UUA. Opposition to Liberal religious freedom relaxed, so that by 2002 it was agreed to increase autonomy and funding. The amalgamation proved troublesome for the Canadians, a small minority largely ignored, with only 45 congregations and 5,200 members—the Americans were insensitive to cultural differences.

== Beliefs and practices ==
=== Diversity of beliefs and scriptures ===
According to the Unitarian Universalist Association, Unitarian Universalism is a religion marked by freedom, reason, and acceptance. As such, Unitarian Universalists practice a non-creedal religion that does not require one to believe in any particular belief or doctrine. Rather than sharing common beliefs, Unitarian Universalists are united by a common history, the affirmation of each person's individual spiritual quest, and a covenant to uphold the community's shared spiritual values. As such, Unitarian Universalists vary greatly in their beliefs, and a plurality of beliefs often defines Unitarian Universalist congregations.

Unitarian Universalists are encouraged to engage in their own unique spiritual journey and to follow their conscience in their beliefs. Unitarian Universalism is seen as compatible with other spiritual paths, and individual Unitarian Universalists are encouraged to engage in their own spiritual journey, whatever the path. Unitarian Universalists are not required to renounce previous faith traditions to join a Unitarian Universalist congregation. As a result, individual practitioners may simultaneously identify as Unitarian Universalists and other faith traditions.

Although Unitarian Universalism has roots in Christian traditions, contemporary Unitarian Universalists in North America view their religion as multifaith and drawing on a variety of religious and secular sources. Unitarian Universalism encourages its members to draw on the world's religions, as well as the words and deeds of prophetic people, for inspiration on their spiritual journeys. Although members are cautioned to be aware of possible cultural appropriation of traditions that do not belong to them, Unitarian Universalists are encouraged to find wisdom in a diverse spectrum of religions, customs, and cultures from around the world.

A Chosen Faith by John A. Buehrens and Forrest Church and The Unitarian Universalist Pocket Guide are texts unique to Unitarian Universalism that are commonly appreciated by followers (although they are not considered official sacred texts, since such a recognition is against Unitarian Universalist principles). The Unitarian Universalist Pocket Guide is produced by the UUA and is a comprehensive introduction to Unitarian Universalism (especially as practiced in the UUA), featuring contributions from a variety of UU writers and being periodically edited by the incumbent UUA president. The Pocket Guide is in its 7th edition as of 2025, and was edited by Sofía Betancourt, who is the 10th President of the UUA.

=== Humanism and beliefs about divinity ===
Although the predecessors of Unitarian Universalism, Unitarianism and Universalism, find their origin in unorthodox beliefs about the nature of the Christian God, modern Unitarian Universalists hold a variety of views about the nature and existence of deity. Most Unitarian Universalist congregations take no formal stance on whether a god or gods exist, leaving it up to individual members to decide for themselves what they believe. Unitarian Universalists may be atheists, agnostics, and theists. Among those Unitarian Universalists who use language of divinity, both monotheism and polytheism are common, and Unitarian Universalists hold a variety of beliefs about the nature of the divine.

The diversity of beliefs about divinity in Unitarian Universalism can be attributed to the influence of religious humanism on the movement in the late nineteenth century. Although Unitarian Universalists believe that anyone can be a Humanist, regardless of their position on the use of the language of divinity, the rise of religious humanism within Unitarian Universalism enables members to further question the existence and nature of the divine by encouraging reason. Fifteen of the thirty-four signers of Humanist Manifesto I were Unitarians and one was a Universalist. Unitarian Universalists were also a significant presence among the signers of Humanist Manifestos II and III.

Today, the majority of Unitarian Universalists in North America identify as Humanists. Although Humanism is seen as an evolving philosophy that recognizes the limits of science and reason, its tenets continue to play a significant role in the thought of Unitarian Universalist congregations. Unitarian Universalist Humanists hold that the naturalism of their Humanism encourages individuals to recognize the awe, beauty, and wonder of the natural world and recognize the interdependence between humans and other beings.

=== Covenant ===
In the absence of shared beliefs, Unitarian Universalists often see their religion as a covenantal (as opposed to a creedal) one. Unitarian Universalists see covenants as the promises that bind congregations, communities, and individuals together. In Unitarian Universalism, covenants are mutual promises among individuals and communities about how they will behave and engage with each other. Covenants help create trust and care among Unitarian Universalists and in their congregations.

Rather than creating things people have to do, covenants in Unitarian Universalist communities foster freedom by clarifying what to expect from one another. In the words of Unitarian Universalist minister Alice Blair Wesley:

...authentic human freedom is of necessity, lawful freedom, and because we receive the possibility of freedom as a gift of the way things are, an authentic covenant is: a glad promise to live freely together, insofar as we are able, in accordance with the laws of reality that make our freedom possible. This is true whether the agreement is between just two, as in a union of marriage, or whether the agreement is among millions, as in a free nation, or whether the agreement is among members who gather to be a free congregation.

The use of covenants in the Unitarian Universalist community dates back to 1646 and the creation of the Cambridge Platform by the Congregational churches of colonial New England, some of whom would later become Unitarians, predecessors of modern Unitarian Universalists. The Platform was the first formal declaration of the principles of church order and governance in colonial North America. Today, many Unitarian Universalist congregations create their own covenants, often called covenants of right relations, to lay out the principles of their congregations formally.

=== Principles ===
In the United States, members of the Unitarian Universalist Association (UUA) covenanted together via the seven Principles and Purposes, formerly a part of Article II of the UUA bylaws. These Principles and Purposes were statements of shared values that Unitarian Universalist congregations agreed to uphold:

1. The inherent worth and dignity of every person;
2. Justice, equity and compassion in human relations;
3. Acceptance of one another and encouragement to spiritual growth in our congregations;
4. A free and responsible search for truth and meaning;
5. The right of conscience and the use of the democratic process within our congregations and in society at large;
6. The goal of world community with peace, liberty, and justice for all;
7. Respect for the interdependent web of all existence of which we are a part.

These principles, first adopted in 1960 and later revised in 1984 and 1985, proved so popular that many Unitarian Universalists came to see them as a wisdom source in and of themselves and a guide for participation in Unitarian Universalist congregations.

In June, 2024, the UUA's General Assembly voted to replace the 7 principles in Article II of the UUA bylaws with a new covenant of 7 values. The central value is love. The other 6 are: interdependence, equity, transformation, pluralism, generosity, and justice.

In Canada, members of the Canadian Unitarian Council affirm the seven principles along with an eighth principle: "Individual and communal action that accountably dismantles racism and systemic barriers to full inclusion in ourselves and our institutions."

In the Philippines, where Unitarian Universalism is much more theistically oriented, member congregations of the Unitarian Universalist Church of the Philippines affirm the seven principles, but with the addition of their own first principle: "There is God. God is love."

=== Justice ===
Unitarian Universalism holds that actions to make the world a better place are more important than what a person actually believes, as espoused by the common slogan in Unitarian Universalist congregations, "Deeds, not creeds." They hold that belief divorced from action does not change the world and that good intentions often lead to a worse situation in the long term. Unitarian Universalist thinkers have long recognized the need to bring belief and action together and encourage their members to go into the larger world and improve it.

Because of this importance of action, Unitarian Universalists have long been involved in social, economic, and environmental justice movements, both through organizations created by Unitarian Universalists and through local, regional, national, and international grassroots organizing. Many Unitarian Universalists see this work as inseparable from their faith and view their participation in justice movements as a deeply important part of it.

Historically, the Unitarian Universalist Association's predecessor movements, Unitarianism and Universalism, saw members involved in abolitionism, women's suffrage, pacifism, temperance, and prison reform. Today, Unitarian Universalists are deeply involved in causes such as racial justice and the Black Lives Matter movement, LGBTQ movements, feminism and women's rights, immigration justice, reproductive rights, climate justice, and economic inequality.

== Worship and practices ==
=== Diversity of practices ===
The Unitarian belief that reason, and not creed, defines the search for truth, and the Universalist belief that God embraces all people equally has led to the current Unitarian Universalist belief that truth and spiritual meaning can be found in all faiths. This is reflected in the wide array of spiritual practices found among Unitarian Universalists today. Many Unitarian Universalist congregations include Buddhist-style meditation groups, Jewish Seder, Yom Kippur and Passover dinners, iftaar meals (marking the breaking of Ramadan fast for Muslims), and Christmas Eve/Winter Solstice services. Children's and youth's religious education classes teach about the divinity of the world and the sanctity of world religions. One of its more popular curricula, Neighboring Faiths (formerly Church Across the Street), takes middle and high school participants to visit the places of worship of many faith traditions including a Hindu temple, a Reform or Orthodox synagogue, and a Catholic church.

There is great variety among Unitarian Universalist congregations, with some favoring particular religious beliefs or forms of worship over others, with many more home to an eclectic mix of beliefs. Regardless of their orientation, most congregations are fairly open to differing beliefs, though not always with various faith traditions represented to the same degree.

=== Diversity of congregations ===
There is a wide variety in how congregations conceive of themselves, calling themselves "churches", "societies", "fellowships", "congregations", or eschew the use of any particular descriptor. Many use the name "Unitarian Universalist", (and a few "Universalist Unitarian"), having gradually adopted this formulation since consolidation in 1961. Others use names that reflect their historic roots by keeping the historical designation "Unitarian" or "Universalist" (e.g. "First Unitarian Church"). A few congregations use neither (e.g. Unity Temple). For some congregations, the name can be a clue to their theological orientation. For others, avoidance of the word "church" indicates a desire to distance itself from traditional Christian theology. Sometimes the use of another term may simply indicate a congregation's lay-led or relatively new status. However, some Unitarian Universalist congregations have grown to appreciate alternative terms such as fellowship and retained them even though they have grown much larger or lost features sometimes associated with their use (such as, in the case of fellowships, a traditionally lay-led worship model).

Also of note is that there are many more people who identify as Unitarian Universalist on surveys than those who attend Unitarian Universalist congregations (by a factor of four in a recent survey), reflecting those who have never joined (and lapsed members) but nonetheless consider themselves part of the Unitarian Universalist movement.

=== Elevator speeches ===
In 2004, UU World magazine asked for contributions of "elevator speeches" explaining Unitarian Universalism. These are short speeches that could be made in the course of an elevator ride to those who knew nothing of the religion. Here are examples of the speeches submitted:

In Unitarian Universalist congregations, we gather in community to support our individual spiritual journeys. We trust that openness to one another's experiences will enhance our understanding of our own links with the divine, with our history, and with one another.

— Jonalu Johnstone, Oklahoma City, Oklahoma

Most Unitarian Universalists believe that nobody has a monopoly on all truth, or ultimate proof of the truth of everything in any one belief. Therefore, one's own truth is unprovable, as is that of others. Consequently, we should respect the beliefs of others, as well as their right to hold those beliefs. Conversely, we expect that others should respect our right to our own beliefs. Several UU's then, would likely hold as many different beliefs. Other beliefs they may hold in common are a respect for others, for nature, and for common decency, leading to a particular caring for the poor, the weak and the downtrodden. As a result, issues of justice, including social justice are held in common among most.

— Gene Douglas, Harrah, Oklahoma

It's a blessing each of us was born; It matters what we do with our lives; What each of us knows about God is a piece of the truth; We don't have to do it alone.

— Laila Ibrahim, Berkeley, California

== Worship and ritual ==
As in theology, Unitarian Universalist worship and ritual are often a combination of elements derived from other faith traditions alongside original practices and symbols. In form, church services might be difficult to distinguish from those of a Protestant church, but they vary widely among congregations.

=== Symbols ===
The most common symbol of Unitarian Universalism is the flaming chalice, often framed by two overlapping rings that many interpret as representing Unitarianism and Universalism (the symbol has no official interpretation). The chalice itself has long been a symbol of liberal religion, and indeed liberal Christianity (the Disciples of Christ also use a chalice as their denomination symbol). The flaming chalice was initially the logo of the Unitarian Service Committee during the Second World War. It was created by Austrian artist Hans Deutsch. The holy oil burning in it is a symbol of helpfulness and sacrifice.

Nevertheless, other interpretations have been suggested, such as the chalice used by the followers of Czech Jan Hus, which was supposedly reverential of Eastern Orthodox traditions; although Hus's early National Church was intrinsically an evangelical Protestant. In some agnostic historiographies the flaming chalice displayed a vague resemblance to a cross in some stylized representations, relying on the sepulchral traditions of the Hospitallers. Many Unitarian Universalist congregations light a chalice at the beginning of worship services. Other symbols include an off-center cross within a circle (a Universalist symbol associated with the Humiliati movement in the 1950s, a group of reformist, liturgically minded clergy seeking to revive Universalism).

Other symbols include a pair of open hands releasing a dove.

=== Services of worship ===
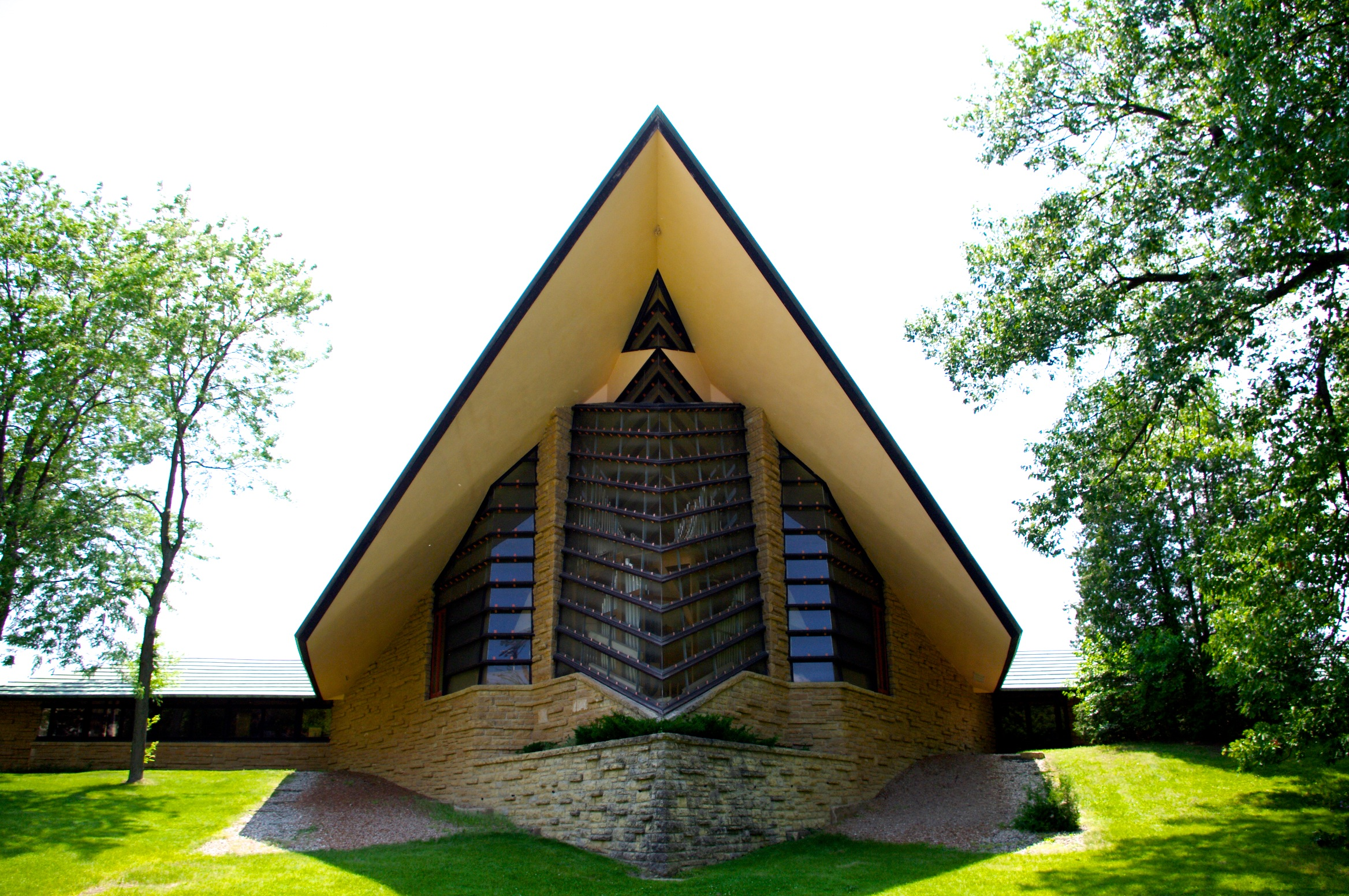
The Unitarian Meeting House designed by Frank Lloyd Wright, Shorewood Hills, Wisconsin

Religious services are usually held on Sundays and most closely resemble the form and format of Protestant worship in the Reformed tradition. Services at a vast majority of congregations follow a structure that focuses on a sermon or presentation by a minister, a lay leader of the congregation, or an invited speaker. Sermons may cover a wide range of topics. Since Unitarian Universalists do not recognize a particular text or set of texts as primary or inherently superior, inspiration can be found in many different religious or cultural texts as well as the personal experiences of the minister.

The service also includes hymn-singing, accompanied by organ, piano, or other available instruments, and possibly led by a song leader or choir. The most recent worship songbook published by the denomination, Singing the Journey contains 75 songs and is a supplement to the older Singing the Living Tradition which contains readings as well. Hymns typically sung in Unitarian Universalist services come from a variety of sources—traditional hymn tunes with new or adapted lyrics, spirituals, folk songs from various cultures, or original compositions by Unitarian Universalist musicians are just a few. Instrumental music is also a common feature of the typical worship service, including preludes, offertory music, postludes, or music for contemplation.

Pastoral elements of the service may include a time for sharing Joys and Sorrows/Concerns, where individuals in the congregation are invited to light a candle or say a few words about important events in their personal lives. Many also include a time of meditation or prayer, led by the minister or service leader, both spoken and silent. Responsive readings and stories for children are also typical. Many congregations also allow for a time at the end of the service, called "talk back", where members of the congregation can respond to the sermon with their own insights and questions, or even disagree with the viewpoint expressed by the minister or invited speaker.

Many Unitarian Universalist congregations no longer observe the Christian sacraments of baptism, communion, or confirmation, at least in their traditional forms or under their traditional names. Congregations that continue these practices under their more traditional names are often federated churches or members of the Council of Christian Churches within the Unitarian Universalist Association (CCCUUA), or may have active chapters associated with the Unitarian Universalist Christian Fellowship or similar covenant groups. "Child dedications" often replace more traditional infant baptisms (such "dedications" are sometimes practiced even in "orthodox" Christian communities that do not baptize infants for theological reasons). Annual celebrations of Water Communion and Flower Communion may replace or supplement Christian-style communion (though many pluralist and Christian-oriented congregations may celebrate or otherwise make provisions for communion on Christian holy days). Confirmation may be replaced by a "Coming of Age" program, in which teenagers explore their individual religious identity, often developing their own credo. After they have completed exploring their spiritual beliefs, they write a speech about it which they then personally deliver to the congregation.

Services can vary widely between congregations, and can incorporate dancing, contemporary music and poetry, readings taken from secular fiction or original works by congregants.

== Politics ==
=== Historical politics of Unitarians and Universalists ===
In the 19th century, Unitarians and Universalists were active in abolitionism, the women's movement, the temperance movement, and other social reform movements. The second women's rights convention was held at the First Unitarian Church of Rochester, New York. Additionally, four Presidents of the United States were Unitarians: John Adams, John Quincy Adams, Millard Fillmore, and William Howard Taft.

=== Politics of Unitarian Universalists ===
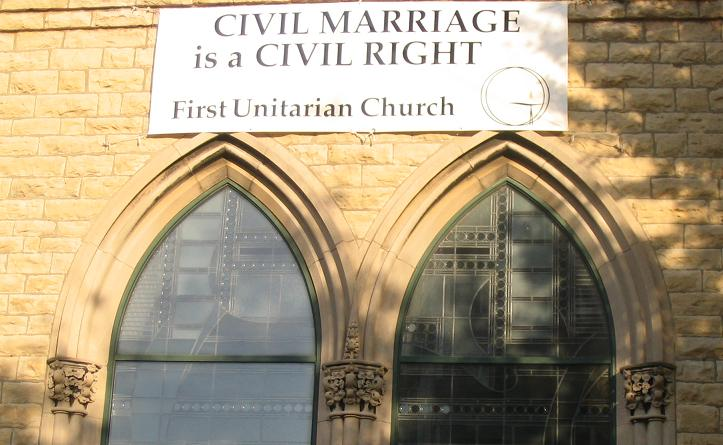
A Unitarian assembly in Louisville, Kentucky

Historically, Unitarian Universalists have often been active in political causes, notably the civil rights movement, the LGBT rights movement, the social justice movement, and the feminist movement. Susan B. Anthony, a Unitarian and Quaker, was extremely influential in the women's suffrage movement. Unitarian Universalists and Quakers still share many principles. It is therefore common to see Unitarian Universalists and Quakers working together. The Unitarian Universalist tradition has included some prominent Christian socialists, such as the American Unitarian minister John Haynes Holmes and the labor leader and Universalist Sarah Bagley. Holmes was also among the founders of both the National Association for the Advancement of Colored People (NAACP) in 1909 and the American Civil Liberties Union (ACLU), chairing the latter for a time. James J. Reeb, a minister at All Souls Church, Unitarian, in Washington, D.C., and a member of the Southern Christian Leadership Conference, was clubbed in Selma, Alabama on March 8, 1965, and died two days later of massive head trauma. Two weeks after his death, Viola Liuzzo, a Unitarian Universalist civil rights activist, was murdered by white supremacists after her participation in the protest march from Selma to Montgomery, Alabama. The Selma to Montgomery marches for voting rights are best known for Bloody Sunday, which refers to March 7, 1965, the most violent of the three marches. The past head of the Unitarian Universalist Association 2001–2009, William G. Sinkford, is African-American, making Unitarian Universalism one of the first traditionally white denominations to be headed by a member of a racial minority.

While political liberals and progressives make up a clear majority of U.S. Unitarian Universalists (particularly in the UUA), Unitarian Universalism aspires to diversity, and officially welcomes congregants regardless of their political views. Politically conservative Unitarian Universalists point out that neither theological liberalism nor the Seven Principles or Shared Values of Unitarian Universalism require decidedly left-leaning politics. There have been calls from groups such as the Fifth Principle Project for more tolerance and understanding of political differences within the UUA in order to avoid alienating politically centrist-leaning or moderate conservative Unitarian Universalists. The former U.S. Secretary of Defense William Cohen is an example of a conservative-leaning Unitarian Universalist. Due to its covenantal commitment to liberal democratic principles and pluralism, however, Unitarian Universalism is generally considered to exclude authoritarian and far-right political ideologies, such as Christian nationalism.

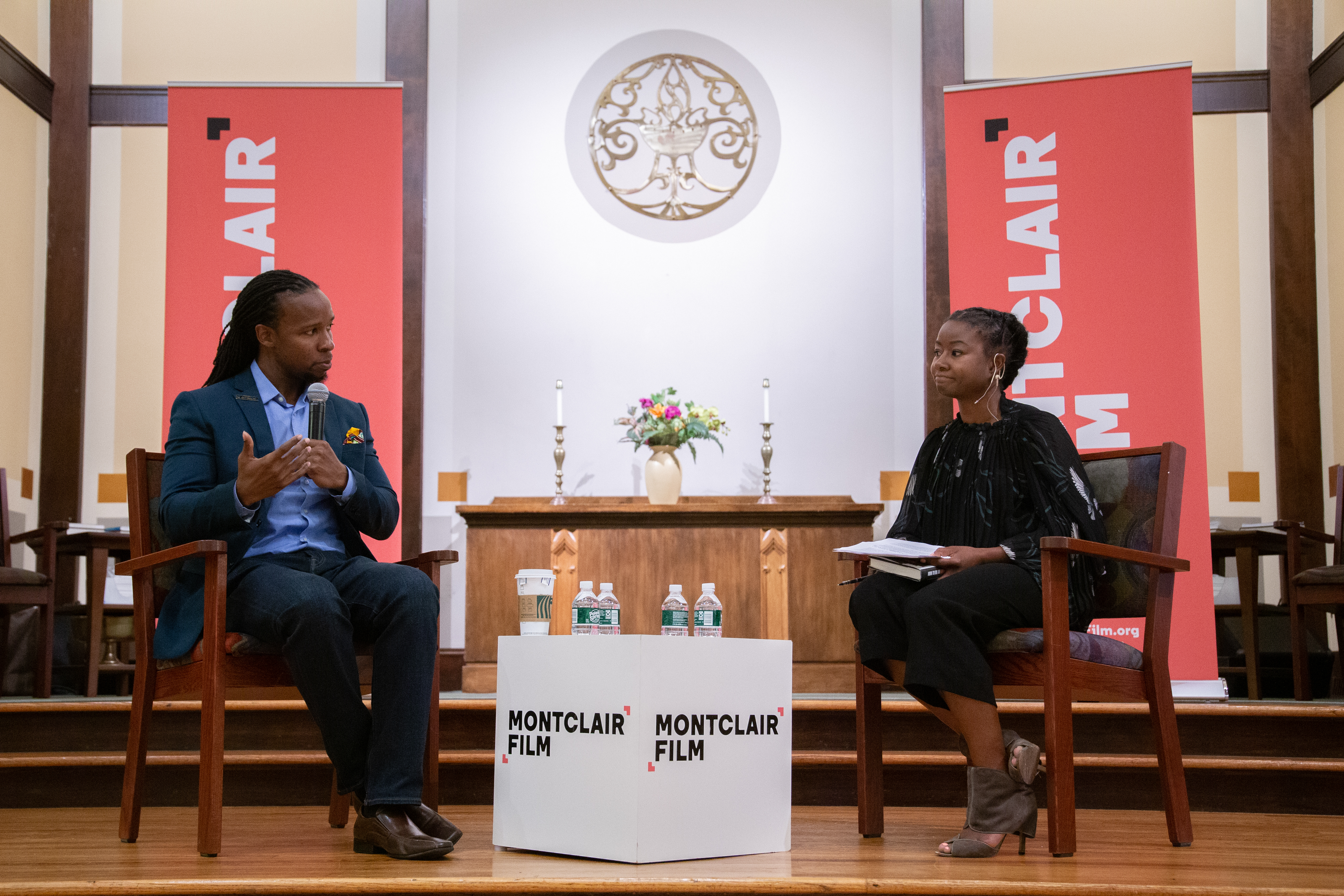
Ibram X. Kendi presenting his new book How to Be an Antiracist at Unitarian Universalist Church located in Montclair, New Jersey, on August 14, 2019

Several congregations have undertaken a series of organizational, procedural and practical steps to become acknowledged as a "Welcoming Congregation": a congregation which has taken specific steps to welcome and integrate gay, lesbian, bisexual & transgender (LGBT) members. Unitarian Universalist ministers perform same-sex unions and now same-sex marriages where legal (and sometimes when not, as a form of civil protest). On June 29, 1984, the Unitarian Universalists became the first major church "to approve religious blessings on homosexual unions." Unitarian Universalists have been in the forefront of the work to make same-sex marriages legal in their local states and provinces, as well as on the national level. Gay men, bisexuals, and lesbians are also regularly ordained as ministers, and a number of gay, bisexual, and lesbian ministers have, themselves, now become legally married to their partners. In May 2004, Arlington Street Church, in Boston, Massachusetts, was the site of the first state-sanctioned same-sex marriage in the United States. The official stance of the UUA is for the legalization of same-sex marriage—"Siding with Love". In 2004 UU minister Debra Haffner of The Religious Institute on Sexual Morality, Justice, and Healing published An Open Letter on Religious Leaders on Marriage Equality to affirm same-sex marriage from a multi-faith perspective. In December 2009, Washington, D.C., Mayor Adrian Fenty signed the bill to legalize same-sex marriage for the District of Columbia in All Souls Church.

Unitarian Universalists for Polyamory Awareness engages Unitarian Universalist ministers and other leaders to educate them on polyamory. At the 2015 UUA General Assembly, the Association's non-discrimination rule was amended to include the category of "family and relationship structures"; the UUA has yet to take specific follow-up action on this, however.

Many congregations are heavily involved in projects and efforts aimed at supporting environmental causes and sustainability. These are often termed "seventh principle" activities because of the seventh principle quoted above.

== Controversies ==
=== External ===
==== Lack of formal creed ====
In May 2004, Texas Comptroller Carole Keeton Strayhorn ended the tax-exempt status of the Red River Unitarian Universalist Church in Denison, Texas, because it was not a religious organization that has just one system of belief. The church's board president said he was shocked by the Comptroller's decision "because the Unitarian church in the United States has a very long history."

A 1997 ruling by the Texas Supreme Court stated that the Texas Comptroller cannot deny tax-exempt status to a religious group because it has multiple belief systems.

A week later, the Comptroller's general counsel informed the Red River Unitarian Universalist Church that he had reviewed their application for tax exemption and had determined that it "is an organization created for religious purposes" and would be granted the tax exemption.

==== Confusion with other groups ====
There are separate movements and organizations who hold to classical Unitarian or Christian universalist Christian theology and neither belong to the Unitarian Universalist Association nor consider themselves Unitarian Universalists. The American Unitarian Conference and the Christian Universalist Association are the two most significant organizations representing these theological beliefs today. Christians who hold these beliefs tend to consider themselves the true Unitarians or Universalists and heirs of the theological legacy of the original American Unitarian Association or Universalist Church of America, and they do not wish to be confused with Unitarian Universalists. The Unity Church is another denomination that is often confused with Unitarian Universalism.

==== Boy Scouts of America ====
In 1992, the UUA published statements opposing the BSA's policies of discriminating against homosexuals, atheists, and agnostics; and in 1993, the UUA updated the curriculum guidance of its "Religion in Life" emblems program for young people in scouting to include criticism of the BSA policies. On account of the published criticism, in 1998 the BSA withdrew its recognition of UUA's Religion in Life emblem program. Subsequently, the UUA removed the objectionable material from the program curriculum and the BSA renewed recognition of the Religion in Life program. Later, the UUA issued internal, supplemental material to emblems-program workbooks that included general statements critical of discrimination on bases of sexual orientation or personal religious viewpoint. When the BSA learned of those (internal) statements it again withdrew recognition of the UUA Religion in Life emblems program.

In 2004, the Unitarian Universalist Scouters Organization (UUSO), a group not affiliated with the UUA, established their "Living Your Religion" emblems program for UU-BSA scouts. Without the knowledge or approval of the UUA, the program was approved by the BSA Religious Relationships committee in 2005. Upon being notified of the UUSO program the UUA issued a statement (March 16, 2005) clarifying that UUSO was not an affiliate organization of the UUA and asserting that, contrary to reports otherwise, UU congregations were still awarding the UUA Religion in Life emblem to their youth members in BSA Scouts—whose emblems then were worn on the Scouts' uniforms without complaint from the BSA. Further, the statement made clear that the UUA still maintained its criticism of both the BSA's ongoing discrimination against gay Scouts and gay Scout leaders and the BSA requirement of a religious litmus test for membership.

Later events made these issues moot: In 2013, BSA opened its membership to gay youth, followed by opening membership to gay adults in 2015, which policy changes resolved the main UUA objection to supporting BSA. The UUSO dissolved in 2015 and by 2016, via a memorandum of understanding, the UUA religious emblems program was again formally recognized by BSA.

=== Internal ===
==== Language of reverence ====
During the presidency of William Sinkford, debate roiled the Unitarian Universalist (U.U.) movement over his call to return to, or to re-create, an authentic Unitarian Universalist "language of reverence." Sinkford suggested that as Unitarian Universalists abandoned traditional religious language they would relinquish, to others, religion's words of power. These other religionists would proceed to dictate their meanings of religious words and language, including scripture, in the public sphere. He advocated that Unitarian Universalists should regain their proper seat at the interfaith table by making this language their own. In response, others saw his idea as an effort to return Unitarian Universalist congregations to more orthodox Christian worship patterns. Indeed, some were concerned that it might be a call to oppose the growing influence among UUs of humanism and atheism, the adherents of which would be made unwelcome within the community. Sinkford denied such motives, citing the words of Unitarian Universalist humanists as examples of what he meant by "language of reverence".

The growth of humanism among Unitarian Universalists stemmed in part from the congregational commitment to reach a universal audience while educating U.U. folk in biblical literacy, many of whom were born into families that eschewed or minimized religious or moral catechisms. (In addition to humanists, these people comprehend atheists and theists, agnostics, skeptics and seekers, non-member affiliates, the religion-alienated and others among the larger UU congregation.) The debate saw the publication of a book by the UUA Beacon Press, written by former UUA President John Buehrens and titled Understanding the Bible: An Introduction for skeptics, seekers, and religious liberals. Meant to serve as a kind of handbook to be read alongside the Bible, it provides interpretative strategies from a liberal religious perspective for the reader to engage in conversation about the Bible—what it says and what it means today. Positive engagement is intended rather than to relinquish all public conversation to others over interpretation of the Bible. Another important work by Buehrens, with Forrest Church, is A Chosen Faith: An Introduction to Unitarian Universalism, in which the authors present the many sources of the Unitarian Universalist faith.

==== Borrowing from other religions ====
The "borrowing" of religious rituals from other faith traditions by Unitarian Universalists was discussed at the Unitarian Universalist General Assembly in 2001 during a seminar titled "Cultural Appropriation: Reckless Borrowing or Appropriate Cultural Sharing" by the Religious Education Dept, UUA. Of particular discussion was the borrowing of rituals and practices that are sacred to specific tribes or using spiritual practices without real context.

=== Racism ===
Internal controversy over the hiring of the UUA's Southern Region Lead (a white man from outside the region was hired rather than a Latina woman who resided within the region) led to resignations and apologies in 2017. UUA President Peter Morales, the denomination's first Latino president, resigned amid criticism of his failure to address the diversity controversies. The three co-presidents who took over commissioned a "racism audit" to address white supremacy within the denomination. In April 2018, The Washington Post reported that the UUA "in the past year has been asked to help resolve 15 congregational conflicts involving religious professionals of color".

== Organizations ==
=== Asia ===
- Philippines: Unitarian Universalist Church of the Philippines
- India: The Indian Council of Unitarian Churches, which includes the Khasi Unitarian Union
- Indonesia: Unitarian Christian Church of Indonesia (also known as Jemaat Allah Global Indonesia)

=== Africa ===
- South Africa: Unitarian Church of South Africa

=== Australia and New Zealand ===
- Australia and New Zealand Unitarian Universalist Association (ANZUUA) is a Unitarian Universalist organization which serves as the organizing body for Unitarian and Universalist congregations in Australia and New Zealand.

=== North America ===
- Canadian Unitarian Council (CUC) is the national body for Unitarian Universalist congregations in Canada. They were a member of the UUA up until July 2002.
  - Canadian Unitarians for Social Justice (CUSJ) is a Canadian Unitarian Universalist social justice organization that is an associate member of the CUC.
  - Canadian Unitarian Universalist Women's Association (CUUWA) is a Canadian Unitarian Universalist women's rights organization that is an associate member of the CUC.
- North American Unitarian Association (NAUA) is a North American group unaffiliated with the UUA.
- Unitarian Universalist Association (UUA) is the largest association of Unitarian, Universalist, and Unitarian Universalist congregations in the world, and the most well-known. It operates mainly within the United States including the territory of Puerto Rico. A few Unitarian and Unitarian Universalist congregations in other countries, such as San Miguel de Allende (Mexico), Auckland (New Zealand), and a few others are also members of the UUA. As of 2020, the UUA represents 1,078 member congregations that collectively include more than 152000 members.
  - Promise the Children is a 501(c)(3) nonprofit. Promise the Children's mission is to help Unitarian Universalists advocate for and with children and youth. Promise the Children is also an Independent Affiliate of the UUA
  - Young Religious Unitarian Universalists (YRUU) is a term used within the UUA and CUC. YRUU was an organization at the North American continental level primarily run by youth, ranging in age from 14 to 20, with mentoring adult partners. The North American continental organization of YRUU ended in 2008, but the term is still used by certain active youth groups and conferences at the congregational and regional/district levels. It was created in 1981 and 1982, at two conferences, Common Ground 1 and 2. Common Ground was called to form a UUA-controlled replacement for Liberal Religious Youth (LRY), the Unitarian Universalist youth organization that preceded YRUU. LRY was dissolved by the UUA, and its assets absorbed by it.
  - Unitarian Universalist Buddhist Fellowship (UUBF), is an association of Unitarian Universalists who define themselves as Buddhists. Formed in the early 1990s, UUBF exists to facilitate dialogue among UU Buddhists and other UUs interested in Buddhism and its practices. It is open to all Unitarian Universalists who are Buddhists of any tradition or who are interested in learning more about Buddhism. The UUBF publishes a newsletter, the UU Sangha, and posts back issues in an archive on its website. The website also has a list of UU Buddhist and meditation groups and contact information. Instructions for joining the UUBF Listserv are there also. Each year there is a UUBF booth in the exhibit hall at UUA General Assembly. Every other year, in odd years, the UUBF holds a Convocation.
  - Church of the Larger Fellowship (CLF) exists to serve Unitarian Universalists remote from any physical congregation, and is the largest congregation by membership in the UUA
  - Covenant of Unitarian Universalist Pagans (CUUPS) is an association of Unitarian Universalists who define themselves as Pagans or Neopagans.
  - Unitarian Universalist Christian Fellowship (UUCF) is an association of Unitarian Universalists who define themselves as Christians.
  - Unitarian Universalists for Polyamory Awareness is an association of Unitarian Universalists who support officially recognizing polyamory as a valid lifestyle.
  - Unitarian Universalist Service Committee is a nonsectarian organization devoted to promoting human rights and social justice worldwide.
- Unitarian Universalist Animal Ministry (UUAM) is a diverse group of Unitarian Universalists who aim to broaden the circle of compassion to animals.

=== Europe ===
- European Unitarian Universalists (EUU) is a network connecting Unitarian Universalists and English-speaking Unitarian Universalist fellowships in Europe.
- Czech Republic: Náboženská společnost českých unitářů (Religious Society of Czech Unitarians)
- Denmark: Unitarisk Kirkesamfund
- Finland: Unitarian Universalist Society of Finland
- Germany: Unitarier - Religionsgemeinschaft freien Glaubens
- Netherlands: Vrijzinnige Geloofsgemeenschap NPB
- Spain: Unitarian Universalist Society of Spain

=== Worldwide ===
- International Council of Unitarians and Universalists (ICUU) represented Unitarian, Universalist, and Unitarian Universalist churches worldwide. The UUA and CUC are both members of this organization.

== Number of members ==
=== United States ===
As of 2020, the UUA had 1,027 Unitarian Universalist member congregations in the United States and some congregations outside the US. In 2011, it had two congregations in the U.S. Virgin Islands, 19 in Canada, six in other countries, plus 28 multi-denominational member congregations: 17 in Massachusetts, four in Illinois, three in New Hampshire, two in Vermont, and one each in Maine and Washington, D.C. Seven of the ten U.S. states with the most congregations are also among the most populous states; the state with the most congregations and members is Massachusetts; Vermont is No. 1 relative to its total population. As of December 2023 there are 42 Unitarian Universalist congregations and emerging groups in Canada affiliated with the CUC.

In 1956, Sam Wells wrote, "Unitarians and Universalists are considering merger which would have total U.S. membership of 160000 (500000 in the world)". In 1965 Conkin wrote, "In 1961, at the time of the merger, membership [in the United States] was 104,821 in 651 congregations, and the joint membership soared to its historically highest level in the mid-1960s (an estimated 259000) before falling sharply back in the 1970s ...". According to the 2008 Yearbook of American & Canadian Churches, the Unitarian Universalist Association of Congregations claimed 214,738 members in 2002.

In the United States, the American Religious Identification Survey reported 629000 members describing themselves as Unitarian Universalist in 2001, an increase from 502000 reported in a similar survey in 1990. The highest concentrations are in New England and around Seattle, Washington.

The U.S. Religious Landscape Survey, conducted in 2007 by the Pew Forum on Religion and Public Life and featuring a sample size of over 35000, puts the proportion of American adults identifying as Unitarian Universalist at 0.3%.

=== Canada ===
The 2001 Canadian census done by Statistics Canada put Canadian Unitarians at 17,480, and the September 2007 membership statistics from the CUC show they had at that time 5,150 official members. In 2015, the CUC reported 3,804 members.

=== Australia and New Zealand ===
As of 2026, the Australian New Zealand Unitarian Universalist Association has 9 member congregations across Australia and New Zealand. In the 2021 Australian census, 830 Australians reported being affiliated with Unitarian Univeralism.

== See also ==
- List of Unitarian, Universalist, and Unitarian Universalist churches
- New religious movement – Religious community or spiritual group of modern origin
- Postchristianity – Loss of Christianity's cultural dominance
- United and uniting churches – Union of Protestant churches of different creeds
- United Church of Christ – Protestant Christian denomination
