= Bethine Clark Church =

American politician's wife

- Born: Jean Bethine Clark; February 19, 1923; Mackay, Idaho, U.S.
- Died: December 21, 2013 (aged 90); Boise, Idaho, U.S.
- Education: University of Michigan, B.A., 1945; Boise Junior College (1941–1942)
- Political party: Democratic
- Spouse: Frank Church (m. 1947; died 1984)
- Children: Frank Forrester Church IV (1948–2009); Chase Clark Church (b. 1957)
- Parent(s): Chase Clark (1883–1966); Jean Elizabeth Burnett Clark (1887–1984)

Jean Bethine Clark Church (February 19, 1923 – December 21, 2013), was the spouse of U.S. Senator Frank Church of Idaho. As politically active as her husband, she earned the nickname of "Idaho's third senator."

== Early life and education ==
Born in Mackay, Idaho, to Jean Elizabeth Burnett and Chase A. Clark, Bethine Clark's family was prominent in Idaho politics during the first half of the 20th century. Her grandfather Joseph was elected the first mayor of Idaho Falls in 1900.

Chase Clark and Bethine's uncle, Barzilla Clark, both served as mayor of Idaho Falls and were both elected Governor of Idaho for a two-year term, Chase Clark serving from 1941 to 1943. After losing his 1942 reelection bid, Chase Clark was appointed to the U.S. District Court for the District of Idaho by President Franklin D. Roosevelt. Bethine Clark's cousin D. Worth Clark represented Idaho in Washington as a member of the U.S. House and later the U.S. Senate.

While attending Idaho Falls High School, Clark participated in the debate club and student government. After her father was elected governor during her senior year, the family moved to Boise. While attending Boise High School, Bethine met junior Frank Church and they became close friends. After graduation in 1941, she attended Boise Junior College (now Boise State University) for a year, and was elected freshman class vice president. Frank Church graduated from Boise High in 1942 and enrolled at Stanford University in California; Clark transferred to the University of Michigan in Ann Arbor, her father's alma mater, and graduated in 1945 with a Bachelor of Arts degree in sociology.

== Bethine and Frank Church ==
While Clark was in Ann Arbor and after, she and Church stayed in touch by letters. After a year at Stanford, Church enlisted in the military in 1943, and served as a U.S. Army intelligence officer in China, Burma, and India during World War II." After returning from military service, he returned to Stanford and proposed marriage to Clark; the couple announced their engagement in December 1946. On June 21, 1947, they were married at the Clark family ranch, Robinson Bar Ranch (44.247°N 114.678°W), located east of Stanley. (The ranch was later owned by singer Carole King.)

Frank completed his bachelor's degree in political science at Stanford in 1947 and enrolled at Harvard Law School that September, but was forced to withdraw and transfer to Stanford after being diagnosed with cancer. While he was undergoing cancer treatments, the couple welcomed their first child Frank Forrester IV in 1948 on September 23. At age 32 in 1956, Frank ran for the U.S. Senate and beat first-term incumbent Herman Welker of Payette. The following year the family moved to Washington, D.C. and adopted a son and named him Chase Clark Church. Frank Church served four terms in the Senate but was defeated for reelection in 1980 by Steve Symms. Early in 1984, Church was diagnosed with terminal pancreatic cancer and he died on April 7 at age 59.

In many ways Bethine Clark was as politically active as her husband, actively participating in his campaigns for the Senate and his 1976 presidential campaign. Throughout his time as senator, Bethine's involvement in her husband's campaigns and active participation in public life earned her the informal title as "Idaho's third senator." Coming from a very politically involved and powerful family, Bethine Church was a natural for a career in public service. She chaired or served as a trustee to many committees and organizations over the years. After Frank's death, Bethine continued her work in politics, on the national level as well as the state level. In later life she was known as the "matriarch of the Idaho Democratic Party."

== Political life ==
Bethine Church was urged to run for the Senate in 1986. If she had decided to run, she would have been fighting for the same seat which her husband had previously held for 24 years. Church knew she didn't fit into the classic mold for a politician's wife: "I have often described my life in Washington as like Cinderella's—I was either cleaning the fireplace or going to the ball." Until her death Bethine Church was still involved with many organizations, including:

- Chairperson of The Frank Church Institute, Boise State University
- President and Founder of The Sawtooth Society
- Governing Council member of The Wilderness Society
- Honorary Board Member of the Terry Reilly Health Services
- Sustaining Member of the Boise Junior League
- Member of the Idaho Conservation League

Church held many other prestigious titles over her career, including:

- Past Honorary Co-chair, Idaho Anne Frank Human Rights Memorial, Boise
- Past Advisory Board Member, Basque Museum & Cultural Center, Boise
- Martin Institute for Peace Studies Advisory Board, Moscow, Idaho
- Trustee, Boise State University Foundation
- President's Advisory Committee, John F. Kennedy Center for the Performing Arts, Washington, D.C.
- Better Business Bureau "Integrity Counts" Contest – Chair of Judges
- Finance Committee, Idaho State Democratic Party
- BSU Radio Network Community Advisory Board
- Emeritus Member, Board of Directors, U.S. Capitol Historical Society, Washington D.C.
- Trustee, Meridian House in Washington, D.C.
- Member, Past President, OpenSecrets, Washington, D.C.
- Trustee, Future Homemakers of America Foundation, Reston, Virginia
- Advisory Board, A Television History of Idaho, IP-TV, Boise, Idaho
- Member, Governor's Task Force on Home Care, 1991–92, Idaho

== Death ==
Church died at age 90 in Boise on December 21, 2013. Her son Chase announced her death on Facebook.
