= Australia and New Zealand Unitarian Universalist Association =

Unitarian Universalist organisation

- The official logo of the ANZUUA, based upon the flaming chalice motif
- Abbreviation: ANZUUA
- Classification: Unitarian Universalism
- Associations: International Council of Unitarians and Universalists
- Region: Australia and New Zealand
- Origin: 1974
- Other name(s): Australia and New Zealand Unitarian Association
- Publications: Quest
- Official website: www.anzuua.org

The Australia and New Zealand Unitarian Universalist Association or ANZUUA is a Unitarian Universalist organisation which serves as the organising body for Unitarian and Universalist congregations in Australia and New Zealand. ANZUUA was established in 1974 as the Australia and New Zealand Unitarian Association.

ANZUUA is also a member of the International Council of Unitarians and Universalists.

== Congregations ==
ANZUA has member congregations in:

- Adelaide
- Auckland
- Blenheim
- Brisbane
- Canberra
- Christchurch
- Melbourne
- Nelson
- Perth
- Sydney
- Wellington
