= International Council of Unitarians and Universalists =

Unitarian and Universalist umbrella organization

- The official logo of the ICUU, containing both an image of the Earth and a flaming chalice.
- Abbreviation: ICUU
- Classification: Unitarianism, Christian Universalism, Unitarian Universalism
- Executive Director: Rev. Steve Dick
- Region: International
- Origin: March 4, 1995
- Defunct: 2021
- Members: 17 (organizations)
- Publications: Global Chalice
- Official website: internationalcounciluu.org

The International Council of Unitarians and Universalists (ICUU) was an umbrella organization founded in 1995 comprising many Unitarian, Universalist, and Unitarian Universalist organizations. It was dissolved in 2021 along with the Unitarian Universalist Partner Church Council to make way for a new merged entity, the U/U Global Network, founded in 2024. Some groups represented only a few hundred people; while the largest, the Unitarian Universalist Association, had more than 160,000 members as of May 2011—including over 150,000 in the United States.

== History ==
The original initiative for its establishment was contained in a resolution of the General Assembly of Unitarian and Free Christian Churches (British Unitarians) in 1987. This led to the establishment of the Advocates for the Establishment of an International Organization of Unitarians (AEIOU), which worked towards creating the council. However, the General Assembly resolution provided no funding.

The Unitarian Universalist Association (UUA) became particularly interested in the establishment of a council when it had to deal with an increasing number of applications for membership from congregations outside North America. It had already granted membership to congregations in Adelaide, Auckland, the Philippines and Pakistan, and congregations in Sydney, Russia and Spain had applied for membership. Rather than admit congregations from all over the world, the UUA hoped that they would join a world council instead. The UUA thus became willing to provide funding for the council's establishment.

As a result, the council was finally established at a meeting in Essex, Massachusetts, United States on 23–26 March 1995.

== Principles and purposes ==
The Preamble to the Constitution of the International Council of Unitarians and Universalists reads:

We, the member groups of the International Council of Unitarians and Universalists, affirming our belief in religious community based on:

- liberty of conscience and individual thought in matters of faith,
- the inherent worth and dignity of every person.
- justice and compassion in human relations,
- responsible stewardship in human relations,
- and our commitment to democratic principles,

declare our purposes to be:

- to serve the Infinite Spirit of Life and the human community by strengthening the worldwide Unitarian and Universalist faith,
- to affirm the variety and richness of our living traditions,
- to facilitate mutual support among member organizations,
- to promote our ideals and principles around the world,
- to provide models of liberal religious response to the human condition which upholds our common values.

== Members ==
=== Full members ===
- Australian and New Zealand Unitarian Universalist Association (ANZUUA), 500 members
- Brazilian Unitarian Association
- Burundi Unitarian Church
- Canadian Unitarian Council, 5,150
- Czech Republic: Náboženská společnost českých unitářů (Religious Society of Czech Unitarians)
- Denmark: Unitarisk Kirkesamfund, 55 families
- European Unitarian Universalists, 120 members across Europe
- Finland: Unitarian Universalist Society of Finland, 22 members
- Germany: Unitarier - Religionsgemeinschaft freien Glaubens
- Hungary: Unitarian Church of Hungary, 25,000 members
- India: The Indian Council of Unitarian Churches, which includes the Khasi Unitarian Union, 9,000 members, and the Unitarian Christian Church of Madras, 225 members
- Indonesia Global Church of God, around 200 members
- Netherlands: Vrijzinnige Geloofsgemeenschap NPB, 4,385 members (2011), 60 congregations
- Nigeria: First Unitarian Church of Nigeria and Ijo Isokan Gbogbo Eda (Unitarian Brotherhood Church) Defunct
- Norwegian Unitarian Church
- Philippines: Unitarian Universalist Church of the Philippines founded 1954, 2000 members
- Romania: Unitarian Church of Transylvania, 80,000 members
- South Africa: Unitarian Church of South Africa, 110 members
- Spain: Unitarian Universalist Society of Spain, 55 members
- UK: General Assembly of Unitarian and Free Christian Churches, 6,000 members
- USA: Unitarian Universalist Association (UUA), 162,796 (adult members)

=== Reorganizing ===
- Kosciol Unitarianski (Unitarian Church in Poland), 80 attendees and friends.

Polish Unitarians have reported a need for a period of reorganization, and that at this time they are unable to maintain the level of activity needed to be full Council members, be it moved that membership of these groups be suspended. This action is taken with regret and the ICUU looks forward to welcoming Poland back into membership at the earliest possible date.

=== Provisional members ===
Churches and religious associations which have expressed their will to become members of the Council may be admitted as "Provisional Members" for a period of time (generally two or four years), until the Council decides that they have shown their organizational stability, affinity with the ICUU principles and commitment to deserve becoming Full Members of the Council. Provisional Members are invited to Council meetings through a delegate but cannot vote.

- Kenyan Unitarians

=== Emerging groups ===
According to the Bylaws of the ICUU, Emerging Groups are "applicants that are deemed to be reasonable prospects for membership, but do not fulfil the conditions of either Provisional membership or Full Membership". These groups may be designated as Emerging Groups by the Executive Committee upon its sole discretion. Emerging Groups may be invited as observers to General Meetings.

The current list of Emerging Groups after the last meeting of the Executive Committee (London, 22–25 November 2008) is as follows:

- Congo Unitarians
- French Unitarians (Assemblée Fraternelle des Chrétiens Unitariens)
- Unitarian Universalists Hong Kong—Hong Kong (China)
- Italian Unitarians
- Mexico (two groups: the Free Unitarian Congregation of Mexico, (LCUM) and the Unitarian Universalists of Mexico AC)

=== Associates ===
Organizations with beliefs and purposes closely akin to those of ICUU but which by nature of their constitution are not eligible for full membership or which do not wish to become full members now or in the foreseeable future, may become Associates of the ICUU. The application must be approved by the ICUU Council Meeting.

=== Unitarian or Universalist groups which are in contact but with no formal link to the ICUU ===
- Peace and Harmony Center—Ushuaia, Argentina
- Christian Unitarian Church of Argentina—Buenos Aires, Argentina
- Bolivian Unitarians
- Costa Rican Unitarians (apparently inactive)
- Croatian Unitarian Universalists (UU Section of the Humanitas association)
- Eglise Unitarienne de France
- Berlin Unitarian Church (Germany)
- Free Unitarian Fellowship, Frankfurt-am-Main (Germany)
- Icelandic Unitarians within the National Church of Iceland
- Doojin Christian Church (Japan)
- Ruai/Tasia Unitarian Universalist Church in Kenya
- UU Fellowship of Puerto Rico
- Togo Unitarians

== See also ==
- United and uniting churches
