= Fulgence Ndagijimana =

Rev. Fulgence Ndagijimana is the founder of the Burundian Unitarian Universalist Church and Vice President of the International Council of Unitarians and Universalists.

Rev. Ndagijimana founded the first Unitarian Church in Burundi in 2002. The Unitarian Church in Burundi (Assemblée des chrétiens unitariens du Burundi) sits in Musaga, a neighborhood of the capital, that has been at the center of the violence and protests. Ndagijimana established the church as an alternative to the country's dominant Roman Catholicism. The congregation dedicated its church building in 2011 and established connections with churches around the world shortly thereafter.

In November 2015, during the 2015 Burundi unrest, Ndagjimana was imprisoned for suspected support of opposition parties. Unitarianism is a small, distrusted minority religion in Burundi and therefore members of the church were targets for government-supporting forces. Ndagjimana stated that he was taken from his church office and detained for nine days, accused of funding criminals and money laundering.

After an International campaign of letter-writing and petitions, Ndagjimana was freed and fled the country. He now lives and preaches in Canada. He continues to support Burundian Unitarians in Burundi and in various refugee camps through international fundraising.
