= Susan Loy =

American artist

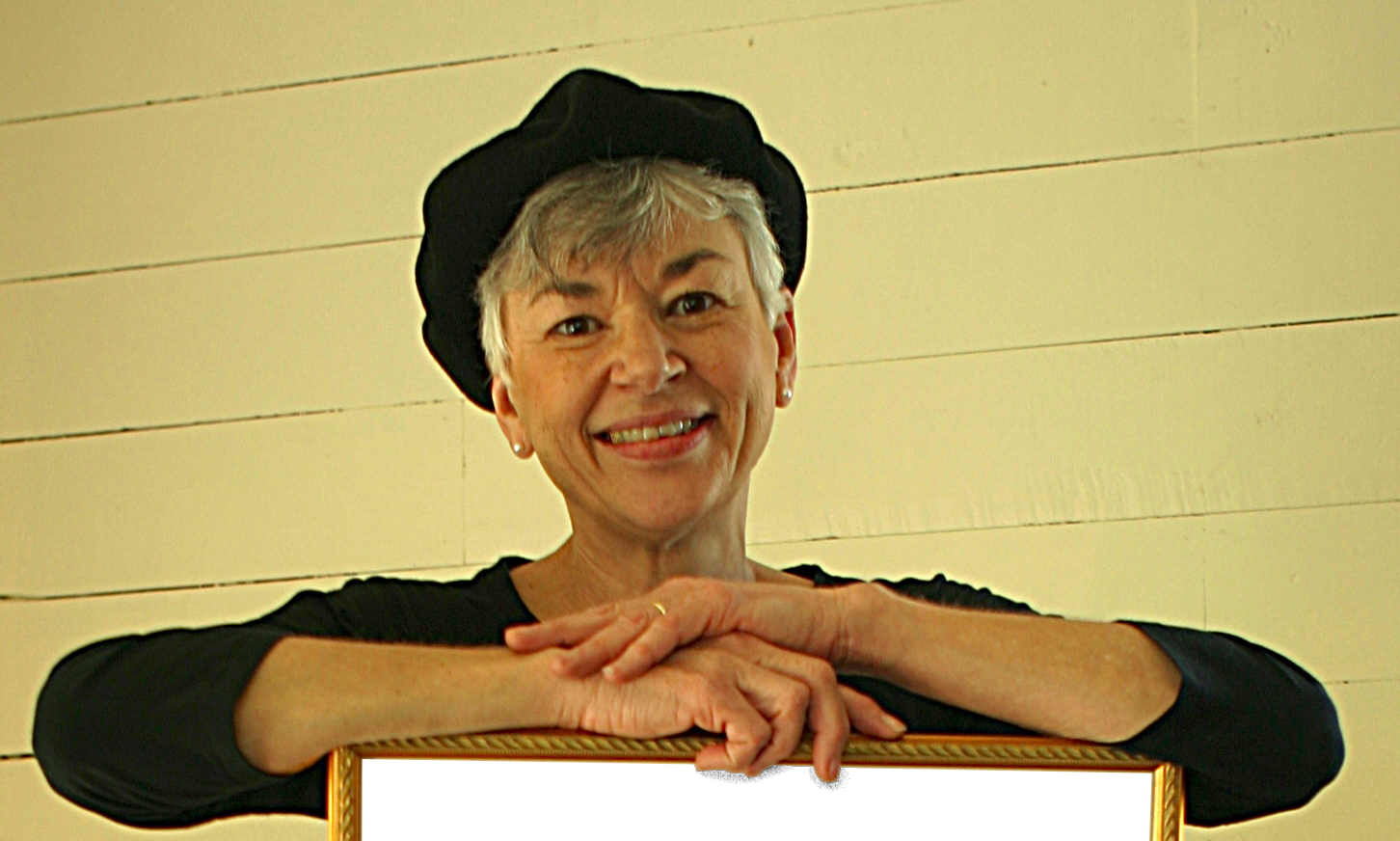
- Artist, calligrapher and author Susan Loy pictured, 2009
- Born: February 26, 1951 (age 75)
- Education: Art history and literature
- Known for: Watercolor painting and calligraphy using steel pens and brushes
- Website: literarycalligraphy.com

Susan Loy (born February 26, 1951) is a North American artist, calligrapher, and author best known for her "Literary Calligraphy" watercolor paintings of the Language of Flowers and the White House Easter Egg Roll. These paintings combine hand-lettered classic quotations from William Shakespeare, Emily Dickinson, Biblical sources, etc. with finely-rendered illustration done with steel pens and brushes.

== Education ==
Loy was a 1969 graduate of Midpark High School in Middleburg Heights, Ohio. She graduated in American Studies from Miami University in Oxford, Ohio, in 1973. Her art was included in an exhibit at the Miami University Dolibois European Center in 2018. Loy's graduate studies included art history, literature, and geography at Ohio State University.

She worked as a research associate at the Columbus (Ohio) Museum of Fine Art and as a geographer at Battelle Memorial Institute, also in Columbus, Ohio.

Loy took a calligraphy course in Columbus in 1978 and was captivated; she later explained that the pen was like a magic wand when she picked it up. She felt that her research background in cognitive geography, art history, and literature brought her into the art world “through the back door,” rather than gaining entrance through studio classes as is typical for many artists.

== Style ==
During the 1980s, Loy developed her style of combining hand-lettered texts in the form of a mandala, a Sanskrit word that means circle. The art columnist for The Roanoke Times dubbed Loy's works a mix of “magic circles, calligraphy, and philosophical texts.” Loy told a reporter that she had adopted a “commercially refined style for the calligraphy.”

In 2000, the coordinator of the Yankee Peddler Foundation in Medina, Ohio stated that, "Ms. Loy’s Literary Calligraphy demonstrates how type blossoms into art in a calligrapher’s hand.” Her style has also been described as, "poetry meets flowers, meets artistic script."

In 2008, Loy estimated that she had completed 150 modern mandalas.

== Language of Flowers ==
Loy has completed numerous paintings and authored a book on the Language of Flowers. The March, 1994 edition of Victorian Sampler magazine featured Susan in an article entitled “The Language of Flowers.” Loy wrote an article for the Emily Dickinson International Society describing her artistic process for painting a suite of Dickinson poems. In 2001 Susan Loy's book on the Language of Flowers, Flowers the Angel’s Alphabet, was published. It won the 2002 Benjamin Franklin Award for the Gardening and Reference categories and was named Outstanding Book of the Year by the Independent Book Publishers Association. In 2018, Susan wrote a book chapter connecting the Victorian flower language to modern flower emojis.

== White House Easter Egg Roll ==
A highlight of Loy's career was her three-year relationship with the White House Easter Egg Roll. In 1997, Loy was chosen as the Easter egg artist for the state of Virginia and her painted egg was displayed at the White House. Loy was chosen to serve as 1998 Artist-on-the-Lawn and to create the program cover for the 1998 White House Easter Egg Roll and to capture impressions of that event. As Artist on the Lawn, Loy painted “The White House Easter Egg Roll, 1878-1998” as the official poster for the 1999 event, and presented it to the President Bill Clinton and First Lady Hillary Clinton.

== Constitution Project ==
Loy's hand-lettering of the U.S. Constitution project began after the September 11 attacks in 2001 when she was stopped by the police on three separate occasions beginning in May 2002. She began her Constitution paintings with the Preamble. Susan spoke to several school classes on Constitution Day, September 17, 2007. According to her website, "THE CONSTITUTION PROJECT – Constitution prints by artist Susan Loy". it took Loy more than 2500 hours to complete the seven paintings that comprise her hand-lettered and illustrated U.S. Constitution. She also completed paintings of the Declaration of Independence and The Gettysburg Address to complement the Constitution Project.

== American Arts and Crafts Festival Artist ==
Susan Loy began exhibiting her art at outdoor art festivals in the early 1980s at her local “Art in the Alley” in Bedford, Virginia. She founded Literary Calligraphy in 1983, and was joined by her husband in 1990. Together, they increased their number of shows and festivals, expanded the company and built a shop to accommodate cutting custom mats, picture framing, and selling reproductions and stationery. In 2003, Literary Calligraphy estimated that it sold 3,000 reproductions per year, had a mailing list of 35,000 and employed up to eight full- and part-time persons. According to their website, Loy and her company traveled widely to art festivals in the eastern United States, for example, the Ann Arbor Art Fairs (Ann Arbor, Michigan), St. James Court Art Show (Louisville, Kentucky) and Three Rivers Art Festival (Pittsburgh, Pennsylvania). In addition, they sold at crafts shows, flower shows including the Philadelphia Flower Show (Philadelphia, Pennsylvania) and the Northwest Flower and Garden Show (Seattle, Washington), as well as at selected conventions, including the American Library Association and the National Council of Teachers of English. They continue to sell reproductions and stationery in the United States at amazon.com

== Moving to the Czech Republic ==
In the autumn of 2017, Susan and her husband announced that they were leaving the American arts and craft show circuit, closing their custom framing operations, and moving to Prague in the Czech Republic. She admitted that it was a bit of a shock. Loy explained that, “I had a junior year abroad in Luxembourg and always wanted to return and live in Europe, but the lifestyle and rewards of a touring artist kept me in Virginia.” She chose Prague because it is a “world-class city and affordable.”

Loy and her husband received their first long-stay visa in April 2018. The Czech Unitarian Church sponsored their visa. Her artwork was described and pictured in the 2019 publication Tvůrčí život. Loy made two presentations on Transcendentalism and nature at conferences in Prague in 2019 and 2022.

== The Czech Flower Alphabet ==
Loy's major project for the Czech Unitarian Church was commemorating the Flower Communion introduced by Norbert Čapek in 1923. She decided to create a painting incorporating a flower for every letter of the Czech alphabet and a quotation from Čapek.

As a non-Czech speaker, her first challenge was determining how many letters are in the Czech alphabet? When Loy posed this question to Czechs, “…they would pause and look at me with a curious expression, and then they would begin counting on their hands, or they would discuss it.” Eventually, Loy learned that the answer is “...anywhere between 28 and 42 letters, depending on how you count the diacritical marks.

On June 14, 2020, Loy unveiled a watercolor painting, titled Czech Flower Alphabet, so detailed that it took her two years to complete. Loy presented the painting at the annual Flower Communion in Čapek Hall in the Unitaria on Anenská in Prague 1. A video recorded an interview of Susan Loy in her Prague studio, conducted by art historian, Jana Ticha. The interview covers Loy's connection to Čapek's Flower Celebration, the research that she conducted in order to plan the watercolor painting, and the technique she used to create the painting. "Flower Connections: An Interview with Calligrapher Susan Loy" on YouTube

== Prague International Art Exhibition ==
In 2021 Loy began discussions with her Czech Unitarian sponsor on a new project, an art exhibition. COVID-19 delayed the exhibition. Loy and her husband started the project in 2022 with an English and Czech website to promote the exhibition to artists. Loy was the director of the event but did not participate as an artist. The 2023 Prague International Art Exhibition was open from May 18 – June 1, 2023, with 54 artists from 33 countries. [34]
