= Water Communion =

Ritual service common in Unitarian Universalism

The Water Communion (Water Ritual) is a ritual service common in Unitarian Universalist congregations. It is usually held in the fall, during September, as it is the beginning of the Liturgical year.

Some congregations of other religions have also adopted the ritual. For example, a United Methodist service on Earth Day 2013 in Austin, Texas, includes a water communion.

== History ==
The first Water Ritual was held at the November 1980 Women and Religion Continental Convocation of Unitarian Universalists in East Lansing, Michigan. It was created by activist Carolyn McDade and UU leader Lucile Schuck Longview "as a way for women who lived far apart to connect the work each was doing locally to the whole". Eight women were asked to bring water from different sources, including rainwater, the Assiniboine River, the Atlantic ocean, the Rio Grande, and the Pacific Ocean.

It has come to be used as an ingathering/homecoming ritual for UU congregations.

== Ritual ==
Due to the nature of Unitarian Universalism, traditions vary from one congregation to another; however, most Water Communions follow the same basic framework.

Throughout the year, members of the congregation collect small amounts of water that have meaning for them, either from a special location (e.g., the family home, an ocean or river, memento of a trip) or a special occasion (first rain after a dry spell). At the service, the samples of water are placed in a single bowl so they can merge.

Oftentimes, some of the water is saved, sterilized, and then used for ceremonial purposes at other times of the year. The rest is returned to the world.

== Symbolism ==
The symbolism, like that of the comparable Flower Communion, can be interpreted in various ways. The classic life-related symbolism of water is apparent. The rejoining of many waters can also symbolize the rejoining of the congregation after summer travels.

McDade and Longview chose this way to honor the "journeys" of women, and to represent the way women both contribute to and draw from each other's strength, working both individually and together, to bring change.
