= Unitarian Church of All Souls =

Church in Manhattan, New York

Coordinates: 40.7755°N 73.9584°W

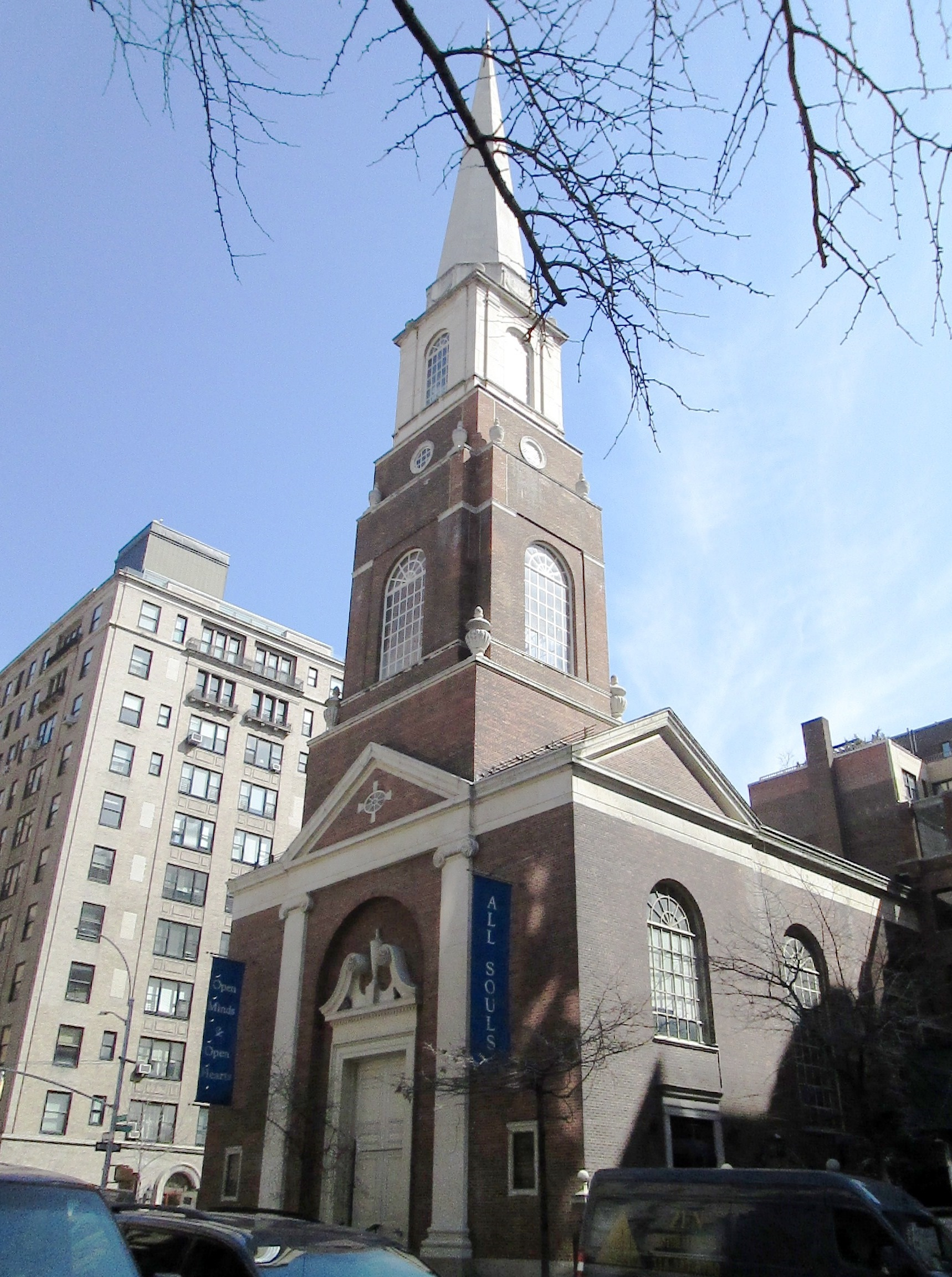
- (2016)

Religion
- Affiliation: Unitarian Universalist Association
- Year consecrated: 1819

Location
- Location: Upper East Side, New York, NY, USA
- Interactive map of Unitarian Church of All Souls

Specifications
- Direction of façade: west
- Materials: Brick, wood, stone

The Unitarian Church of All Souls at 1157 Lexington Avenue at East 80th Street on the Upper East Side of Manhattan, New York City was built in 1932 and was designed by Hobart Upjohn – Richard Upjohn's grandson – in the Neo-colonial style with a Regency-influenced brick base. It is the congregation's fourth sanctuary. The congregation, dating back to 1819, was the first Unitarian Universalist congregation in the city. It has provided a pulpit for some of the movement's leading theologians and has also recorded many eminent persons in its membership.

== History ==
All Souls was the first Unitarian congregation to be organized in New York and originated in 1819 when Lucy Channing Russell invited forty friends and neighbors into her Lower Manhattan home to listen to an address by her brother, William Ellery Channing, the minister of the Federal Street Church in Boston. Channing was making a stop in New York while traveling to Baltimore to preach the famous sermon in which he would articulate the distinctive tenets of Unitarian Christianity, the most salient of which were the rejection of the Trinity in favor of absolute monotheism, and the imperative to interpret the Christian Bible through reason. In New York, the enthusiasm aroused by Channing culminated in the formation of the First Congregational Church (Unitarian), which proceeded to erect its first building in 1820–21, on Chambers Street between Church Street and Chapel Street, before it had even found a minister. The task of recruitment was difficult since few ministers could be persuaded to venture away from the stability of the Unitarian heartland in New England and risk their careers in new congregations beyond. Finally, on December 18, 1821, William Ware was installed as the first minister.

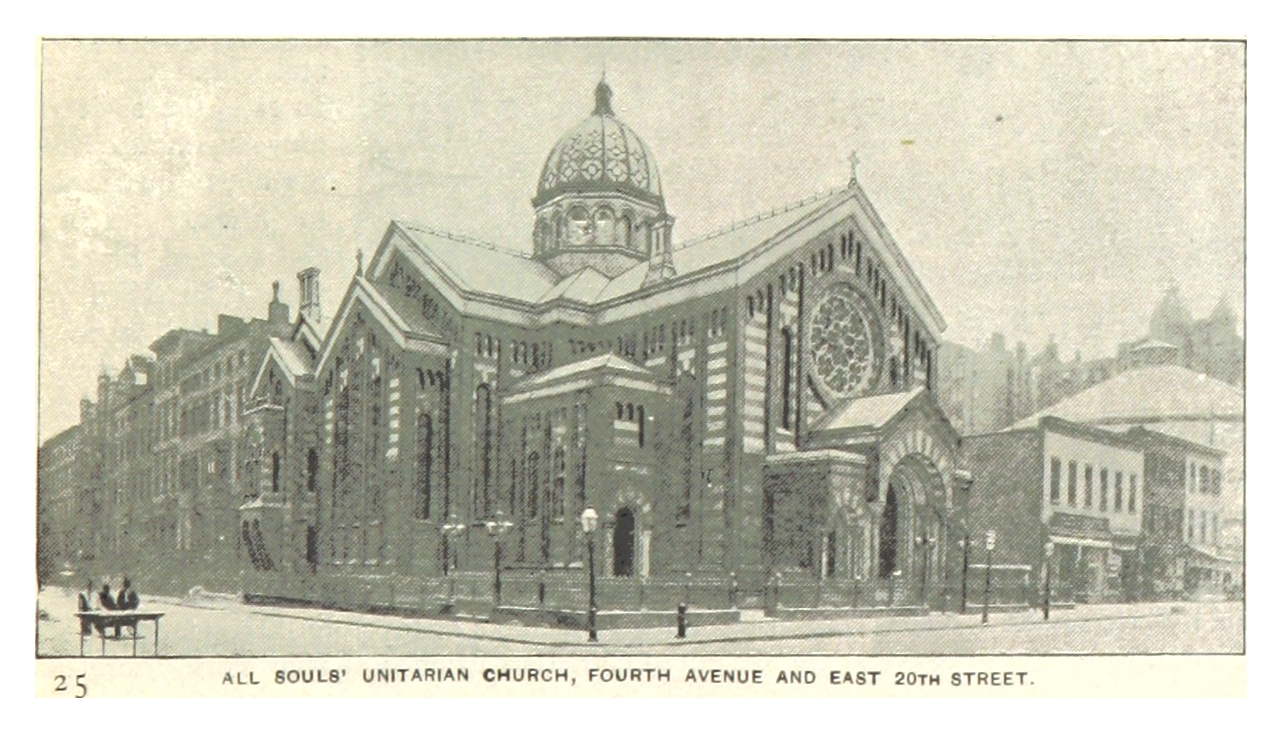
391 4th Ave, "Holy Zebra"

In 1845, the congregation moved to a new building at 548 Broadway, renaming itself the Church of the Divine Unity the following year. In 1855, the present name, All Souls, was taken by an American church for the first time when the congregation dedicated its third building, at 249 Fourth Avenue (now Park Avenue South) and 20th Street. The new church was designed by Jacob Wrey Mould and featured bands of red and white bricks and Caen stone, which led to the colloquial names of "The Holy Zebra" and "The Beefsteak Church."

In partnership with minister Henry Whitney Bellows, who served for over four decades from 1839 to 1882, All Souls grew to include some of the leading social reformers and cultural figures of the city, such as Peter Cooper, Herman Melville, and others. One noted member was the novelist Catharine Sedgwick, who remarked upon the diverse backgrounds of the people who were attracted to the freedom of ethical inquiry that All Souls offered: "strangers from inland and outland, English radicals and daughters of Erin, Germans and Hollanders, philosophic gentiles and unbelieving Jews . . . In this, our ass'n, there is at least one of every sort." In evolving from its roots in Unitarian Christianity, All Souls embraced an enlarging religious pluralism that continues to this day.

All Souls relocated to its current building on the Upper East Side at 1157 Lexington Avenue at 80th Street in 1932, designed by Richard Upjohn's grandson, Hobart Upjohn, in the Colonial Revival style with a Regency-influenced base. Forrest Church, the prolific author and theologian, then served as senior minister for almost thirty years until the beginning of 2007, when, due to terminal cancer, he was succeeded by Galen Guengerich and assumed the less strenuous duties of minister of public theology. Church's charismatic style has been credited with the revitalization of the congregation.

== Notable members ==
- George Fisher Baker, financier, philanthropist
- William Cullen Bryant, poet, journalist
- Peter Cooper industrialist, philanthropist (founder of Cooper Union)
- Nathaniel Currier, lithographer, co-founder of Currier and Ives
- Louis R. Dressler, organist at Unitarian Church of All Souls from 1905 to 1921
- Dorman Bridgman Eaton, lawyer, civil service reformer
- Caroline Kirkland, writer
- Will C. Macfarlane, organist at Unitarian Church of All Souls from 1888-1900.
- Herman Melville, writer
- Laura Pedersen, author, journalist, playwright, humorist
- Louisa Lee Schuyler, Sanitary Commission organizer, founder of America's first nursing school at Bellevue Hospital
- Catharine Sedgwick, writer
- Samuel Prowse Warren; organist at Unitarian Church of All Souls from 1865 to 1868

== See also ==
- Transcendentalism
