= House of Unitarians, Copenhagen =

Chapel in Copenhagen, Denmark

Coordinates: 55.6955°N 12.5816°E

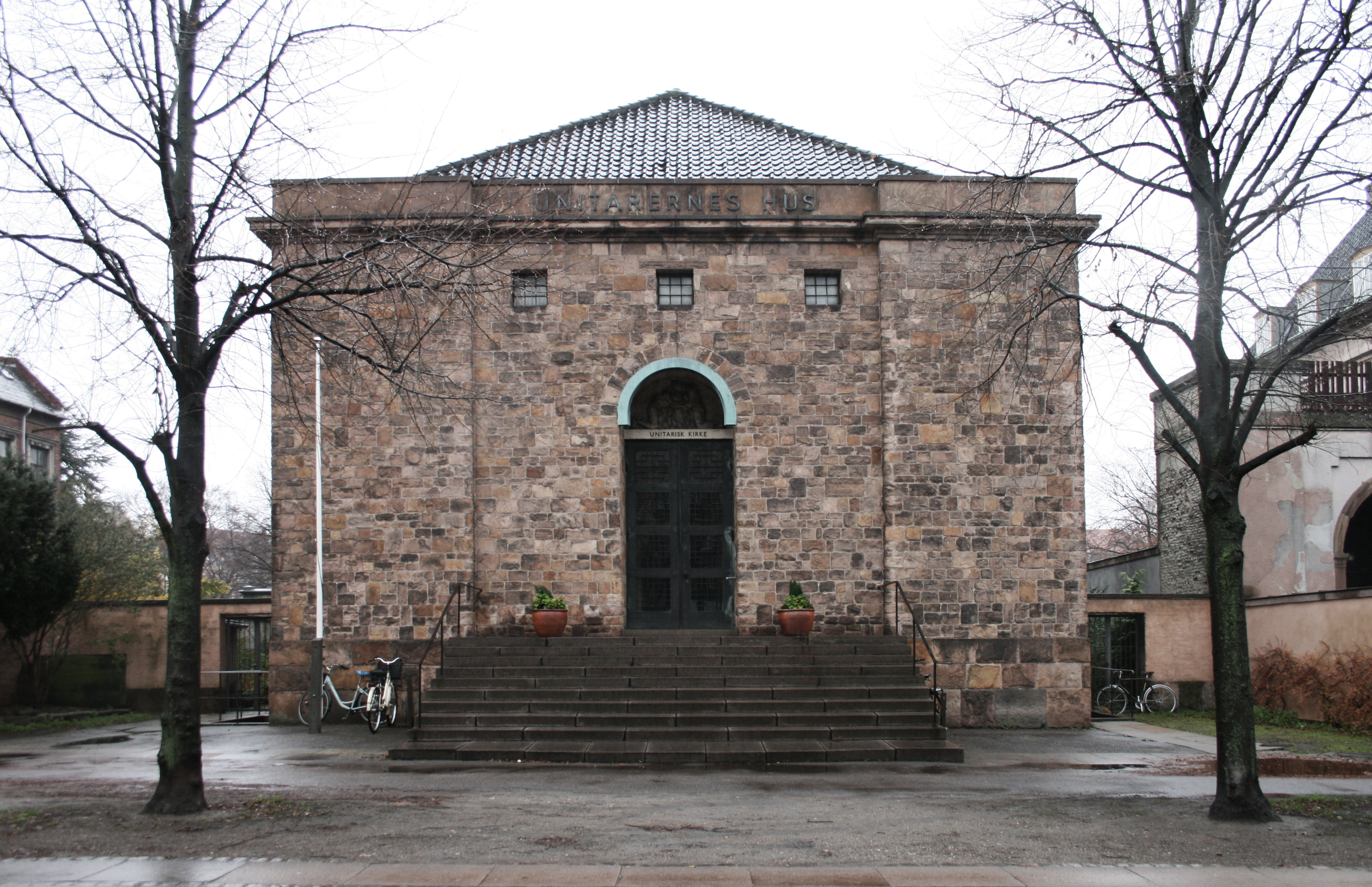
Unitarian Chapel, Copenhagen

"Unitarernes Hus" (English: House of Unitarians) in Copenhagen, Denmark, is the chapel of the Danish Unitarian Church Society. It was designed by Carl Brummer and opened in 1927 on Østerbrogade (now Dag Hammerskjolds Allé). The Society asked Brummer to design a building which reflected the Unitarian ideals of tolerance towards other religions. He sought to achieve this by creating a building which combined elements from different monotheistic religions, such as Christianity (the original basilica shape), Jewish synagoges (two balconies) and Greek Orthodox temples (the Greek fret). Behind the pulpit is a large fresco painted by Professor Oscar Mathiesen depicting the Biblical scene of "The Parable of the Good Samaritan".
