= John A. Buehrens =

Unitarian Universalist minister

The Reverend John A. Buehrens
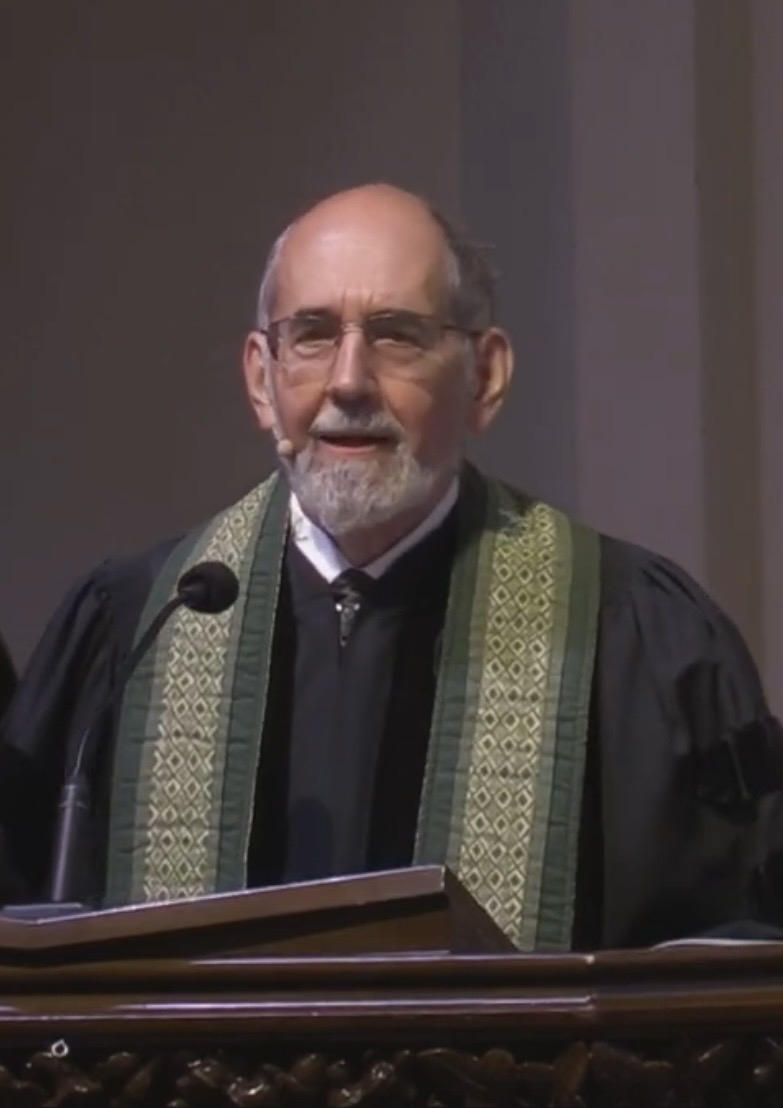

6th President of the Unitarian Universalist Association
- In office 1993–2001
- Preceded by: Rev. William Schulz
- Succeeded by: Rev. William G. Sinkford

Personal details
- Born: June 21, 1947 (age 78) Peekskill, New York, U.S.
- Spouse: Gwen Buehrens (m. 1972)
- Occupation: Unitarian Universalist minister, theologian, writer

Religious life
- Religion: Unitarian Universalism
- Denomination: Unitarian Universalist Association
- Profession: Minister

John A. Buehrens (born 1947) is an American Unitarian Universalist religious leader, minister, and author.

== Biography ==
Buehrens was ordained in 1973 and served his first congregation in Knoxville, Tennessee. He then became Senior Minister of First Unitarian Church of Dallas in 1981 and following that, Associate Minister of the Unitarian Church of All Souls in New York City. He was then elected to become the sixth president of the Unitarian Universalist Association; he served from 1993 to 2001 and resided in the Boston area. Following that, from 2002 to 2012, Buehrens served as minister of First Parish in Needham, Massachusetts. He served as Interim Minister at the Unitarian Universalist Church of the Monterey Peninsula in Carmel, California. He served as Developmental Senior Minister of the First Unitarian Universalist Society of San Francisco and retired in June 2017.

== Bibliography ==
Buehrens's published writings include the following:

- The Uses of Memory (Voices of liberal religion), Rising Press, 1992
- A Chosen Faith: An Introduction to Unitarian Universalism, with Forrest Church, Beacon Press, 1998 (revised), ISBN 0-8070-1616-0 (hardcover), ISBN 0-8070-1617-9 (paperback)
- The Unitarian Universalist Pocket Guide, 3e, (editor), Skinner House Books, 1999, ISBN 1-55896-388-X
- Understanding the Bible: An Introduction for Skeptics, Seekers, and Religious Liberals, Beacon Press, 2003, ISBN 0-8070-1052-9 (hardcover), ISBN 0-8070-1053-7 (paperback)
- A House for Hope: The Promise of Progressive Religion for the Twenty-first Century, with Rebecca Parker, Beacon Press, 2010, ISBN 978-0807077382 (hardcover), ISBN 978-0807001509 (paperback)
- Universalists and Unitarians in America : a people's history, Skinner House, 2011, ISBN 978-1-55896-612-3
- Conflagration: How the Transcendentalists Sparked the American Struggle for Racial, Gender, and Social Justice, Beacon Press 2020, ISBN 9780807024041
- A Religious Center with a Civic Circumference: Unitarians in San Francisco Since 1850, First Unitarian Universalist Society of San Francisco, 2023, ISBN 979-8985275704
