= Norwegian Unitarian Church =

Denomination of the Unitarian Chrisitanity in Norway

Unitarforbundet Bét Dávid (Unitarian Union Beth David, The Norwegian Unitarian Church) (the Hebrew בֵּית דָּוִד house of David) is the denomination of Unitarian Christianity in Norway.

The Unitarian Church continues the Christian tradition, which today exists in the Hungarian and Transylvanian Unitarian Church. It shares this common background with the first Unitarian Church in Norway created by Kristofer Janson in 1895, but also places emphasis on practicing a common Jewish heritage, differentiating it from other denominations. The Norwegian Unitarian Church is located close to the Jewish-Unitarian Szekler-sabbatarianism and probably represents today one of the closest to the religious context called Judeo-Christianity. Proximity to Judaism is due to a belief that Christianity must be understood through a Jewish perspective. This is justified historically from the fact that Christianity was regarded as a part of Judaism prior to the destruction of Jerusalem by the Romans in the year 70 AD. However, the Unitarian Church faith community is established in a clear liberal Christian historical tradition.

== History ==
In 1894, Hans Tambs Lyche (1859–1898) established Norway's first Unitarian periodical, Free Word. The previous year, he had made an unsuccessful attempt to establish the country's first Unitarian church. Based on the preliminary work that Tambs Lyche did, Kristofer Janson founded the first Unitarian church in Norway in 1895. Until 1900 this church was called Broderskabets Church (Church of the Brotherhood), but was later simply referred to as the Unitarian Society. Because this antitrinitarian church community did not accept Jesus' divinity, it was refused approval by Parliament in 1897 as a Christian church upon revision of the Dissenter Act. Instead, it was approved as one among the country's non-Christian dissenter societies. The Unitarian Society was in existence until 1937, when the Unitarian pastor Herman Haugerud (1864–1937) died, leading to the closure of his congregation.

Among the most famous Norwegian Unitarians outside of the Unitarian Society were Nina and Edvard Grieg; they became familiar with Unitarians in Birmingham, England in 1888. Nina Grieg, after her husband's death, helped to finance the church building for the Danish Unitarians. Also in Oslo, Unitarians tried to erect a church building and money was collected. In this regard, the Hungarian Unitarian Church in 1909 sent contributions to the Unitarians in Oslo, and from then until today, there is close contact between the Norwegian and Transylvanian Unitarian Churches. For unknown reasons the planned church was never built.

=== Norwegian Unitarian Christianity today ===
In 1995, a hundred years after the first Unitarian Church (Broderskabets Church/Unitarian Society) was founded, part of this denomination re-emerged as a small Unitarian group in the Oslo area. On 1 January 2004 the religious community known as the Unitarian Union (The Norwegian Unitarian Church) was founded, establishing close contact with today's Transylvanian Unitarians in Hungary and Romania. In late April 2005 the church was registered with the County of Østfold, and the Royal Culture and Church Affairs granted exclusive rights to the name Unitarforbundet Beth David (of the Hebrew בֵּית דָּוִד, 'David's house'), which today is the church's official name. The more commonly used name today is simply the Norwegian Unitarian Church.

The first Norwegian baptism in a Hungarian Christian Unitarian church was performed on 12 April 2006, and from the introduction of the gender neutral Marriage Act in Norway in 2009 the church began to marry both same-sex and non-same-sex couples. In May 2009, it was decided by the Norwegian Unitarian group to establish a national umbrella organization, Unitarian Umbrella Organization of Norway, whose task is to be the official liaison between Norwegian Unitarians and the International Council of Unitarians and Universalists (ICUU).

=== Norwegian Unitarian Ministers ===
- Kristofer Janson (1841-1917), founder of the first Norwegian Unitarian Church (1895-1937).
- Herman Haugerud (1864-1937), last Unitarian minister of the first Norwegian Unitarian Church.
- Knut Heidelberg (1959 - ), one of the founders of the second Norwegian Unitarian Church (2005), served as Unitarian minister 2005-2009.
- Kjell Morten Bråten, present Unitarian minister of the second Norwegian Unitarian Church.
