= Forrest Church =

American writer and minister

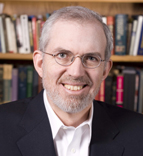
- Born: Frank Forrester Church IV; September 23, 1948; Palo Alto, California, U.S.
- Died: September 24, 2009 (aged 61); New York City, U.S.
- Resting place: Morris Hill Cemetery; Boise, Idaho
- Education: Stanford University (BA); Harvard University (MDiv, PhD)
- Occupations: minister, author, and theologian
- Employer(s): Unitarian Church of All Souls, New York City, New York
- Known for: Leading Unitarian Universalist theologian and author, prominent New York City religious figure
- Title: Minister of Public Theology
- Spouses: Carolyn Buck Luce (m. 1992–2009) Amy Furth Church (m. 1969–1991)
- Children: 4
- Parent(s): Frank Church; Bethine Clark
- Relatives: Chase A. Clark (grandfather)

Frank Forrester Church IV (September 23, 1948 – September 24, 2009) was a leading Unitarian Universalist minister, author, and theologian. He was Senior Minister of the Unitarian Church of All Souls in New York City, until late 2006 when he was appointed as Minister of Public Theology. He wrote about Christianity, Gnosticism, religious liberty in the US tradition, and his own father, a US Senator.

== Biography ==
Church was born in Palo Alto, California, while his father, Frank Church, was a student at Stanford Law School. Following graduation in 1950, the family returned to Boise, Idaho. His father was elected to the United States Senate in 1956 and served four terms, until January 1981.

Church was a graduate of Stanford University and Harvard Divinity School. He received a Ph.D. in early church history from Harvard University in 1978.

In 1991, Church's affair with a congregant brought his ability to serve as minister into question, but most of his congregation supported him.

On February 4, 2008, Church sent a letter to the members of his congregation informing them that he had terminal cancer. He told them of his intention, which he successfully realized, to sum up his thoughts on the topics that had been pervasive in his work in a final book, entitled Love & Death.

Church died of esophageal cancer in New York City on September 24, 2009, a day after his 61st birthday. He is buried in Morris Hill Cemetery in Boise.

== Writings ==
Church is best known as a leader of liberal religion. Between 1985 and his death, he wrote or edited more than 20 books. These include technical studies of Christian and Gnostic literature, as well as over a dozen books addressing a wider audience.

Books authored by Church include:

- Father and Son: A Personal Biography of Senator Frank Church of Idaho
- The trilogy A Humane Comedy: The Devil and Dr. Church, Entertaining Angels, and The Seven Deadly Virtues
- Early Christian Prayer
- Early Christian Hymns
- The Essential Tillich
- God and Other Famous Liberals: Recapturing Bible, Flag, and Family from the Far Right, Walker & Company, 1996 (ISBN 978-0802774835)
- A Chosen Faith: An Introduction to Unitarian Universalism, with John A. Buehrens, Beacon Press, 1998 (ISBN 0807016160)
- The American Creed: A Spiritual and Patriotic Primer, 2002 (ISBN 0-312-30344-0)
- So Help Me God: The Founding Fathers and the First Great Battle Over Church and State, 2007 (ISBN 978-0151011858)
- Freedom From Fear: Finding the Courage to Act, Love and Be (ISBN 0-312-32534-7)
- Love & Death, Beacon Press, 2008 (ISBN 0807072931)
- The Cathedral of the World: A Universalist Theology, Beacon Press, 2009 (ISBN 0807073237)

Books edited by Church:

- Restoring Faith: America's Religious Leaders Answer Terror with Hope, Walker & Company, 2001 (ISBN 978-0802776327)
- The Separation of Church and State: Writings on a Fundamental Freedom by America's Founders, Beacon Press, 2004 (ISBN 9780807077221)

== Television appearances ==
Church can be seen offering commentary in the History Channel documentaries Haunted History of Halloween and Christmas Unwrapped: The History of Christmas.
