= European Unitarian Universalists =

- Abbreviation: EUU
- Classification: Unitarian Universalism
- Associations: International Council of Unitarians and Universalists, Unitarian Universalist Association, General Assembly of Unitarian and Free Christian Churches
- Region: Continental Europe
- Origin: 1982
- Members: over 200
- Official website: www.europeanuu.org

The European Unitarian Universalists (EUU) is a network of English-speaking Unitarian Universalist fellowships and individuals in Western Continental Europe. It was founded in 1982 to provide support and religious community for expatriate American Unitarian Universalists in Europe, although it increasingly includes European natives.

About half of the over 200 members belong to lay-led fellowships that share resources and programs. The largest fellowship is in Paris (France). Other fellowships are located in different cities in Germany, the Netherlands, Belgium, Switzerland, and other countries. The EUU sponsors two continental gatherings per year and publishes a bi-monthly newsletter.
