= Unitarian Universalist Religious Society of Spain =

Attempt to organize Unitarian Universalism in Spain

The Unitarian Universalist Religious Society of Spain (Sociedad religiosa Unitaria Universalista de España, SUUE) was an attempt to organize Unitarian Universalism in Spain.

Although the SUUE became a member of the International Council of Unitarians and Universalists (ICUU) in June 2001 and had fellowships, first in Barcelona (founded in 2000), and then also in Madrid (founded in 2003), it did not achieve recognition as a religious organization from the Spanish government.

In 2001, Ángel Acebes, the Spanish Ministry of Justice denied the registration of SUUE as a religious organization in Spain on the grounds that it lacked a creed. This rejection was confirmed in 2006 by Spanish Ministry of Justice Fernando López Aguilar after a second request for legalization was made that emphasized the religious nature of the organization and its historical and denominational links.

Nowadays Spanish Unitarian Universalists (gathered still in 2 congregations, Madrid and Barcelona, after an unsuccessful attempt to create a third fellowship in A Coruña (2008)) are looking for alternate ways of legalization that preclude the existence of SUUE as it had been originally conceived by its promoters.
