= Flower Communion =

Ritual service in Unitarian Universalism

Flower Communion, also known as Flower Ceremony, Flower Festival, or Flower Celebration, is a ritual service common in Unitarian Universalism, though the specific practices vary between congregations. It is usually held on the last Sunday of worship in late May or June, as some congregations recess from holding services during the summer. Some congregations hold the ceremony earlier in the spring, sometimes coinciding with Mother's Day or Easter.

During the ritual, congregants contribute flowers to a central location, and later the flowers are distributed among the participants.

== History ==
The Flower Celebration as it is celebrated today was initiated in Prague on 4 June 1923 by Norbert Čapek, who was also the founder of the Unitarian Church in Czechoslovakia. He saw the need to unite the diverse congregants of his church, from varying Protestant, Catholic, and Jewish backgrounds, without alienating those who had left these traditions. For this reason he turned to the beauty of nature and had a communion of flowers instead of the Eucharist. Though Unitarian Universalists often refer to the ritual as a Flower Ceremony, Festival, or Communion, Čapek's term "Oslava Květin" is more accurately translated as "Flower Celebration", a term which continues to be preferred by Czech Unitarians today.

The ritual was brought to the United States in 1940 by the Rev. Maja Čapek, Norbert's wife, with the first flower communion being observed in Cambridge, Massachusetts. It was widely adopted by the American Unitarian churches, and their successor Unitarian Universalist congregations.

The ritual was later brought from the United States to Britain by Rev. Eric Shirvell Price.

Earlier Unitarian "Flower Services", documented in Midwestern U.S. Unitarian congregations beginning circa 1880, were somewhat different in form from Čapek's service.

A floral arrangement created for a Flower Communion at a Unitarian Universalist Church for Easter celebrations 2009

== Ritual ==
In its essentials, the ritual involves the following:

- Each congregant brings a flower to be used in the service
- Congregants leave their flowers in a central location either as they enter or during the service
- Towards the end of the service, the flowers are distributed or congregants come forward and choose a flower different from the one they brought.

The actual order of service varies widely in different congregations, and often closely resembles the ordinary order of service. Other service elements might include a sermon, the blessing of or a prayer over the flowers, a reading by Norbert Čapek, the history of the ritual, and hymns.

Many congregations include this blessing used by Čapek to consecrate the flowers before they are passed to or distributed among the people:

Infinite Spirit of Life, we ask thy blessing on these, thy messengers of fellowship and love. May they remind us, amid diversities of knowledge and of gifts, to be one in desire and affection, and devotion to thy holy will. May they also remind us of the value of comradeship, of doing and sharing alike. May we cherish friendship as one of thy most precious gifts. May we not let awareness of another's talents discourage us, or sully our relationship, but may we realize that, whatever we can do, great or small, the efforts of all of us are needed to do thy work in this world.

== Symbolism ==
As with the flaming chalice there is no one orthodox interpretation of this flower ritual.

The beauty and diversity of flowers is seen as symbolic of the beauty and diversity of life, and how each individual is a unique whole unto themselves. Czech Unitarian Iva Fišerová has written: "The flower is the most beloved symbol for Czech Unitarians... The symbol of various unique beings—flowers/people—uniting to create a unique bouquet... Parting and being given a flower as a symbol of anybody in attendance whom I am expected to accept as my brother or sister."

Additionally, the choice and contribution of a flower by each congregant symbolizes the free will with which the congregant approaches the ceremony. Joining the flowers in a shared location represents the equality of people.
