= Unitarier - Religionsgemeinschaft freien Glaubens =

German Unitarian organization

- The official logo of the DUR
- Abbreviation: DUR
- Type: religious organization
- Orientation: Unitarianism, Free Religious
- Associations: International Council of Unitarians and Universalists
- Region: Germany
- Language: German
- Origin: 1876; Rheinhessen
- Separated from: Evangelical Church in Hessen
- Official website: www.unitarier.de

Unitarier - Religionsgemeinschaft freien Glaubens ("Unitarians - Religious Community of Free Faith") is a unitarian religious organization in Germany. It was founded in 1876 in Germany's Rheinhessen region under the name Religionsgemeinschaft Freier Protestanten ("Religious Community of Free Protestants"). Between 1950 and 2015 the organization was called Deutsche Unitarier Religionsgemeinschaft ("German Unitarian Religious Community").

The Unitarier are a liberal, non-Christian religious community that has been described as both pantheistic and humanistic. They do not have any dogmas, but the community has a set of non-binding basic principles (Grundgedanken) that the members have agreed upon.

== History ==
The organization was founded in 1876 in Germany's Rheinhessen region under the name Religionsgemeinschaft Freier Protestanten ("Religious Community of Free Protestants"). In 1911 their newspaper took on the subtitle "Deutsch-Unitarische Blätter" ("German Unitarian Gazette") because leader Rudolf Walbaum wanted to connect to American Unitarians. In 1950 they changed their name to Deutsche Unitarier Religionsgemeinschaft ("German Unitarian Religious Community").

By 1977, the group was led by Friedrich Ehrlicher who was a former Nazi. In 1989, an extremely rightist group led by Sigrid Hunke left and founded "Bund Deutscher Unitarier, Religionsgemeinschaft europäischen Geistes". In a declaration from 2011, the organization expressed regret for the fact that it took until the late 1980s to separate itself from the rightists, and declared that there is no place in the organization for "antidemocratic, extremist or neofascist ideologies".

== Theology ==
Most members have either pantheistic or atheistic views. The community is open to members irrespective of their theological views, and supports religious pluralism.

== Organization ==
Congregations are lay-led. It is the only Unitarian group in Germany to belong to the ICUU.

== Bibliography ==
Gunde Hartmann, Ed. (2000) "Was glauben Sie eigentlich?" Hamburg/Ravensberg: Verlag Deutsche Unitarier
