= Unitarisk Kirkesamfund =

Danish Unitarian Church

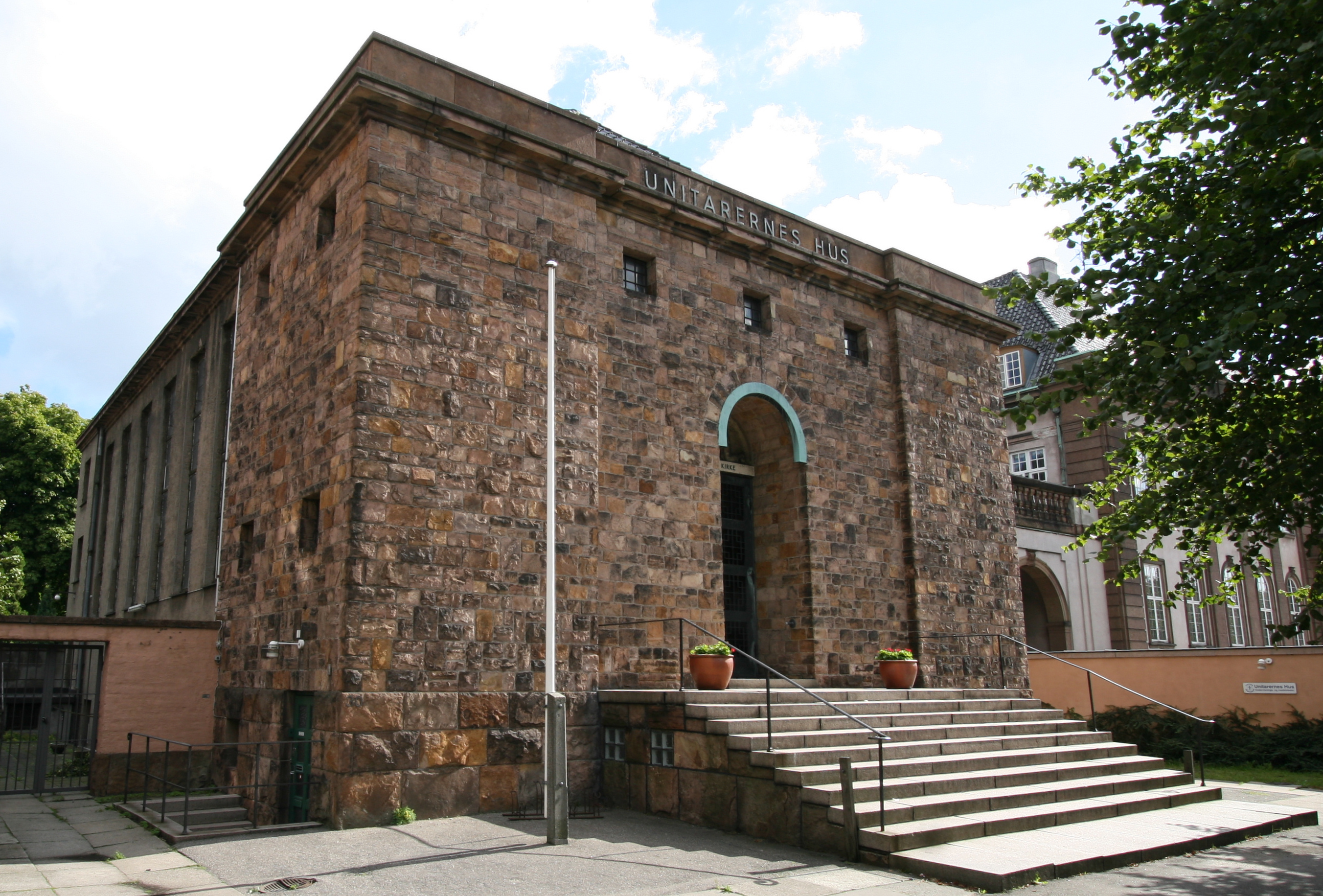
House of Unitarians, 30 Dag Hammarskjölds Allé, Copenhagen

Unitarisk Kirkesamfund (English: Unitarian Church Society) is the Danish Unitarian Church, founded on 18 May 1900 as "Det fri Kirkesamfund" (literally, The Free Congregation) by a group of liberal Christians. In 1992 they changed the name to the now "Unitarisk Kirkesamfund".

Since 1908, the church has been outside the Church of Denmark. Unitarisk Kirkesamfund is a member and co-founder of the International Association for Religious Freedom and the International Council of Unitarians and Universalists.
