= Idaho Conservation League =

Non-profit organization in the USA

- Abbreviation: ICL
- Formation: 1973
- Type: 501(c)(3) nonprofit organization
- Purpose: Environmental conservation, protection of Idaho's water, wilderness, and wildlife
- Headquarters: Boise, Idaho, United States
- Region served: Idaho, United States
- Key people: Brad Smith (Conservation Director)

The Idaho Conservation League (ICL) is a 501(c)(3) non-profit organization devoted to protecting Idaho's environment. "The ICL preserves Idaho's clean water, wilderness and quality of life through citizen action, public education, and professional advocacy." The majority of ICL’s funding comes from members in Idaho and supports conservation programs aimed at protecting clean water, clean air, public lands, wildlife, and Idaho's wild landscapes.

== History ==
Several of their main achievements since then can be seen below.

- 1970s – Preservation of the 2.3 million-acre Frank Church-River of No Return Wilderness
- 1980s – Helped pass the Idaho Clean Lakes and Water Quality Act
- 1990s – Helped revise the Idaho Forest Practices Act
- 2000s – Helped pass the Owyhee Canyonlands Wilderness Bill, the first wilderness designation in Idaho in 29 years

== Issues ==
=== Water ===
One of the main issues that the Idaho Conservation League focuses on is protecting water quality; ICL has worked to protect watersheds all over the state from mining pollution. In Southwest Idaho, the Boise River is the primary source of drinking water for thousands of people and ICL has worked to protect this water source from potential mining contamination. To protect the Boise River, ICL is appealing a decision made by the Forest Service to allow a mining company to begin exploration in the Boise National Forest near the river's headwaters. In East Idaho ICL worked with Monsanto, a phosphate mining company, to encourage Idaho to adopt stricter mercury regulation. In North Idaho, the Idaho Conservation League has worked to clean up residual mining pollution in Lake Coeur d'Alene.

Other threats from mining that ICL has worked to resolve are mercury contamination and acid mine drainage. "It was ICL that succeeded in getting rules enacted that reduced the discharge of mercury from gold mines in the state of Nevada (a 50-percent decrease in airborne emissions) that poisoned and are still poisoning Idaho lakes and streams."

In addition to protecting against mining contamination, Idaho Conservation League works to protect Idaho's ground water from hydraulic fracturing, otherwise known as "fracking", a process used in natural gas extraction. When a natural gas company began exploration in western Idaho in 2011, ICL asked the Idaho oil and Gas Conservation Commission to prohibit carcinogenic chemicals and require companies to provide a bond protecting Idaho communities in the case of a fracking emergency. ICL has one main goal in regards to fracking, that "Idaho has rules protective of the people's groundwater" that set limitations on the use of hazardous substances.

Idaho Conservation League believes that there should be a balance when it comes to resource extraction that allows for both economic development and resource protection, to ensure that the health of Idaho families and Idaho's clean water is not jeopardized.

=== Wild landscapes ===
One of Idaho Conservation League's most recent successes was the protection of the Owyhee Wilderness in Southwest Idaho as part of the Owyhee Initiative. The Owyhee Wilderness, which was signed into law in 2009, is the first wilderness area to be designated in Idaho since the early 1980s. This designation will ensure that "517,000 acres of Wilderness and over 316 miles of rivers as Wild and Scenic Rivers will be protected in perpetuity for future generations," and public accessibility to these areas will increase from the creation of seven new public right of ways.

Idaho Conservation League also works all across Idaho to protect the state's wild landscapes. In South Idaho, ICL is working to prevent a new wind farm development at China Mountain. Although ICL supports renewable energies including wind and solar generation because they protect Idaho's clean air, China Mountain is home to an abundance of wildlife species including elk and sage grouse. ICL believes that new wind projects should not jeopardize intact wilderness lands or wildlife habitat and advocate for new projects to be places on lands already converted to human uses such as agricultural fields.

In North-Central Idaho, ICL is working with a variety of stakeholders as part of the Clearwater Basin Collaborative (CBC). The CBC "was established in 2008 to bring together representatives from business, conservation, government and tribal interests to resolve land management conflicts in the Clearwater Basin." The group is currently working on an agreement that will protect the landscape while also allowing for recreation, rural economic development, and forest health and management.

In Central Idaho, Idaho Conservation League is currently leading the effort to establish the Boulder White Clouds Wilderness by supporting the Central Idaho Economic Development and Recreation Act (CIEDRA). This bill, sponsored by Idaho Rep. Mike Simpson, has been under consideration for several years and has been introduced to congress during each of Simpson's terms. The bill, once approved, would provide for "voluntary retirement of grazing allotments, grants for local community development, preservation of some off-road vehicle routes, and small land conveyances for local parks and other public works."

== Staff ==
In December 2023, Brad Smith was announced as the conservation director for ICL.

In August 2020, Idaho Conservation League added new staff namely, Dainee Gibson and Katie Jay.
