= Flaming chalice =

Symbol of Unitarianism and Unitarian Universalism

An early logo of the Unitarian Universalist Association which includes a flaming chalice

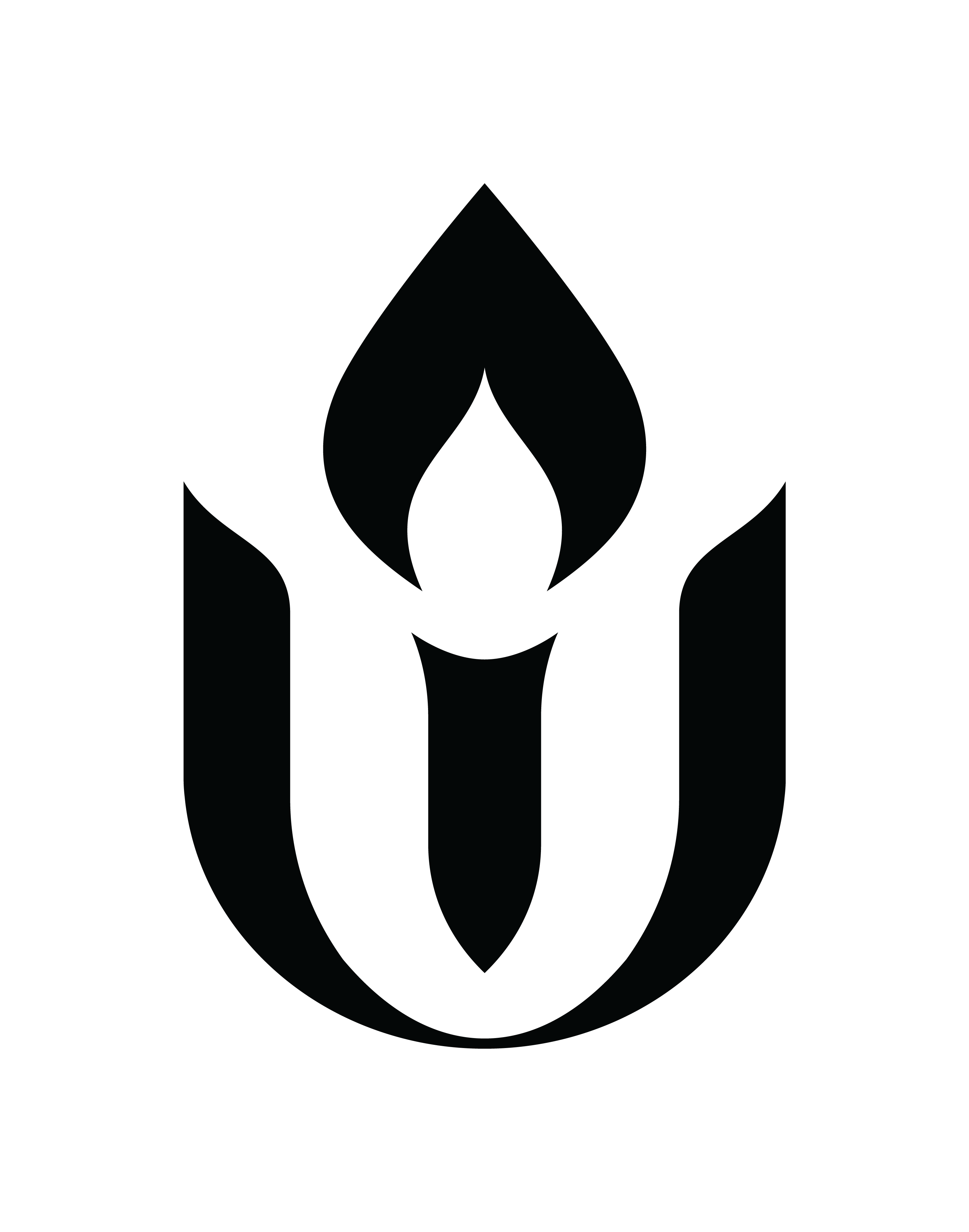
Another logo

A flaming chalice is the most widely used symbol of Unitarianism and Unitarian Universalism (UUism) and the official logo of the Unitarian Universalist Association (UUA) and other Unitarian and UU churches and societies.

== Origins ==
The symbol had its origins in a logo designed by an artist named Hans Deutsch for the Unitarian Service Committee (USC) (now the Unitarian Universalist Service Committee) during World War II. According to USC director Charles Joy, Deutsch took his inspiration from the chalices of oil burned on ancient Greek and Roman altars. It became an underground symbol in occupied Europe during World War II for those assisting Unitarians, Jews, and other people to escape Nazi persecution. The Unitarian Universalist Association has stated that Deutsch had borrowed aspects of the symbol from Czechoslovakia, where it was seen as an "old symbol of strength and freedom."

...Joy asked an artist and an employee of the Unitarian Service Committee, Hans Deutsch, to design a symbol that would be placed on all Unitarian documents. Deutsch was a refugee from Paris who had been a successful painter and musician. Living in Paris during the 1930’s Deutsch drew critical cartoons of Adolf Hitler. When the Nazis invaded Paris in 1940, he abandoned all he had and fled to the South of France, then to Spain, and finally, with an altered passport, into Portugal. It was there that he met Joy, who, was then European commissioner of the Unitarian Service Committee and was busy overseeing a secret network of couriers and agents.

After 1941, the flaming chalice symbol spread throughout Unitarianism in America and the rest of the world. This spread continued after Unitarians in North America merged with Universalists to form the Unitarian Universalist Association. The symbol gradually became more than a printed logo. By the 1960s, people like Fred Weideman of Dearborn, Michigan, were making flaming chalice jewelry. Some congregations began displaying the symbol in their worship spaces. At some point, three-dimensional chalices were made to be lit during worship services, but the origin(s) of this usage remains obscure.

Former President of the UUA John A. Buehrens has stated:

The chalice is cruciform, but set off center within circles, just as the Universalists once represented their Christian heritage as but one part of a larger, more universal whole. Its light evokes the eternal flame in the ancient temple at Jerusalem, as well as the lamp of reason, and the flames on the many altars of faith--all very real sources of our living tradition.

== Interpretation ==
This symbol of Christian Universalism was already in use decades prior to the creation of the Unitarian Universalist Association.

The chalice is off center. This was taken from the Universalist symbol, the Off-Center Cross. The interpretation of the Off-Center Cross is that, while Universalism is based in Christianity, there is room for the Love and Wisdom of other religions.

The chalice symbol is often shown surrounded by two linked rings (see illustration). The two linked rings were based on the quote from the poet and lifelong Universalist Edwin Markham, "He drew a circle that shut me out—Heretic, rebel, a thing to flout. But Love and I had the wit to win: We drew a circle and took him in!" It also served as a symbol signifying the joining of Unitarianism and Universalism in 1961. In August 1962, the newsletter of the Midwestern Unitarian Universalist Association began using a chalice symbol drawn inside the two interlocking rings, as drawn by Betty King.

There is no orthodox interpretation of the flaming chalice symbol. In one interpretation, the chalice is a symbol of religious freedom from the impositions of doctrine by a hierarchy and open to participation by all; the flame is interpreted as a memorial to those throughout history who sacrificed their lives for the cause of religious liberty. In another interpretation, the flaming chalice resembles a cross, symbolic of the Christian roots of Unitarian and Universalism.

Later, associations were made between this symbol and the Hussites religious sect. Czech reformer Jan Hus (1369–1415) began reading the Bible to his congregations in their native language, while the Catholic Church demanded that the Bible only be read in Latin. Also, during communion, the chalice was reserved for the clergy; the laity only received bread. When a church council condemned the practice of priests who were giving the chalice to their congregants, Hus refused to support the condemnation. After his execution by burning in 1415, followers of Hus adopted the "lay chalice" as an important symbol of their movement.

== Usage ==
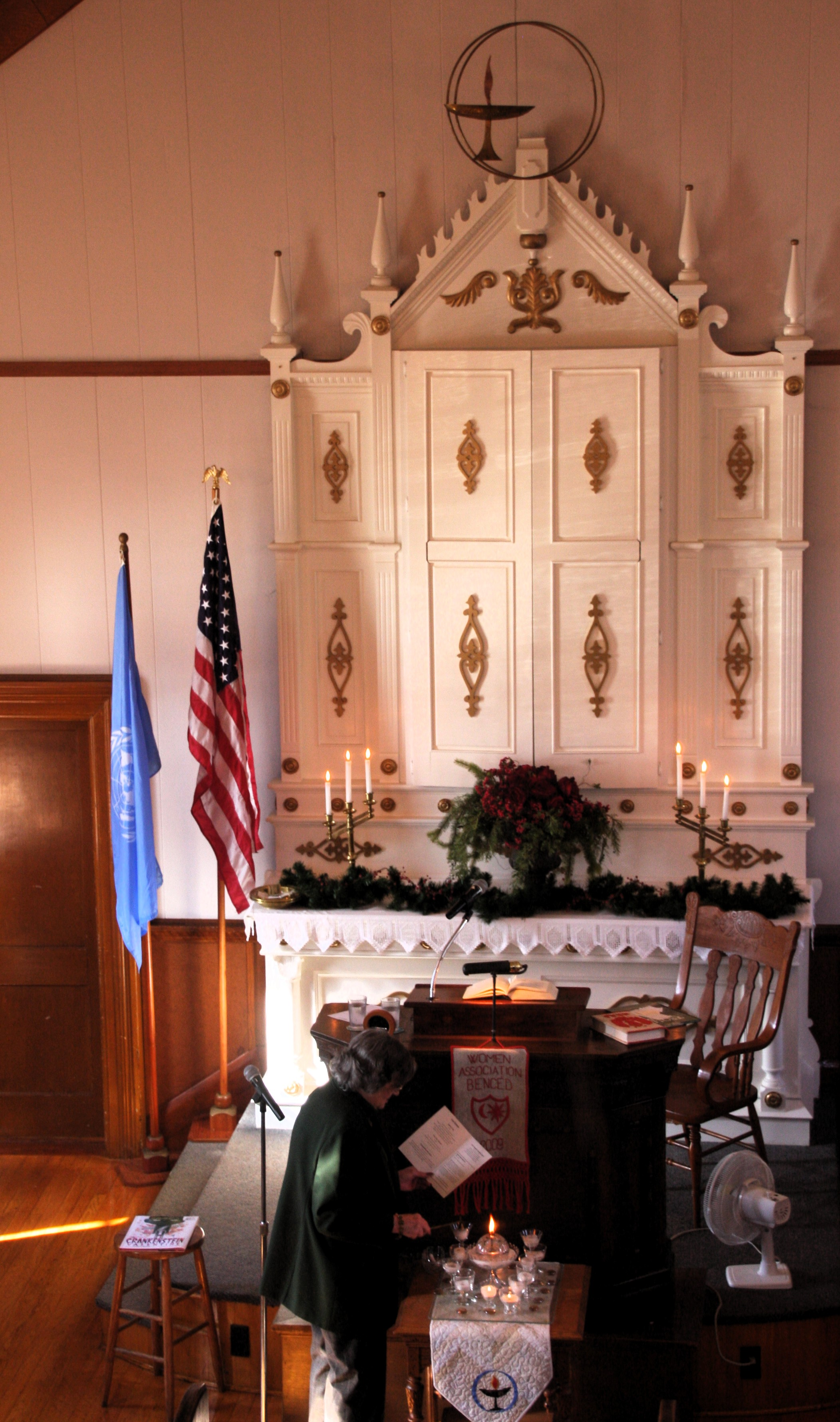
Service leader preparing to extinguish the flaming chalice at Nora UU Church in Minnesota

=== Ceremonial lighting ===
Many Unitarian Universalist and Unitarian congregations and organizations feature flaming chalice symbolism on their signs, logos, and in their meeting places. Some congregations light a chalice displayed prominently in their worship space while saying opening words at the beginning of weekly worship services. The texts used during these "chalice lightings" vary; some congregations use a ritual formula while at others these words are spoken extemporaneously.

Outside of weekly worship services, many small gatherings of Unitarian Universalists incorporate a lit chalice, often accompanied by readings, as a reminder of the religious nature of the gathering. Unitarian Universalists, Unitarians and Universalists might also display a flaming chalice on clothing, jewelry, their cars, or in their homes as a symbol of their faith, much as Christians display a cross or as Jews display a Star of David.

In keeping with the traditions of religious pluralism and individualism, there is no requirement, doctrinal or otherwise, that congregations or adherents use or acknowledge the flaming chalice as a religious symbol.

=== United States Department of Veterans Affairs ===
The flaming chalice has been approved by the United States Department of Veterans Affairs for use as the cemetery emblem for fallen veterans who identify themselves with the Unitarian or Unitarian Universalist faith tradition.
