= Unitarian Union of North East India =

Unitarian church based in Meghalaya, India

- Formation: 1887; 139 years ago
- Founder: Hajjom Kissor Singh
- Location: India
- Region served: Khasi Hills, Meghalaya
- Affiliations: Unitarianism
- Formerly called: Khasi Hills Unitarian Union

The Unitarian Union of North East India (UUNEI), formerly the Khasi Hills Unitarian Union, is a Unitarian church based in the Khasi Hills in Meghalaya, India. It was founded by Hajjom Kissor Singh in 1887.

== Recognition ==
Unitarian Day, held annually on 18 September in honor of the church's founding, has been a state holiday in Meghalaya since 1908.

== Size ==
The UUNEI is the third or fourth largest Unitarian community in the world (estimates of member numbers differ), behind the United States and Romania. A 2011 estimate put the UUNEI at 45 congregations and 10,000 members, while a 2021 estimate put the number of churches in the KUU at more than 35.

== History ==
The Khasi Hills Unitarian community was founded by Hajjom Kissor Singh (15 June 1865 – 13 November 1923) in 1887. Kissor Singh had been raised in a family which practiced traditional Khasi religion, but after he and his brother were sent to a missionary school, he converted to the Welsh Calvinistic Methodist Church at age 15. He became dissatisfied with the doctrine he was taught, and became determined to leave them to find "the true religion of Jesus, the love of God".

Much of Kissor Singh's early independent religious study was influenced by correspondence with Unitarian minister Charles Dall, who was working as a missionary in Calcutta. In 1887, Kissor Singh decided to found a new religious movement under the name Ka Niam Unitarian (the Unitarian religion) with the assistance of American Unitarians, defining it as "duty to God, to fellow humans and to oneself". He led the movement's first service at his home in Jowai, attended by two men and one woman, on September 18, 1887. By 1889, the group had grown enough to build their own church building in Nongtalang.

The American Unitarians also sent Kissor Singh money to print 500 copies of a Khasi language hymnbook in 1892. Kissor Singh translated many of the hymns himself. By 1899, the church had 214 members.

By the 1910s, charity initiatives were organized by Khasi Unitarian women, such as one initiative where women put aside a handful of rice from each meal to give to community members in need. In 1923, a Unitarian church was established in Nongthymmai.

By 2011, the UUNEI's mother church in Jowai had 1,000 congregants. In 2012, in honor of the church's 125th anniversary, they organized a 4K run to raise awareness of environmental issues.

=== Education ===
The Jowai group opened a free co-ed school in August 1893, headed by a female teacher. Initially serving twenty students, after two years the school had 60 students taught by four teachers. By the 1910s, the church was also leading various night and day schools and music classes.

An official education committee of UUNEI was founded later. In 1982, the committee established 10 schools, expanding to more than 15 schools by 1992. The committee currently oversees two higher secondary schools, five secondary schools, ten upper primary schools, and 33 lower primary schools. The schools are located in East Khasi Hills district, West Jaintia Hills district, and Ri-Bhoi district in Meghalaya, and Karbi Anglong district in Assam.

== Theology ==
The Khasi Unitarian statement of faith, published in 1888, reads: "We believe (1) in the unity of God; (2) in the Fatherhood and Motherhood of God; (3) in the Brotherhood of Man; (4) in Love, Union, Worship, and Faith; and (5) in Immortality". Additional catechism is drawn from The Book of Brief Questions About Unitarianism, which was co-written by Kissor Singh and Robin Roy. The book is split into six chapters: chapters one and two deal with "the subject of God," chapters three, four, and five address duties to God, other people, and the self, while the final chapter addresses sin, "defined as not doing one's duty, or going against the commands of God".

Khasi Unitarianism merges elements of traditional Khasi religious teachings and practices with Christian practices (Sunday services, ministerial hierarchy, and church buildings, among others) brought to the region by missionaries.
