= List of Unitarian, Universalist, and Unitarian Universalist churches =

This is a list of Unitarian, Universalist, and Unitarian Universalist churches. Various congregations (churches, societies, fellowships, etc.) and/or individual churches as buildings, of these related religious groups have historic or other significance.

Numerous Unitarian churches are notable for having historic buildings, and there are former church buildings that are historic as well. There are numerous Unitarian churches that are listed buildings in England, that are listed on the National Register of Historic Places in the United States, or that are noted on other historic registers.

This article includes churches notable either as congregations or as buildings or as both.

== Australia ==
Church	Image	Dates	Location	City, State	Description
Unitarian Church of South Australia		1855 founded 1972 current building	34.9259°S 138.6321°E	Norwood, South Australia	Founded in Adelaide 1855 as the Unitarian Christian Church; original church building in Wakefield Street 1857, sold 1971, demolished 1973. Current building 1972 at 99 Osmond Tce, Norwood.
Melbourne Unitarian Peace Memorial Church		1852 founded 1964 current building	37.8112°S 144.9849°E	East Melbourne, Victoria	Founded in Melbourne 1852 as the Unitarian Church; original church building in Cathedral Place. Current building 1964 at 110 Grey St, East Melbourne.

== Canada ==
This is a list intended to cover notable Canadian Unitarian Universalist (UU) churches as either congregations or as buildings or as both. UU congregations in Canada are members of the Canadian Unitarian Council (CUC). The CUC is made up of 46 member congregations and emerging groups.

Church	Image	Dates	Location	City, Provence	Description
First Unitarian Congregation of Ottawa		1898 founded 1967 current building		Ottawa, Ontario	Congregation Founded in 1898. Current building constructed in 1967, it's memorable for its soaring spire and beautiful interior design. Architect, James B. Craig, won second place in an annual city design contest run by the Ottawa chapter of the Ontario Association of Architects for his work on the building.
First Unitarian Congregation of Toronto		1845 founded 1960s current building	43°41′28″N 79°26′23″W	Toronto, Ontario	Founded in 1845, the second one in Canada following the congregation in Montreal. Its current building is a former postal sorting station.
Unitarian Church of Montreal		1842 founded		Montreal, Quebec	The first Unitarian church in Canada, founded in 1842.
Vancouver Unitarians		1909 founded	49°13′36″N 123°07′48″W	Vancouver, British Columbia	Founded in 1909. Currently the largest UU congregation in Canada by official membership numbers, with 368 members.
Universalist Unitarian Community of Halifax		1837 founded		Halifax, Nova Scotia	The first Universalist church in Canada, founded in 1837. Current building is registered as a historic place with the province of Nova Scotia.

== India ==
Indian Council of Unitarian Churches —ICUU

- Unitarian Union of North East India: 9,000 members
- The Unitarian Christian Church of Chennai

== Indonesia ==
Jemaat Allah Global Indonesia (JAGI), internationally known as Unitarian Christian Church of Indonesia (UCCI), was founded in 1998 and formally registered in 2000, headquarter in Semarang, Java, includes several congregations, member of ICUU. For the church are observed some Law of Moses practices, such as dietary laws and seventh-day Sabbath.

== Ireland ==
Unitarian Church in Ireland, consisting of two churches, part of the Non-subscribing Presbyterian Church of Ireland.

== Philippines ==
The Unitarian Universalist Church of the Philippines, Inc. Status: Full Member Members: 2000 Ministers: 34 Founded: The Universalist Church of the Philippines was started in 1954 by Rev. Toribio S. Quimada (d. 1988; martyred). In 1954, the Church was affiliated with the Universalist Church of America. In 1988, UUCP was admitted as a member congregation of the UUA. In 1995, UUCP was one of the founding churches of the ICUU. Congregations: 30

== Romania ==
The Unitarian Church of Transylvania includes a number of individual churches, several with notable historic murals.

Church	Image	Dates	Location	City, State	Description
Unitarian church, Dârjiu		13th century		Dârjiu	Unitarian fortified church, which is on UNESCO's World Heritage List. Murals, dating back to the Roman Catholic period, show King Ladislaus I of Hungary's legend.
Unitarian church, Braşov				Braşov	
Unitarian church, Cluj-Napoca				Cluj-Napoca	
Unitarian church, Crăciunel				Crăciunel	Has notable mural
Unitarian church, Cristuru Secuiesc				Cristuru Secuiesc	Has notable mural
Unitarian church, Inlăceni				Inlăceni	Ceiling has a statement rendered in Old Hungarian script
Unitarian church, Mugeni				Mugeni	Has notable mural
Unitarian church, Rugăneşti				Rugăneşti	Has notable mural
Unitarian church, Şimoneşti				Şimoneşti	

== Russia ==
Church	Image	Dates	Location	City, State	Description
The Church of Evangelical Christians in the Spirit of the Apostles, Saint Petersburg		1911 founded	Vyborgsky District; 60.025237°N 30.326531°E	Saint Petersburg	

== South Africa ==
The Unitarian Community of Cape Town is the founding site for Unitarianism in South Africa, started in 1867 by Rev. David Faure. It is a welcoming congregation.

== United Kingdom ==
The General Assembly of Unitarian and Free Christian Churches counts about 180 churches as members. The following have articles on Wikipedia:

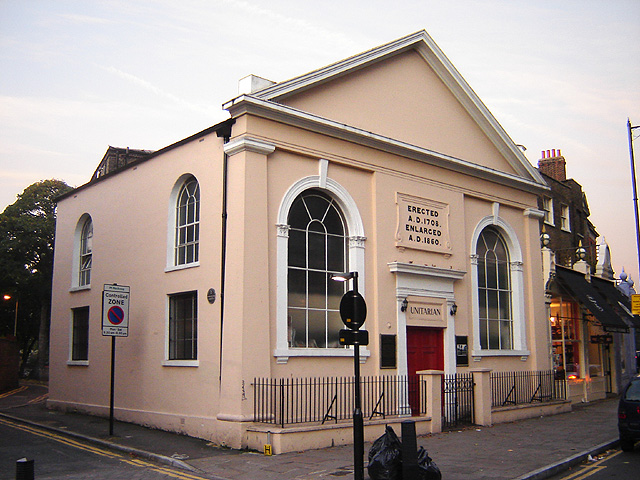
Newington Green Unitarian Church

- Billingshurst Unitarian Chapel, West Sussex (1754)
- Brighton Unitarian Church, 1820, built by Amon Henry Wilds
- Chowbent Chapel, Atherton, Greater Manchester, England. Building dates from 1721. Building designated a Grade II* Listed building in 1966.
- Cross Street Chapel, Manchester. The Dissenters' Meeting House was opened in 1694 and holds a special place in the growth of nonconformism within the city. It became a Unitarian meeting-house c.1761. It was wrecked by a Jacobite mob in 1715, rebuilt and destroyed during a World War II air raid in December 1940. A new building was constructed in 1959 and the present structure dates from 1997
- Ditchling Unitarian Chapel, East Sussex (c. 1730)
- Essex Church, the first Unitarian church in England, moved in 1880s from central London to Kensington
- Horsham Unitarian Church, West Sussex (1719)
- Newington Green Unitarian Church, north London
- Octagon Chapel, Norwich
- Richmond & Putney Unitarian Church, Richmond, London, dating from 1896
- Rivington Unitarian Chapel, near Manchester
- Todmorden Unitarian Church, in Yorkshire
- Underbank Chapel, in Sheffield
- Unitarian Chapel, Liverpool
- Upper Chapel, in Sheffield

== United States ==
This is a list intended to cover notable churches, including many that are listed on the U.S. National Register of Historic Places.

(by state then city)

Church	Image	Dates	Location	City, State	Description
Anchorage Unitarian Universalist Fellowship		1955 founded		Anchorage, Alaska	Congregation made headlines in 2006 for its voluntary "payment in lieu of taxes" to its city government.
Unitarian Universalist Church in Anaheim			511 S. Harbor Boulevard	Anaheim, California	
Humboldt Unitarian Universalist Fellowship			24 Fellowship Way	Bayside, California	
First Unitarian Church (Berkeley, California)		1898 built 1981 NRHP-listed	2401 Bancroft Way; 37°52′7″N 122°15′36″W	Berkeley, California	Building now belongs to University of California
Unitarian Universalist Church of Berkeley		1891 founded, 1961 moved from Berkeley	1 Lawson Road	Kensington, California	Often abbreviated UUCB. Certified membership 2012-13 was 459
Unitarian Universalist Congregation in Fullerton			109 E. Wilshire Avenue	Fullerton, California	
Unitarian Universalist Church in Livermore		1963 founded 1977 first permanent church 2007 expanded facility	1893 N. Vasco Road	Livermore, California	Often abbreviated UUCiL. Certified membership 2012-13 was 158.
Unitarian Universalist Congregation of Marin				San Rafael, Marin County, California	Often abbreviated UUCM. Certified membership 2012-13 was 154.
Unitarian Universalist Society of San Francisco		1850 founded. The present church Sanctuary (the third built by the congregation) was dedicated in 1889.	1187 Franklin Street	San Francisco, California	The First Unitarian Church is a church structure built in 1889 and is located at 1187 Franklin Street at Geary Street in the Cathedral Hill neighborhood, San Francisco, California. It is also known the First Unitarian Universalist Church, and is nicknamed "Starr King's church".
Unitarian Universalist Fellowship of Stanislaus County		1953 founded		Near Modesto, California	The only Unitarian Universalist congregation in Stanislaus County, which is within California's Central Valley. Has oldest building of any church in the county, owned by this congregation since the 1960s.
First Unitarian Church of Los Angeles		1877 founded 1887 first permanent church, later destroyed by fire 1927 relocation to current building	2936 West 8th Street	Koreatown, Los Angeles, California	Founded by Caroline Severance on March 7, 1877. Embracing of progressive causes and sometimes radical politics have earned it a reputation as both a place of controversy and a beacon of justice.
Sepulveda Unitarian Universalist Society		1943 founded 1964 built	9550 N. Haskell Avenue; 34°14′39″N 118°28′32″W	North Hills, Los Angeles, California	Building, known as "the Onion," is a Los Angeles Historic-Cultural Monument; in 1966 was the site of an Acid Test.
Throop Unitarian Universalist Church of Pasadena		1887 founded		Pasadena, California	was founded in 1887 by Amos Throop and is the largest ex-Universalist church building west of the Mississippi River. Certified membership 2012-13 was 49.
Unitarian Universalists of Petaluma		2002 founded		Petaluma, California	Founded in 2002 by four Petaluma families, and has grown to a membership of over 100 as of 2023. UU Petaluma acquired the historic 1901 Congregational church in 2021, designed by Brainerd Jones.
Pacific Unitarian Church		1957 founded 1965 building built		Rancho Palos Verdes, California	Recognized as a "Breakthrough Congregations" in 2008 based on growth, ministry, and donations.
First Unitarian Church of Oakland		1891 built 1977 NRHP-listed	685 14th Street; 37°48′23″N 122°16′36″W	Oakland, California	Certified membership 2012-13 was 300.
Universalist Unitarian Church of Riverside		1892 built 1978 NRHP-listed	33°58′56″N 117°22′17″W	Riverside, California	Norman English Gothic architecture, built of Permian age red sandstone from Arizona
First Unitarian Universalist Society of San Francisco				San Francisco, California	Certified membership 2012-13 was 340.
First Unitarian Church of San Jose		1892 built 1977 NRHP-listed	160 N. Third Street; 37°20′23.02″N 121°53′23.65″W	San Jose, California	Certified membership 2012-13 was 267.
Unitarian Universalist Congregation of Santa Rosa		1954 founded 1961 first facility 2004 current facility	547 Mendocino Avenue; 38°26′36.32″N 122°42′59.20″W	Santa Rosa, California	Certified membership 2016 was 345. Largest UU congregation in the North Bay; second largest UU congregation in the San Francisco Bay Area.
Unitarian Universalists of San Mateo, California		1952 founded 1905 building built	300 East Santa Inez Avenue	San Mateo, California	In 1971 this church, founded in 1952, purchased a former Methodist, Carpenter Gothic whose construction was started in 1905.
Mount Diablo Unitarian Universalist Church		1959 founded 2000 building built	55 Eckley Lane	Walnut Creek, California	Certified membership 2012-13 was 455.
Unitarian Meetinghouse		1771 built 1972 NRHP-listed	41°47′15.31″N 71°57′0.16″W	Brooklyn, Connecticut	
Unitarian-Universalist Church (Stamford, Connecticut)		1870 built 1987 NRHP-listed	20 Forest St. 41°3′27″N 73°32′14″W	Stamford, Connecticut	Gothic, English Country Gothic architecture
Unitarian Society Hartford		1830 founded	50 Bloomfield Ave.	Hartford, Connecticut	
Unitarian Universalist Society: East		1969 founded 1979 built	153 Vernon St. W	Manchester, Connecticut	
Universalist Church of West Hartford		1821 founded	41.769°N 72.7404°W	West Hartford, Connecticut	
The Unitarian Church in Westport		1949 founded	10 Lyons Plains Road	Westport, Connecticut	
Unitarian Universalist Church of Fort Myers				Fort Myers, Florida	
First Unitarian Universalist Congregation of the Palm Beaches				North Palm Beach, Florida	
Unitarian Universalist Church of Pensacola		1958 founded	9888 Pensacola Boulevard	Pensacola, Florida	Serves congregants from Escambia and Santa Rosa Counties in Florida and Baldwin County, Alabama.
Unitarian Universalist Church of Tarpon Springs		1882 founded	230 Grand Boulevard	Tarpon Springs, Florida	One of the oldest UU churches in the South, home of Inness paintings.
Rockwell Universalist Church		1881 built 1985 NRHP-listed	34°2′7″N 83°42′49″W	Winder, Georgia	Greek Revival
Unitarian Universalist Congregation of Atlanta		1965 built; 2018 move to new building	1911 Cliff Valley Way NE	Atlanta, Georgia	
First Unitarian Church of Honolulu		1952 founded	2500 Pali Highway; 21°19.799′N 157°50.678′W	Honolulu, Hawaii	Only Universalist church in the state. In 1969, church offered refuge to U.S. service members protesting the war in Vietnam; the service members were arrested by military police within the church grounds.
Unity Temple		1905-08 built 1970 NRHP-listed	875 Lake St. 41°53′18″N 87°47′48″W	Oak Park, Illinois	Building, designed by Frank Lloyd Wright, is a U.S. National Historic Landmark. Reopened in 2017 after restoration
First Unitarian Church of Chicago		1836 founded		Hyde Park, Chicago, Chicago, Illinois	
Beverly Unitarian Church		1874 founded		Beverly, Chicago, Chicago, Illinois	
Universalist Church/Arthur Stark House		1855 built 1978 CP-NRHP-listed		Sycamore, Illinois	Contributing property in NRHP-listed Sycamore Historic District
Unitarian Church of Urbana		1908 built 1991 NRHP-listed	1209 W. Oregon St. 40°6′24″N 88°13′30″W	Urbana, Illinois	Bungalow/craftsman, Gothic, Tudor Revival in style
Unitarian Fellowship of Elkhart		1961 founded	1732 Garden Street	Elkhart, Indiana	
First Unitarian Church of Hobart		1875 built 1999 NRHP-listed	497 Main St. 41°31′48″N 87°15′12″W	Hobart, Indiana	Italianate architecture
Unitarian Universalist Church, Tippecanoe County		1949 founded 1959 built	333 Meridian St. 40°26′4″N 86°54′33″W	West Lafayette, Indiana	Congregation moved from Temple Israel (Lafayette, Indiana) location it had occupied since 1976 to the former St. Andrews United Methodist Church building in West Lafayette, Indiana October 2007.
Unitarian Universalist Congregation of the Quad Cities		1868	3707 Eastern Ave.	Davenport, Iowa	Founded by freethinking Germans a number of years after Emerson visited. Current Building built in 1959
First Universalist Church of Cedar Rapids		1875 built 1978 NRHP-listed	600 3rd Ave. 41°58′48″N 91°39′44″W	Cedar Rapids, Iowa	Mission/Spanish Revival building served for 135 years, but was demolished in 2011.
First Unitarian Church (Des Moines, Iowa)				Des Moines, Iowa	In 2007, the minister performed the first legal same sex marriage in Iowa (and the first one in the U.S. outside Massachusetts).
Universalist Church (Mitchellville, Iowa)		1878 founded	420 4th St. 41°40′16″N 93°21′41″W	Mitchellville, Iowa	Mid 19th Century Revival architecture. NRHP-listed.
First Universalist Church		1876 built 1979 NRHP-listed	44°5′39″N 70°13′46″W	Auburn, Maine	Gothic Revival architecture
Dexter Universalist Church		1867 built 1985 NRHP-listed	Church St. 45°1′29″N 69°17′22″W	Dexter, Maine	
Unitarian Church of Houlton		1902 built 1987 NRHP-listed	Military St. 46°7′27″N 67°50′15″W	Houlton, Maine	
Universalist Meeting House		1839 built 1988 NRHP-listed	43°56′33″N 70°15′20″W	New Gloucester, Maine	Greek Revival
Pittsfield Universalist Church		1898 built 1983 NRHP-listed	N. Main and Easy Sts. 44°47′3″N 69°22′55″W	Pittsfield, Maine	Queen Anne
First Universalist Society of West Sumner		1867 built 2002 NRHP-listed	1114 Main St. 44°21′58″N 70°27′40″W	Sumner, Maine	Greek Revival, Italianate
Universalist-Unitarian Church		1832 built 1978 NRHP-listed	Silver and Elm Sts. 44°32′48″N 69°38′9″W	Waterville, Maine	Gothic Revival, Federal
First Unitarian Church (Baltimore, Maryland)		1817 founded 1817 built 1972 NRHP-listed	39°17′43″N 76°36′58″W	Baltimore, Maryland	was founded in 1817 and is the oldest church building specifically built for worship by Unitarians, whereas older UU churches were built and initially used for other Christian denominations. The church gained prominence early in the American Unitarian movement when William Ellery Channing preached the "Baltimore Sermon" in 1819 at the ordination of Jared Sparks. The sermon was then the most published Unitarian tract in the United States and articulated for the first time the idea of Unitarian Christianity.
Unitarian Church of Barnstable		1639 founded 1639; 1907 built	41°42′2″N 70°17′56″W	Barnstable, Massachusetts	Current building built after a fire in 1907.
First Parish Church in Bedford		1729 founded 1816 built		Bedford, Massachusetts	
Bernardston Congregational Unitarian Church		1739 built 1993 NRHP-listed	42°40′14″N 72°33′0″W	Bernardston, Massachusetts	Greek Revival
Arlington Street Church		1729 founded		Boston, Massachusetts	(founded 1729 in Boston) was the congregation of William Ellery Channing and Dana McLean Greeley. The congregation played a large role in the origin and foundation of the faith and has been a leader in social justice causes. It is considered by many to be the 'Mother Church' of the faith.
First Church in Boston		1630 founded 1867 built 1968 rebuilt	42°21′13.7″N 71°4′28.3″W	Boston, Massachusetts	It was originally a Congregationalist church as part of original Puritan settlement in Boston.
King's Chapel				Boston, Massachusetts	is one of the oldest New England churches of any denomination (1686), and is on the Freedom Trail. It is one of the oldest surviving congregations in the United States. It was originally Episcopalian but unitarian Christian after the Revolution, in practice today an open but strongly Christian ecumenical church, traditional in its worship and using the latest (1985) revision of its Common Prayer Book.
First Parish Unitarian Universalist		1716 founded 1717 built 1845 rebuilt	50 School St.	Bridgewater, Massachusetts	
Second Unitarian Church		1916 built 1985 NRHP-listed	11 Charles St. 42°21′6″N 71°7′46″W	Brookline, Massachusetts	Colonial Revival, Georgian Revival
First Parish Church of Dorchester		1631 founded 1897 built	42°18′29.4″N 71°3′44.2″W	Dorchester, Massachusetts	This is the oldest worshiping congregation in the city of Boston. It was founded in 1630.
First Parish Church, Unitarian Universalist		1632 founded 1840 built 1978 NRHP-listed	42°2′6″N 70°41′33″W	Duxbury, Massachusetts	in Duxbury, Massachusetts, was founded in 1632 by Pilgrims. The Elder William Brewster (Pilgrim) was the church's first religious leader, and the church included John Alden and Myles Standish as members. It was the second religious body of the Plymouth Colony. Greek Revival building built in 1840.
Unitarian Memorial Church		1901 built 1996 NRHP-listed	41°38′1″N 70°54′9″W	Fairhaven, Massachusetts	Late Gothic Revival. Very grand church donated by Henry Rogers.
The Unitarian Society		1835 built 1982 NRHP-listed	41°42′22″N 71°9′17″W	Fall River, Massachusetts	Its 1835 Gothic Revival building was listed on the National Register in 1982, but was destroyed by fire in 1983.
Foxborough Universalist Church, Unitarian Universalist Association		1838 founded 1843 built		Foxborough, Massachusetts	is the oldest church building in Foxborough. It was founded in 1838 and built in 1843.
First Parish Unitarian Universalist Church		1700 founded		Framingham, Massachusetts	founded in 1700
Follen Church Society		1841 built 1976 NRHP-listed	42°25′47″N 71°12′27″W	Lexington, Massachusetts	was, from 1836 to 1838, the last pulpit of Ralph Waldo Emerson. Its unique octagonal sanctuary was designed by first minister Charles Follen, a noted abolitionist.
First Parish Unitarian Church		1789 built 1974 NRHP-listed	42°11′14″N 71°18′25″W	Medfield, Massachusetts	Greek Revival
Unitarian Universalist Church of Medford and the Osgood House		1690 founded 1894 built 1975 NRHP-listed	42°25′13″N 71°6′55″W	Medford, Massachusetts	Gothic, Georgian architecture, also known as Unitarian Universalist Church and Parsonage
First Religious Society Church and Parish Hall		1801 built 1976 NRHP-listed	26 Pleasant St.42°48′39″N 70°52′18″W	Newburyport, Massachusetts	Church was originally a Reformed congregation, is now Unitarian Universalist. Federal architecture.
First Unitarian Society in Newton		1906 built 1986 NRHP-listed	1326 Washington St.42°20′54″N 71°13′41″W	Newton, Massachusetts	Designed by architect Ralph Adams Cram: Late Gothic Revival, Tudor Revival, Elizabethan Revival, other
North Parish Church		1836 built	190 Academy Road	North Andover, Massachusetts	Unitarian Universalist church; building designed by Richard Bond (architect) and built in 1836 when the congregation changed from Puritan to Unitarian. Fifth meetinghouse of the congregation that was founded in 1645. The building's architecture is called "Cardboard Gothic" architecture.
Universalist Society Meetinghouse		1834 built 1999 NRHP-listed	41°46′59″N 69°58′40″W	Orleans, Massachusetts	Greek Revival
First Unitarian Church		1872 built 1989 NRHP-listed	42°31′28″N 70°55′38″W	Peabody, Massachusetts	Greek Revival, Italianate
First Parish Church in Plymouth		1606 founded		Plymouth, Massachusetts	founded in 1606 by Pilgrims, is possibly the oldest church in continuous operation in the United States
First Universalist Church (Provincetown, Massachusetts)		1829 founded 1847 built 1972 NRHP-listed	42°3′3″N 70°11′17″W	Provincetown, Massachusetts	Greek Revival; Founded in 1829 as The Church of the Redeemer (Universalist). The name was changed to the Universalist Church in 1863, and later to the Universalist Meeting House. Current Meeting House was built in 1847.
United First Parish Church (Unitarian) of Quincy		1828 built 1970 NRHP-listed	42°15′4″N 71°0′11″W	Quincy, Massachusetts	Burial place of U.S. Presidents John Adams and John Quincy Adams and their wives.
Wollaston Unitarian Church		1888 built 1989 NRHP-listed	155 Beale St.42°15′51″N 71°1′19″W	Quincy, Massachusetts	Shingle Style
First Universalist Church		1808 built 1983 NRHP-listed	42°31′26″N 70°53′44″W	Salem, Massachusetts	Federal
First Parish Church		1616 founded		Scituate, Massachusetts	A small log cabin on Meeting House Lane served as the first church. The site is marked today by a monument that lists the early members of the parish, "The Men of Kent," and by gravestones from the 17th century.
First Unitarian Church		1875-1899 built 1989 NRHP-listed	42°23′15.2″N 71°6′5.3″W	Somerville, Massachusetts	
First Universalist Church		1916 built 1989 NRHP-listed	125 Highland; 42°23′15″N 71°6′5″W	Somerville, Massachusetts	Romanesque, designed by Ralph Adams Cram
First Unitarian Church		1869 built 1984 NRHP-listed	42°28′52″N 71°5′55″W	Stoneham, Massachusetts	Stick/Eastlake, Gothic Revival
First Parish of Sudbury		1797 built	42°22′58″N 71°24′45″W	Sudbury, Massachusetts	First Parish in Sudbury, MA was erected in 1797. Part of the Sudbury Center Historic District.
The First Parish		1814 built		Wayland, Massachusetts	The First Parish in Wayland, Massachusetts, was erected in 1814, although the congregation first gathered in 1640. The original church bell, still hanging in the recently renovated bell tower, was cast by the foundry of Paul Revere and Son.
Unitarian Universalist Church of Weymouth				Weymouth, Massachusetts	Unitarian Universalist Church of Weymouth Successor to three Weymouth congregations, the oldest founded in 1836. Built in 1873. Provided the first pulpit for Olympia Brown, the first American ordained woman minister.
South Unitarian Church		1894 built 1980 NRHP-listed	888 Main St.42°15′11″N 71°49′5″W	Worcester, Massachusetts	Romanesque
First Unitarian Church (Second Parish in the Town of Worcester)		1785 founded		Worcester, Massachusetts	founded in 1785 in Worcester, Massachusetts. The first minister was Aaron Bancroft the first president of the American Unitarian Association. In 2023, the membership is 275.
Unitarian Universalist Church (Ann Arbor, Michigan)		1881 built 1978 NRHP-listed	100 N. State St.42°16′53″N 83°44′26″W	Ann Arbor, Michigan	Queen Anne, Richardsonian Romanesque
First Unitarian Universalist Church of Detroit		1830s founded 1916 built	4605 Cass Ave.42°21′11.84″N 83°3′55.67″W	Detroit, Michigan	Neo-Gothic, Donaldson & Meier-designed. Perry McAdow House (church house) built 1892, NRHP list 1980.
First Unitarian Church of Detroit		1889 built 1982 NRHP-listed	42°20′37.6″N 83°3′18.91″W	Detroit, Michigan	Romanesque, Donaldson & Meier-designed. Destroyed by fire May 10, 2014.
Unity Church-Unitarian	Unity Church exterior and main entrance. Stone building with bell tower	Articles of association launching Unity Church of St. Paul established: February 25, 1872 Current building: 1905	733 Portland Avenue, St. Paul, MN 55104	St. Paul, Minnesota	Norman Romanesque style built of local yellow limestone with trimming of Bedford stone. Sanctuary features a Noack Tracker organ, the first of its scope and style in the Upper Midwest.
Unitarian Church of the Messiah		1880 built 1980 NRHP-listed; 1987 demolished 1994 delisted	Locust and Garrison Sts.38°38′9″N 90°13′17″W	St. Louis, Missouri	Peabody & Stearns-designed, Late Victorian. Demolished after damaged in a fire.
Gaia Community		1998 founded		Kansas City, Missouri	is the oldest active Pagan-themed UU congregation. Chartered on May 1, 1998, Gaia Community is not associated with CUUPS.
First Unitarian Church of St. Louis		1835 founded		St. Louis, Missouri	was founded in 1835 and is the first Unitarian church west of the Mississippi. William Greenleaf Eliot, the first minister of the church, along with members of his congregation, founded Washington University in St. Louis in 1853, and was its first President.
First Unitarian Church of Omaha		1917 built 1980 NRHP-listed	41°15′25″N 95°57′28″W	Omaha, Nebraska	Colonial Revival
People's Unitarian Church		1901 built 1984 NRHP-listed	1640 N St.41°36′5″N 98°55′48″W	Ord, Nebraska	
Unitarian Church (Hampton Falls, New Hampshire)		1838 built 1984 NRHP-listed	42°56′0″N 70°53′23″W	Hampton Falls, New Hampshire	
Keene Unitarian Universalist Church		1894 built 2024 NRHP-listed	69 Washington St.42°56′10″N 72°16′38″W	Keene, New Hampshire	Gothic Revival & Tudor Revival; architect Edwin J. Lewis Jr.
Peterborough Unitarian Church		1825 built 1973 NRHP-listed	Main and Summer Sts.42°52′40″N 71°57′0″W	Peterborough, New Hampshire	Federal
South Parish (Portsmouth, New Hampshire)		1826 built 1979 NRHP-listed	State St. 43°4′32″N 70°45′29″W	Portsmouth, New Hampshire	Early Republic
First Universalist Church		1879 built 1979 NRHP-listed	Main St. 42°56′0″N 71°3′15″W	Kingston, New Hampshire	Stick/Eastlake
First Universalist Chapel (Lempster, New Hampshire)		1845 built 2006 NRHP-listed	3 2nd New Hampshire Turnpike; 43°13′39″N 72°10′43″W	Lempster, New Hampshire	
First Unitarian Universalist Fellowship of Hunterdon County		1837 built 1986 founded 2018 NRHP-listed	Oak Summit Road; 40°32′34″N 75°00′20″W	Kingwood Township, New Jersey	Historically known as the Old Stone Presbyterian Church in Kingwood
Beacon Unitarian Universalist Congregation in Summit		1908 founded 1913 built	40°43′7″N 74°21′15″W	Summit, New Jersey	
First Unitarian Univeralist Society Albany		1842 founded 1925 built	405 Washington Avenue	Albany, New York	
Unitarian Universalist Church of Buffalo		1831 founded 1906 built 2015 NRHP-listed	695 Elmwood Ave. 42.916185°N 78.877050°W	Buffalo, New York	
Unitarian Universalist Church (Cortland, New York)		1837 built 1993 NRHP-listed	3 Church St.42°36′5″N 76°10′41″W	Cortland, New York	Greek Revival, Federal architecture, implemented with Cobblestone architecture
Dexter Universalist Church		1841 built 2003 NRHP-listed	Brown and Kirby Sts. 44°0′29″N 76°2′41″W	Dexter, New York	Greek Revival
First Unitarian Society of Ithaca		1865 founded; 1893 built	306 North Aurora Street	Ithaca, New York	Style: Romanesque Revival; Architect: William Henry Miller
Christ Church (Middletown, New York)		1901 built 2008 NRHP-listed	6 Orchard St. 41°26′45.45″N 74°25′3.9″W	Middletown, Orange County, New York	Late Gothic Revival
First Unitarian Congregational Society in Brooklyn		1833 founded built	Pierrepont Street and Monroe Place, Brooklyn Heights; 40.69529°N 73.99282°W	Brooklyn, New York City	
Unitarian Universalist Congregation at Shelter Rock		1941 founded	48 Shelter Rock Road	Manhasset, New York	Originally found as The North Shore Unitarian Society. A spiritual home that nourishes both the heart and mind. It is a mix of engaging worship, religious education, opportunities for social action, and a community of caring, curious and compassionate people.
Unitarian Church of All Souls		1819 founded	1157 Lexington Avenue (at East 80th Street); 40.7755°N 73.9584°W	Manhattan, New York City	Founded in 1819 following an inspiring sermon by William Ellery Channing during a visit there, All Souls is one of the largest and most influential churches in the denomination. Herman Melville and Peter Cooper were members of All Souls, and minister Henry Whitney Bellows led the congregation for 43 years. Forrest Church, author and theologian, served as senior Minister for almost 30 years and was Minister of Public Theology until his death on September 24, 2009.
Fourth Universalist Society in the City of New York		Founded: 1838; Current Building Constructed: 1898	160 Central Park West (at W. 76th St.); 40°46′43.4″N 73°58′28.5″W	Manhattan, New York City	Dubbed the "Cathedral of Universalism," the Fourth Universalist Society in the City of New York was founded in 1838. Through the years, the congregation has attracted such notables as P. T. Barnum, Horace Greeley, Louise Whitfield Carnegie, and Lou Gehrig to its pews. In 1898, the congregation constructed its current building across from Central Park on the Upper West Side of Manhattan. Designed by William Appleton Potter, the church contains significant works by Louis Comfort Tiffany, Augustus Saint-Gaudens, Clayton and Bell and the Ernest M. Skinner & Company.
Unitarian Universalist Fellowship of Northern Westchester		Founded 1957, Current building constructed 1970	236 S Bedford Rd	Mount Kisco, New York	Brutalist style, built in 1970 by modernist architect Victor Christ-Janer
First Unitarian Universalist Church of Niagara		founded 1922 built	639 Main St. 43°5′44″N 79°3′24″W	Niagara Falls, New York	
First Universalist Church of Portageville		1841 built 2008 NRHP-listed	E. Koy Rd. at NY 19A; 42°34′4″N 78°2′43″W	Portageville, New York	Greek Revival with Gothic and Federal elements
First Universalist Church (Rochester, New York)		1908 built 1971 NRHP-listed	43°9′14″N 77°36′17″W	Rochester, New York	Romanesque Revival style, designed by Claude Fayette Bragdon
First Unitarian Church of Rochester		1962 built 2008 NRHP-listed	220 Winton Road South; 43°8′28″N 77°33′26″W	Rochester, New York	Susan B. Anthony, national leader of the women's suffrage movement, was a long-time member. The building was designed by Louis Kahn.
The Boone Unitarian Universalist Fellowship		Founded 1958	381 E. King St.	Boone, North Carolina	Liberal religion in the High Country for over 50 years
The Unitarian Universalist Church of Charlotte		1947 founded 1965 built	234 North Sharon Amity Road; 35.176024°N 80.795539°W	Charlotte, North Carolina	
Eno River Unitarian Universalist Fellowship				Durham, North Carolina	
St John's Unitarian Universalist Church		1814 founded 1868 Washington Park location 1960 Clifton location	320 Resor Ave; Cincinnati, OH 45220-1698; 39.148332°N 84.519944°W	Cincinnati, Ohio	St John's is one of the oldest congregations west of the Appalachians. The congregation occupied several locations before moving to historic Washington Park building (now The Transept). The Congregation relocated to current Clifton location in 1960. Architectural lines in the floor of the current building track the sun at the winter solstices and the equinoxes; at summer solstice, the sun shines along the interior ceiling. The facade is said to be slightly curved which if extended would be create a circle centered in the heart of Cincinnati. Sound quality for musical performances is said to be extraordinary.
All Souls Unitarian-Universalist Church		1822 founded 1897 built 1976 NRHP-listed		Bellville, Ohio	Richardsonian Romanesque
First Universalist Church (Cincinnati, Ohio)		1980 NRHP-listed	39°7′40.19″N 84°29′53.55″W	Cincinnati, Ohio	Designed by Samuel Hannaford & Sons in Romanesque style
First Congregational-Unitarian Church		1830 founded 1889 built 1976 NRHP-listed	2901 Reading Rd.39°7′55″N 84°29′53″W	Cincinnati, Ohio	Richardsonian Romanesque
Unitarian Universalist Church of Kent Ohio				Kent, Ohio	
First Universalist Church of Lyons, Ohio		1852 gathered 1868 built	145 East Morenci Street41°41′58″N 84°04′12″W	Lyons, Ohio	Victorian
First Unitarian Church of Marietta		1855 built 1973 NRHP-listed	232 3rd St.39°24′58″N 81°27′11″W	Marietta, Ohio	Gothic Revival
Universalist Church (Montgomery, Ohio)		1970 CP NRHP-listed		Montgomery, Ohio	Contributing property in NRHP-listed Universalist Church Historic District
First Universalist Church of Olmsted		1847 built 1980 NRHP-listed	5050 Porter Rd. 41°24′58″N 81°55′45″W	North Olmsted, Ohio	Greek Revival
West Shore Unitarian Universalist Church		1946 founded Built 1952	20401 Hilliard Blvd	Rocky River, Ohio	Largest Unitarian Universalist Church in Northeast Ohio
Springboro Universalist Church or "Old Stone Church"		1905 built 1999 NRHP-listed as part of Springboro Historic District	300 South Main Street; 39°33′11″N 84°13′59″W	Springboro, Ohio	Late Gothic Revival. Springboro's Universalist Church built the "Old Stone Church" in 1905, the congregation disbanded in the 1950s. Church presently used by South Dayton Church of Christ.
Universalist Church of Westfield Center		1849 built 1978 NRHP-listed	LeRoy and Greenwich Rds. 41°1′39″N 81°55′59″W	Westfield Center, Ohio	Greek Revival, Stick/Eastlake
All Souls Unitarian Church		1921 founded 1955 built	36.121181°N 95.976332°W	Tulsa, Oklahoma	is the largest one-church UU congregation.
First Unitarian Church of Portland		1924 built 1978 NRHP-listed	1011 SW 12th Ave45°31′6.3″N 122°41′8.4″W	Portland, Oregon	Colonial Revival, Georgian Revival
Unitarian Universalist Church of Lancaster, Pennsylvania		1902 founded 1908-1909 built	538 West Chestnut Street.40.039953°N 76.316560°W	Lancaster, Pennsylvania	transitional Gothic Revival by C. Emlen Urban; Franz Xaver Zettler stained glass with unique pacifist themes; Charles Connick stained glass
Unitarian Universalist Church of Meadville, Pennsylvania	UU Church of Meadville	1825 Founded as Independent Congregational Church. Church built 1835-36. The building was added to the National Register of Historic Places in 1978.	346 Chestnut Street. 41°38'14.4"N 80°08'59.8"W	Meadville, Pennsylvania	The congregation was established by Harm Jan Huidekoper, a prominent early Unitarian who also founded the Meadville Theological School in Meadville with his son Frederic. The theological school merged with Lombard College, a Universalist seminary, in the 1930s to create the Meadville Lombard Theological School at the University of Chicago. The congregation's first 75 years were chronicled by Earl Morse Wilbur, who was minister of the church from 1899 to 1904.
First Unitarian Church of Philadelphia		1796 founded 1886 built 1971 NRHP-listed	2125 Chestnut St.39°57′8.67″N 75°10′36.8″W	Philadelphia, Pennsylvania	Church was established by Joseph Priestley on June 12, 1796, and is currently the first continuously functioning church in the United States to proclaim itself "Unitarian". Frank Furness-designed Gothic building.
The Unitarian Universalist Church of the Restoration in Mt. Airy		Founded 1820, current building 1938–present	6900 Stenton Ave.	Philadelphia, Pennsylvania	Frank A. Stewart designed cruciform sanctuary, Pennsylvania bluestone
Channing Memorial Church		Founded 1836, current building 2009	135 Pelham St.	Newport, Rhode Island	Designed by Elbridge Boyden and Sons in a Romantic Gothic Revival style
First Universalist Church		1872 built 1977 NRHP-listed	41°49′15″N 71°25′4″W	Providence, Rhode Island	Gothic
First Unitarian Church of Providence		1720 founded 1816 built	41°49′27.6″N 71°24′18.3″W	Providence, Rhode Island	
Unitarian Church in Charleston		1772 founded 1787 built 1973 NRHP-listed	4 Archdale St.32°46′20″N 79°56′2″W	Charleston, South Carolina	Gothic Revival architecture; a U.S. National Historic Landmark. Church, established in 1772, is "the oldest Unitarian church in the South".
Greenville Unitarian Universalist Fellowship		1950 founded, 1995 moved, 2014 renovated	1135 State Park Rd.34.909285°N 82.388749°W	Greenville, South Carolina	Modern
Liberty Universalist Church and Feasterville Academy Historic District		1832 built 1984 NRHP-listed	34°30′13″N 81°21′36″W	Near Winnsboro, South Carolina	
Tennessee Valley Unitarian Universalist Church		1949 founded 1997 built		Knoxville, Tennessee	Site of the 2008 Knoxville Unitarian Universalist church shooting
First Unitarian Church of Memphis, the Church of the River		1898 founded built 1965	292 Virginia Avenue, West a/k/a Burton Dean Carley Drive	Memphis, Tennessee	Award-winning architecture by Roy Harrover for church building built in 1965
First Unitarian Universalist Church of Austin			4700 Grover Avenue Austin, TX 78756	Austin, Texas	rest in peace scott
Cavendish Universalist Church		1844 built 1973 NRHP-listed	VT 131; 43°23′5″N 72°36′22″W	Cavendish, Vermont	Greek Revival, Vernacular Greek Revival
Champlain Valley Unitarian Universalist Society				Middlebury, Vermont	
Unitarian Universalist Church of Arlington		1948 founded 1964 built	4444 Arlington Boulevard; 38°52′6.07″N 77°6′26.95″W	Arlington County, Virginia	Brutalist style sanctuary listed on the National Register of Historic Places in 2014.
Edmonds Unitarian Universalist Church		1957 founded	47°47′49″N 122°20′34″W	Edmonds, Washington	
Unitarian Universalist Church of Spokane		Founded 1887; Building Constructed 1994	4340 West Whistalks Way	Spokane, Washington	
All Souls Church, Unitarian (Washington, D.C.)		1821 founded	Harvard Street	Washington, D.C.	on Harvard Street in DC, was founded in 1821 by (among others) John Quincy Adams, and has spawned many Unitarian congregations in the Joseph Priestley District.
Universalist National Memorial Church		1925 founded 1930 built	1810 16th Street, NW; 38.914289°N 77.036712°W	Washington, D.C.	
Free Congregation of Sauk County		1852 founded 1884 built 1988 NRHP-listed	309 Polk St. 43°16′34″N 89°43′28″W	Sauk City, Wisconsin	Oldest Freethought-oriented congregation in the United States, located in Sauk City, Wisconsin, since 1852. Its current building, known as Freethinkers' Hall or as Park Hall, was built in 1884.
First Unitarian Society of Madison		1949-1951 built 1973 NRHP-listed; 2004 NHL	43°4′33.2″N 89°26′6.65″W	Shorewood Hills, Wisconsin	This is one of the largest congregations; its Modern Movement building was designed by Frank Lloyd Wright. Located in Shorewood Hills, a suburb of Madison, Wisconsin
First Unitarian Church		1891 built 1974 NRHP-listed	1009 E. Ogden Ave.	Milwaukee, Wisconsin	Ferry & Clas-designed Gothic Revival building
United Unitarian and Universalist Church		1878 built 1987 NRHP-listed	216 Main St.42°51′43″N 88°19′55″W	Mukwonago, Wisconsin	Gothic
Stoughton Universalist Church		1858 built 1982 NRHP-listed	324 S. Page St. 42°54′58″N 89°13′25″W	Stoughton, Wisconsin	
First Universalist Church		1898 built 1980 NRHP-listed	504 Grant St. 44°57′45″N 89°37′29″W	Wausau, Wisconsin	Medieval English Revival style building designed by Alexander C. Eschweiler
West Shore Unitarian Universalist Church		1946 founded 1952	20401 Hilliard Blv.	Rocky River, Ohio	

== Worldwide ==
- Church of the Larger Fellowship (CLF) is a worldwide congregation.
- International Council of Unitarians and Universalists (ICUU) was an umbrella organization (1995-2001) that brought together many Unitarian, Universalist, and Unitarian Universalist churches and denominational organizations.

== See also ==
- List of Unitarians, Universalists, and Unitarian Universalists
