= Unitarian-Universalist Church =

Unitarian-Universalist Church, or Universalist-Unitarian Church, with or without the hyphen, may refer to the religion of Unitarian Universalism.

It may also refer to a local congregation, or a local congregation's church building, of this religion, including:

Unitarian-Universalist or Unitarian Universalist:

USA

- Unitarian-Universalist Church (Stamford, Connecticut)
- Follen Church Society-Unitarian Universalist, Lexington, Massachusetts
- Unitarian Universalist Church of Medford and the Osgood House, Medford, Massachusetts
- Unitarian Universalist Church (Cortland, New York)
- First Unitarian Universalist Church of Niagara, Niagara Falls, New York
- The Unitarian Universalist Church of Charlotte, North Carolina
- All Souls Unitarian-Universalist Church, Bellville, Ohio
- Unitarian Church in Charleston, South Carolina
- Edmonds Unitarian Universalist Church, Edmonds, Washington

Universalist-Unitarian or Universalist Unitarian:

USA

- Universalist-Unitarian Church, Waterville, Maine
- Universalist Unitarian Church of Joliet, Illinois
- Universalist Unitarian Church of Riverside, California

== See also ==
- List of Unitarian, Universalist, and Unitarian Universalist churches
