= All Souls Church =

All Souls Church, All Soul's Chapel, and variations, may refer to:

== United Kingdom ==
- Church of All Souls, Bolton
- All Souls' Church, Halifax
- All Souls Church, Hastings
- All Souls' Church, Blackman Lane
- All Souls Church, Langham Place
- Church of All Souls, Manchester (demolished)
- All Souls Chapel (Cardiff) (demolished)

== United States ==
- All Souls Church (Scott, Arkansas), listed on the NRHP in Arkansas
- All Souls Universalist Church (Riverside, California), as listed on the National Register of Historic Places
- All Souls Catholic Church (Sanford, Florida), a parish in the Roman Catholic Diocese of Orlando
- All Souls Church (Augusta, Maine)
- All Souls Congregational Church (Bangor, Maine), listed on the NRHP in Maine
- All Souls Chapel (Poland Spring, Maine), listed on the NRHP
- All Souls Church (Braintree, Massachusetts)
- All Souls Church (Plainfield, New Jersey), listed on the NRHP in New Jersey
- Unitarian Church of All Souls, New York City, New York
- All Souls Church (Tannersville, New York), listed on the NRHP in New York
- All Souls Episcopal Church and Parish House (Asheville, North Carolina), listed on the NRHP in North Carolina
- All Souls Unitarian-Universalist Church, listed on the NRHP in Ohio
- All Souls Unitarian Church, Tulsa, Oklahoma
- All Souls Church, Unitarian (Washington, D.C.)
- All Souls' Episcopal Church, Belle Isle neighborhood of Miami Beach, Florida

== Elsewhere ==
- All Souls' Chapel (Prince Edward Island), a National Historic Site of Canada
- All Souls' Church, Cameron Highlands, Pahang, Malaysia
