= First Universalist Church =

First Universalist Church or First Universalist Chapel may refer to:

== United States ==
(by state then city)

- First Universalist Church (Atlanta, Georgia)
- First Universalist Church (Elgin, Illinois), listed on the National Register of Historic Places (NRHP) in Kane County
- First Universalist Church (Auburn, Maine), NRHP-listed in Androscoggin County
- First Universalist Church (Provincetown, Massachusetts), NRHP-listed in Barnstable County
- First Universalist Church (Salem, Massachusetts), NRHP-listed in Essex County
- First Universalist Church (Somerville, Massachusetts), NRHP-listed in Middlesex County
- First Universalist Church (Kingston, New Hampshire), NRHP-listed in Rockingham County
- First Universalist Chapel (Lempster, New Hampshire), NRHP-listed in Sullivan County
- First Universalist Church (Rochester, New York), NRHP-listed in Monroe County
- First Universalist Church (Cincinnati, Ohio), NRHP-listed in Hamilton County
- First Universalist Church (Providence, Rhode Island), NRHP-listed in Providence County
- First Universalist Church (Wausau, Wisconsin), NRHP-listed in Marathon County
