= First Church of Christ, Scientist (Cedar Rapids, Iowa) =

- U.S. National Register of Historic Places
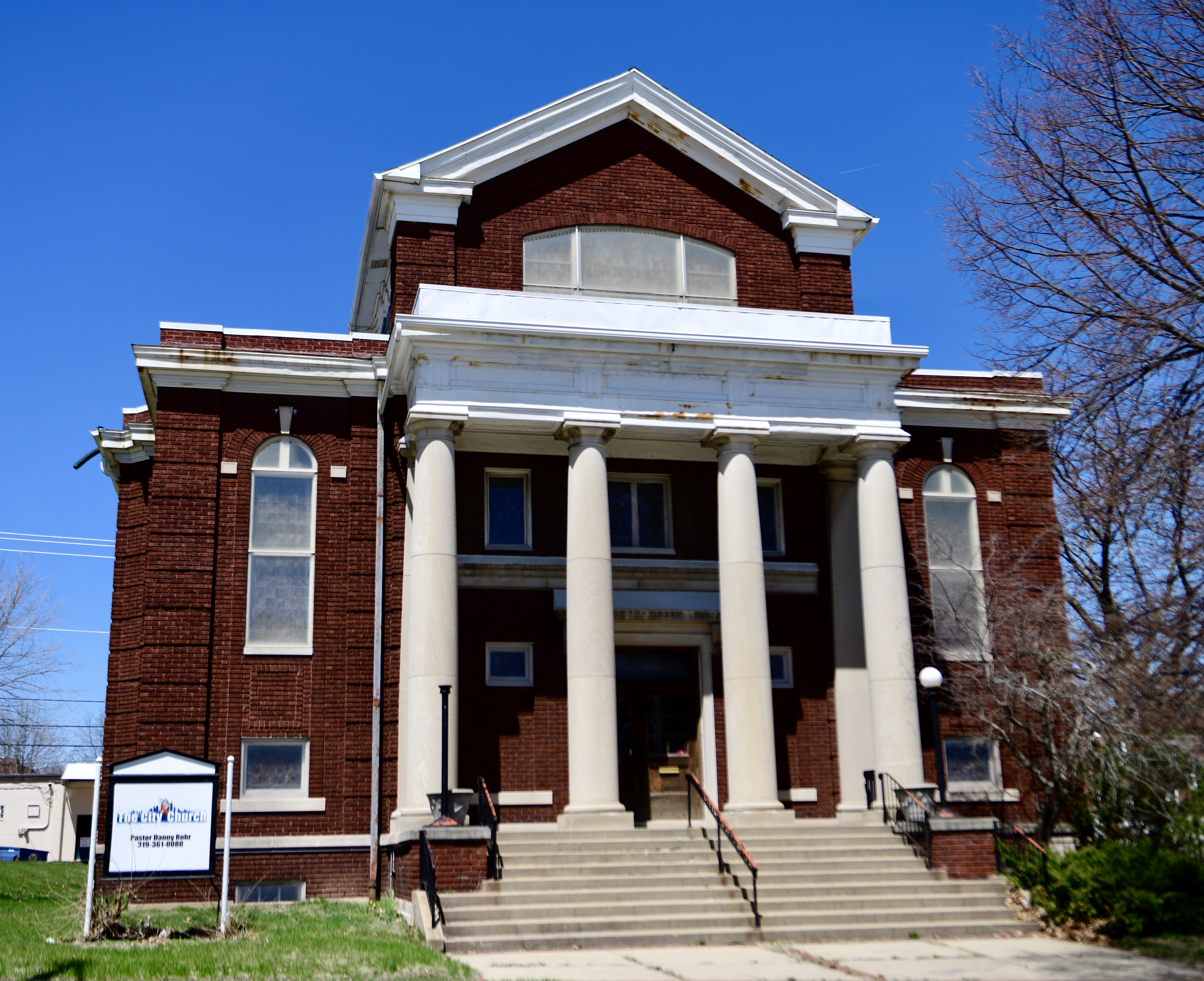

- Location within Iowa Location within the United States
- Location: 1246 2nd Ave. SE. Cedar Rapids, Iowa
- Coordinates: 41°59′06.2″N 91°39′21.2″W
- Built: 1915
- Architectural style: Classical Revival
- MPS: Religious Properties of Cedar Rapids, MPS
- NRHP reference No.: 100001698
- Added to NRHP: October 10, 2017

The former First Church of Christ, Scientist, also known as The City Church, is located in Cedar Rapids, Iowa, United States. Christian Science began in Boston in 1866 and it was introduced to Cedar Rapids twenty years later. A Sunday School was established in 1887 and it met at the old Dows Auditorium at Third Avenue and Third Street SE. The congregation was established in 1891 as an official branch of The First Church of Christ, Scientist in Boston. It was the first Christian Science congregation established in Iowa. They held their Wednesday evening services at the Peoples Unitarian Universalist Church. The congregation began construction on this building in 1914 and it was dedicated on Easter Sunday the following year. It is a red brick structure in the Neoclassical style. The rectangular building features a portico with four columns in the Doric order on the main facade, and a centered raised gable roof with cornice returns. The architectural style was chosen to "attract non-churchgoing people that may be intimidated by traditional religious structures." This building was listed on the National Register of Historic Places in 2017. The congregation subsequently moved to a new facility built in 2002 at 640 Blairs Ferry Road, NE. The Blairs Ferry Road property was put up for sale in September 2026.
