= Holy Souls (disambiguation) =

All Souls' Day is a day of prayer and remembrance for the faithful departed, observed by certain Christian denominations on 2 November.

Holy Souls or Holy Soul may also refer to:

- All Souls (disambiguation), in particular
  - Church penitent, souls in Purgatory
  - Society of the Helpers of the Holy Souls
  - Church of the Holy Souls in Purgatory (Alcamo)

== See also ==
- Our Lady of Ransom and the Holy Souls Church, Llandrindod Wells
