= All Soul =

All Soul may refer to:

- All Soul (Johnny "Hammond" Smith album)
- All Soul (Houston Person album)

== See also ==
- All Souls (disambiguation)
