= Allerseelen =

Allerseelen (German for "All Souls' Day") may refer to:

- Allerseelen (band)
- "Allerseelen " (Strauss), an 1885 art song
- All Souls (film), 1919

== See also ==
- All Souls (disambiguation)
