= Universalist Unitarian Church of Joliet =

Church building in illinois, US

Coordinates: 41°31′20.5″N 88°10′14.0″W

The Universalist Church of Joliet (UUCJ) is a Unitarian Universalist church, and is home to one of the oldest congregations in Joliet, Illinois.

The congregation originally incorporated as the First Universalist Society of Juliet in 1844; however, Universalists had been meeting in Juliet, as Joliet was then called, as early as 1836. The congregation first built a small, wooden frame meeting house at the corner of Chicago and Clinton Streets. In 1855 the congregation sold the building, which was moved to another location, and built a gothic-style stone church, named St. John's Universalist Church. In 1892 the historic Auditorium Block, uniquely designed for a combination of religious, economic, and civic uses, replaced the perfectly serviceable stone church. Following the merger of the Unitarian and Universalist denominations, the church was renamed the Universalist Unitarian Church of Joliet, emphasizing the congregation's Universalist roots. The congregation later sold the Auditorium Block; and the church is now located at 3401 W. Jefferson St, the corner of Jefferson and Houbolt streets.

== See also ==
- Unitarian Universalist Association
- List of Unitarian churches
