= Universalist Church of West Hartford =

Congregation in West Hartford, Connecticut, US

Coordinates: 41.769°N 72.7404°W

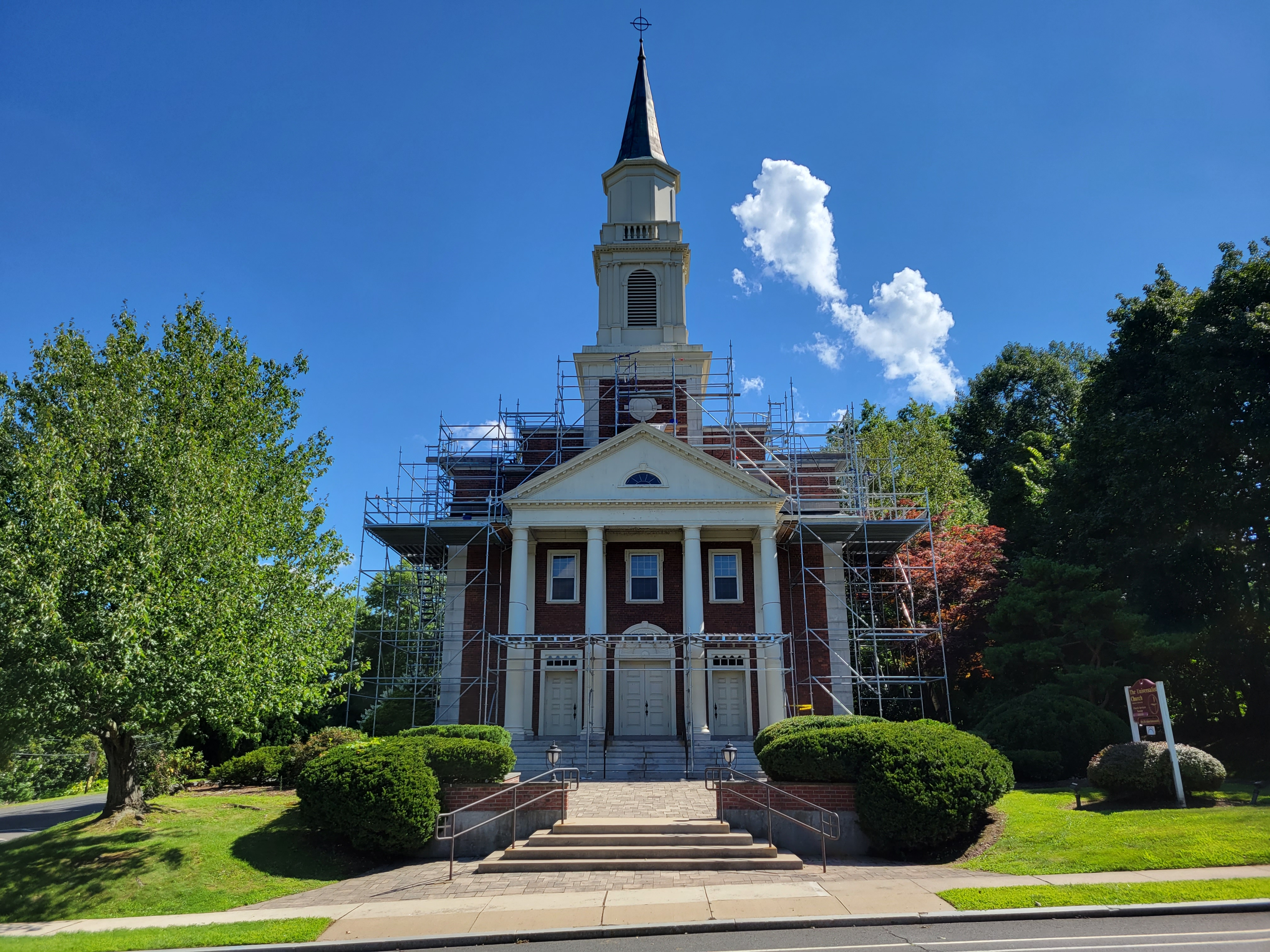
Universalist Church of West Hartford

The Universalist Church of West Hartford is a Unitarian Universalist congregation in West Hartford, Connecticut.

== History ==
The church organized in 1821, but it had its origins in Hartford in the late 18th century, during the period when the Congregational church was dominant in the area. At that time, a sizable group of people, influenced by Elhanan Winchester, began to reject Calvinist doctrine and espouse a belief in the universal goodness of God. In 1821, after a visit to Hartford by Hosea Ballou of Boston, the "First Independent Universalist Society of the City of Hartford" was formed and called its first minister. The name was changed in 1870 to "Church of the Redeemer"—to give the church "a specific title or name", and in the early 1960s was changed to "The Universalist Church of West Hartford".

The first meetinghouse, located in downtown Hartford across the street from the Old State House, was completed and dedicated in 1824. It was used until 1860. In 1860 the church moved to a larger building on Main Street at the site where the Travelers Tower now stands. In 1906, the church moved out of downtown, to a building on Asylum Hill. Each of the first three churches was located on prime real estate in the city of Hartford, so the sale of the property each time largely financed the building of the next church. The present building was dedicated in 1931, and a sizable addition completed in 1962. It is in a strictly residential neighborhood in West Hartford, but serves a much larger community, both urban and suburban. The present building in West Hartford dates from 1931, with the addition of Fiske Hall, some church school rooms and a new sanctuary organ in 1962. The church maintains membership in the Unitarian Universalist Association (UUA), organized in 1961 by the merger of the American Unitarian Association and the Universalist Church of America.

In the early years of the church, ministers’ tenures in general were only a few years. However, since the 1860s there have been long series of ministries, averaging fifteen years. Most notable is the 25-year ministry of former Minister Emeritus, The Reverend Wallace Grant Fiske, followed by fifteen years with The Reverend Frederick Lipp and twelve years with The Reverend Stephen Kendrick. In 2001, The Reverend Dr. Judith Walker-Riggs joined the church as Interim Minister. On November 17, 2002, Jan Katrina Nielsen was installed as the 22nd Senior Minister in the history of this church.

== Building ==
The present church building edifice is a colonial-style, tall-steepled building, erected in 1931 and designed by Walter Crabtree. A large addition was constructed in 1962 includes additional church school rooms, music room, Fiske Hall, a large multi-purpose parish hall with a stage and main kitchen. Between the sanctuary and the addition is the most-used areas, containing newly expanded office space, conference room, library, program center with kitchen and a formal parlor. The church is one of the many in West Hartford to have a youth group, a place for teens to meet and reflect on the spirituality together. The sanctuary seats up to 350 in double rows of pews flanking a center aisle. The memorial stained glass windows which grace the chancel area were designed originally for the former church building. These and other memorial windows were saved and incorporated into this building. An Austin pipe organ was installed in 1963. On the west side of the building is a memorial garden dedicated in 1985. A large parking lot, which is leased from the Town of West Hartford, borders the south side of the property. The church also has a ten-room brick colonial parsonage on Middlefield Drive which it acquired in 1942. On December 5, 1999, the entire church was renovated with a total expenditure of $1.5 million (~$2.65 million in 2024). The extensive renovations touched nearly every inch of the building, including the refurbishing of the sanctuary and addition of a three-floor two-door elevator.

== See also ==
- List of Unitarian, Universalist, and Unitarian Universalist churches
