= Stoughton Universalist Church =

Historic church in Wisconsin, United States

- U.S. National Register of Historic Places
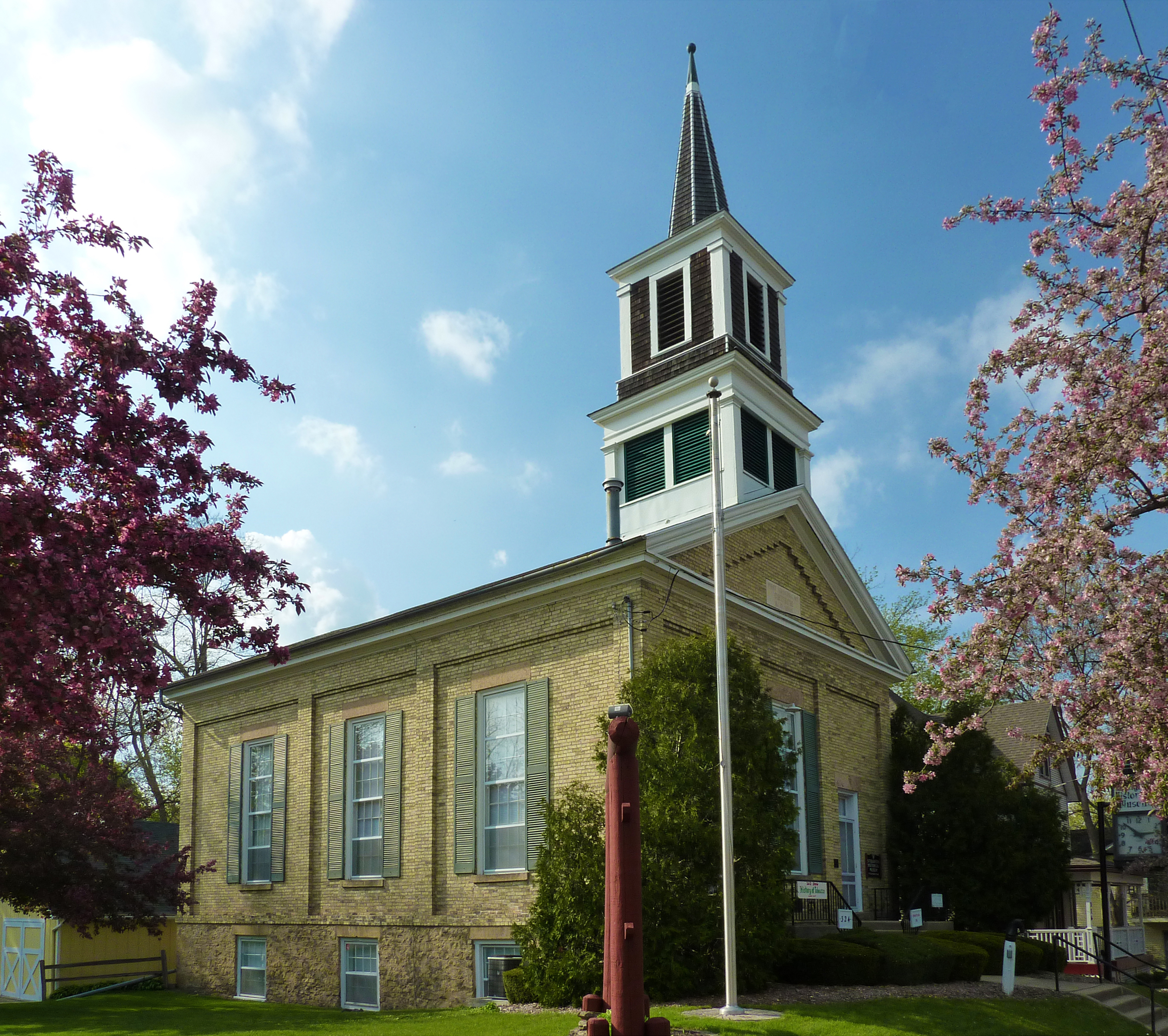

- Location within Wisconsin Location within the United States
- Location: 324 S. Page St. Stoughton, Wisconsin
- Coordinates: 42°54′58″N 89°13′25″W
- Area: less than one acre
- Built: 1858 or 1938
- Built by: Hynes, P.J.
- Architect: S. V. Shipman
- Architectural style: Greek Revival
- NRHP reference No.: 82000659
- Added to NRHP: September 30, 1982

The Stoughton Universalist Church is a Greek Revival-styled church built in Stoughton, Wisconsin in 1858. It was added to the National Register of Historic Places in 1982.

The community of Stoughton was founded in 1847 when Vermont-born Luke Stoughton built a dam on the Yahara River to power his sawmill and gristmill. A settlement grew around that enterprise and in 1858 the first Christian congregation formed - a congregation of the Universalist Church in America. Luke and his family were among the 35 charter members, and he donated a lot for the church building.

Architect Stephen Vaughan Shipman designed a Greek Revival-styled church building - a typical style for that early date. P.J. Hynes supervised the construction, which was done by E.E. Warren, John H. Warren, and finish masonry by J.H. Harvey. The thrifty congregation expected each male member to donate one work-day per week. The building's footprint is a 51 x 31 foot rectangle. The walls are built of cream brick hauled from Milwaukee by oxen. Brick pilasters divide the walls into panels which frame tall windows. The gable ends are framed into pediments. The roof has a moderate pitch typical for Greek Revival. Centered on the front roof peak is a large white square steeple, with two tower stages and then a spire at the top. Inside, the decorations were simple, fitting the Universalist approach to worship.

Shipman went on to design the rotunda and dome of the capitol in Madison.

The church building was shared with the community. Other denominations held services there. Public meetings were held in the basement. The local schools used the building.

The Universalist congregation itself was progressive, calling a woman pastor already in 1869. Another woman ministered around 1883 and another from 1890 to 1892. But the congregation eventually dwindled and stopped using the church in 1938.

In 1960 the Stoughton Historical Society took ownership. They have adapted the interior as a museum while preserving the exterior much as it was.
