= First Universalist Church of Portageville =

Historic church in New York, United States

- U.S. National Register of Historic Places
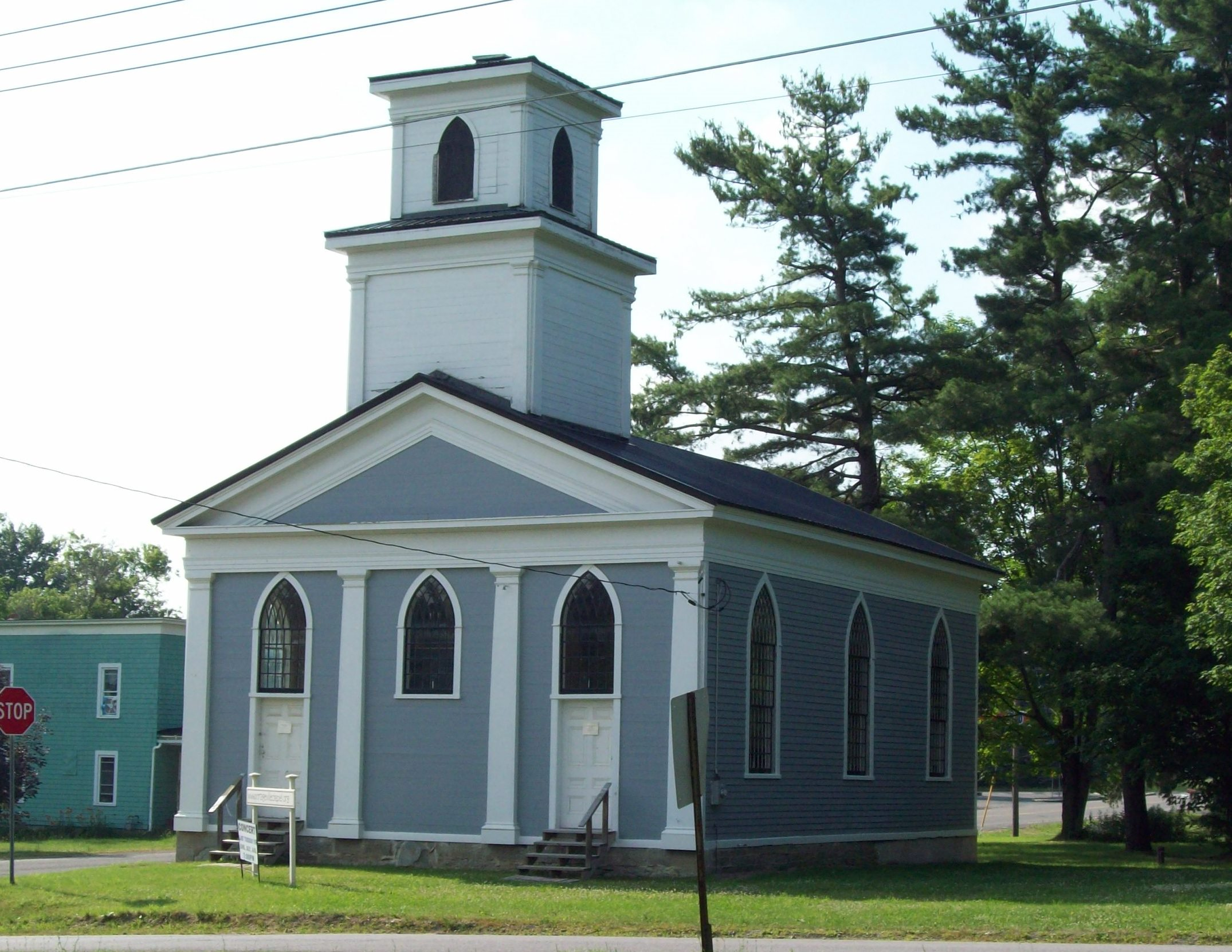
- First Universalist Church of Portageville, July 2011

- Location within New York Location within the United States
- Location: E. Koy Rd. at NY 19A, Portageville, New York
- Coordinates: 42°34′4″N 78°2′43″W
- Built: 1841
- Architectural style: Greek Revival
- NRHP reference No.: 08000040
- Added to NRHP: February 19, 2008

First Universalist Church of Portageville, also known as The Portageville Chapel, is a historic Universalist church in Portageville, Wyoming County, New York. It is a Greek Revival style structure with Gothic and Federal elements dating to 1841. The church features a two-stage square tower above the north gable of the building.

It was listed on the National Register of Historic Places in 2008.
