= South Parish =

Historic church in New Hampshire, United States

- U.S. National Register of Historic Places
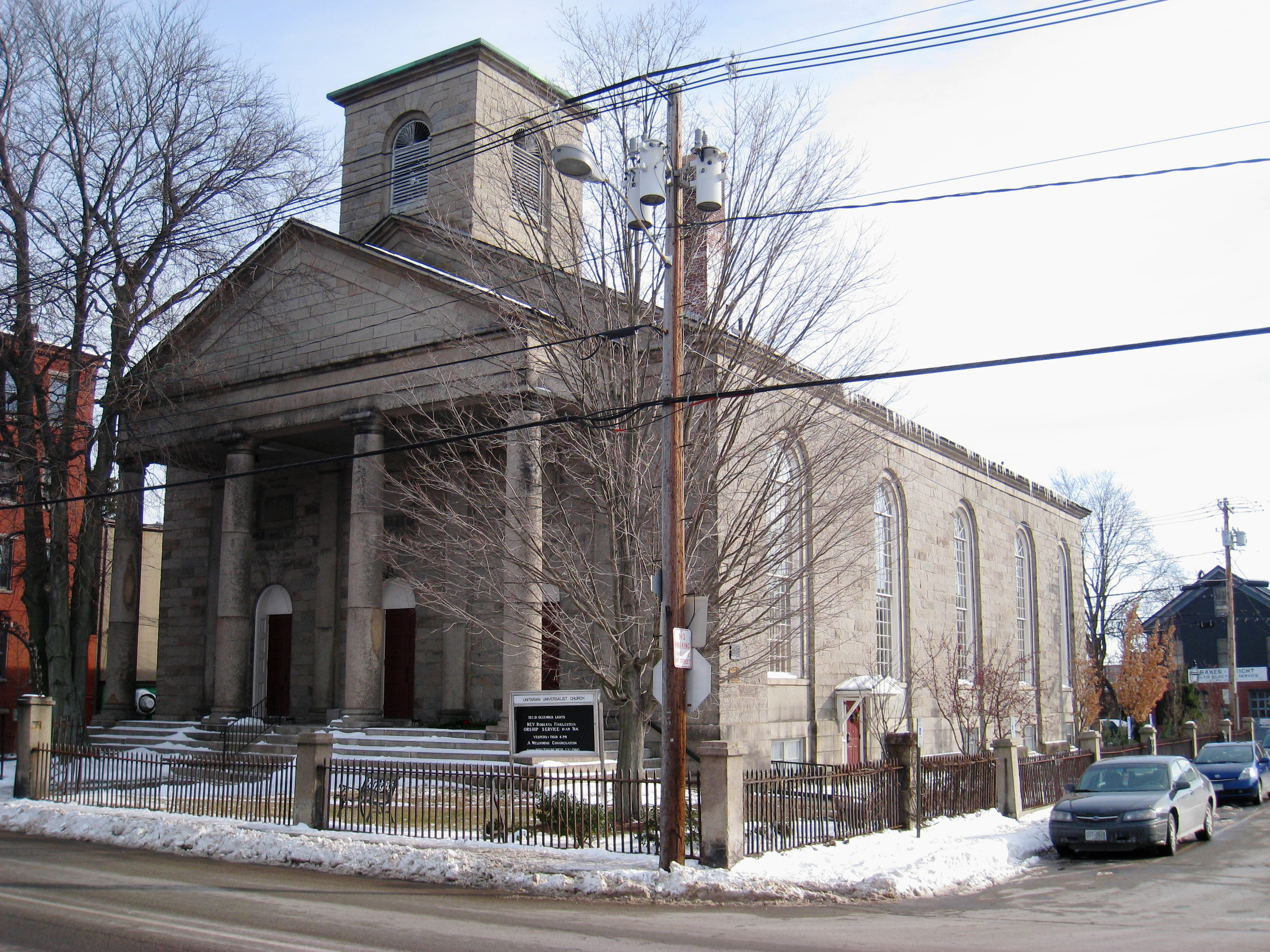

- Location within New Hampshire Location within the United States
- Location: 292 State St., Portsmouth, New Hampshire
- Coordinates: 43°4′32″N 70°45′29″W
- Area: 0.3 acres (0.12 ha)
- Built: 1824
- Architectural style: Early Republic
- NRHP reference No.: 79000210
- Added to NRHP: August 21, 1979

South Parish is the historic name of a church at 292 State Street in Portsmouth, New Hampshire, in the United States. The church building, built in 1824–26, is one of the earliest examples of Classical Revival architecture in New England, and was listed on the National Register of Historic Places in 1979.

Now known as South Church or South Unitarian Universalist Church, the congregation is a covenanting member of the Unitarian Universalist Association, and is an accredited Green Sanctuary. Unitarian Universalism is a liberal religion with Jewish-Christian roots. It has no creed. It affirms the worth of human beings, advocates freedom of belief and the search for advancing truth, and tries to provide a warm, open, supportive community for people who believe that ethical living is the supreme witness of religion. The church is a Welcoming Congregation for bisexual, gay, lesbian, and transgender people.

== Architecture and history ==
The South Parish church is located in downtown Portsmouth, at the southwest corner of State and Church streets. It is a single-story masonry structure, fashioned out of ashlar granite blocks quarried in Rockport, Massachusetts. Its gabled roof has a single-stage square belfry, topped by a low-pitch hip roof. The front facade is dominated by a four-column pedimented portico, with Tuscan columns for support. There are three entrance bays, articulated by simple pilasters. The side windows are set in round-arch openings. The interior consists of an entrance vestibule, with a single large sanctuary chamber beyond. The roof is supported by scissor trusses composed of massive timbers. The interior decorations are reflective of an 1858 enlargement and redecorating.

The church was built in 1824-26. It is the first substantial stone structure to be built in northern New England, and is an early example of the large-scale use of granite in New England architecture. Its neoclassical Greek Revival elements are a precursor to later Greek Revival structures built in the city.

== See also ==
- National Register of Historic Places listings in Rockingham County, New Hampshire
