= Anchorage Unitarian Universalist Fellowship =

- Location in Alaska
- 61°12′15″N 149°49′40″W
- Location: Anchorage, Alaska
- Country: United States
- Denomination: Unitarian Universalist
- Website: www.anchorageuuf.org

History
- Founded: 1955

The Anchorage Unitarian Universalist Fellowship is an Alaska-based congregation within the Unitarian Universalist Association. It was founded in 1955.

The congregation made headlines in 2006 for its “payment in lieu of taxes” donations to the Anchorage city government. The congregation voluntarily assessed itself for property taxes value; as a church, it is exempt from paying property taxes. The congregation stated that while it believed in the separation of church and state, it also believed in paying its fair share for the upkeep of city services including public safety and road maintenance.

On a national level, the fellowship has also been active in issues ranging from support of the Employment Non-Discrimination Act to opposition to the use of torture by U.S. agents in the war on terror.
