= Eno River Unitarian Universalist Fellowship =

Unitarian church in Durham, North Carolina

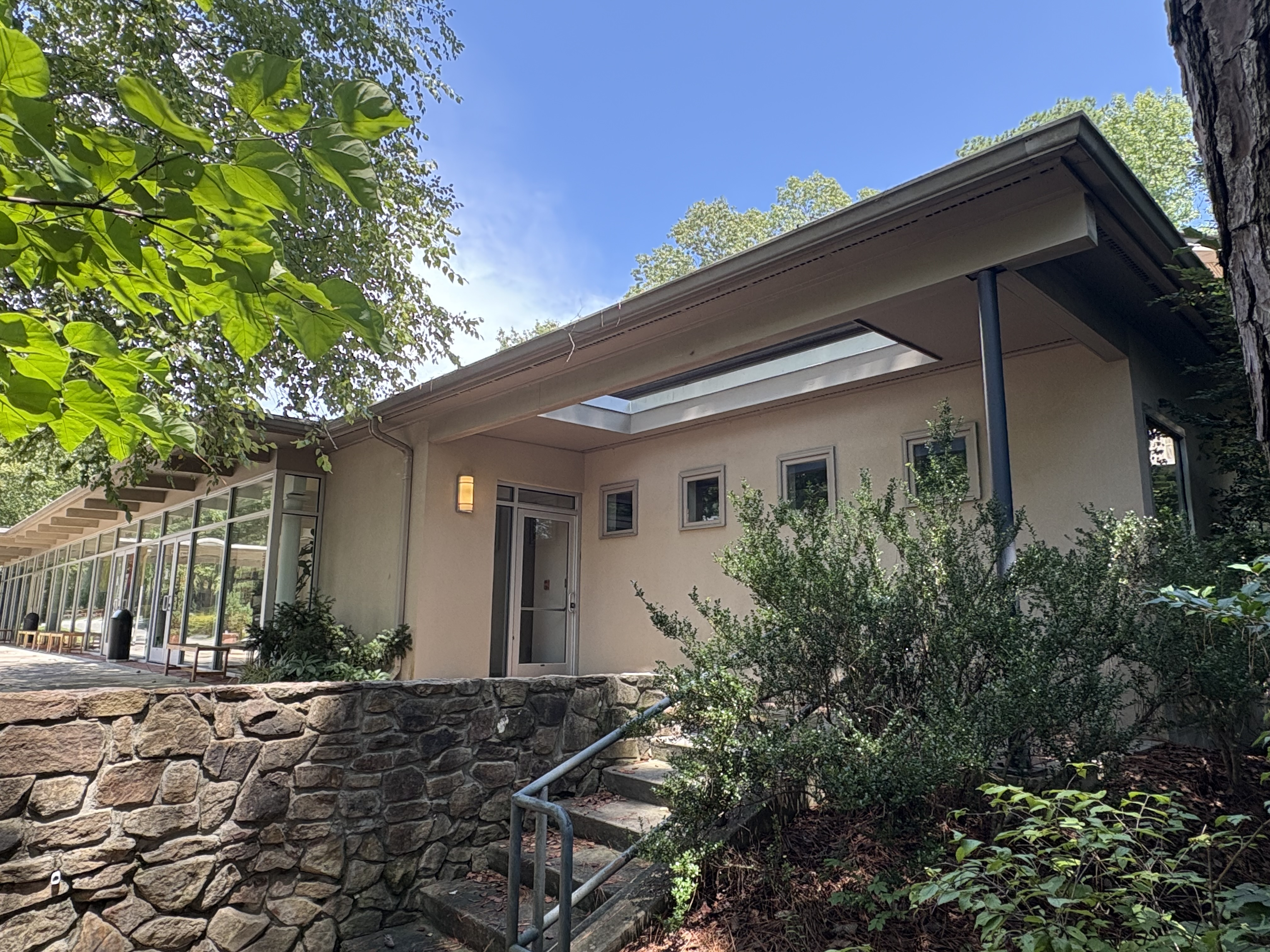
- Eno River Fellowship in 2025

Religion
- Affiliation: Unitarian Universalist
- Status: Active

Location
- Location: 4907 Garrett Road; Durham, North Carolina, United States

Website
- eruuf.org

The Eno River Unitarian Universalist Fellowship (ERUUF) is a Unitarian Universalist (UU) congregation located in Durham, North Carolina. In 2018, over seven hundred people were members of ERUUF, making it the largest UU congregation in NC and one of the largest in the UUA.

The Eno River Buddhist Community, founded in 1992, is affiliated with and meets at ERUUF. The group, which draws upon a variety of Buddhist traditions, but especially the Insight Meditation (vipassanā) tradition, "considers itself ecumenical."

One of the former ministers of ERUUF, Mary Grigolia, serves on the steering committee of the North Carolina Religious Coalition for Marriage Equality. The ERUUF is a Welcoming Congregation, which is a specific designation within the Unitarian Universalist Association for congregations that have undergone a program to increase inclusion of lesbian, gay, bisexual, and transgender people and understanding of LGBT issues.

== History ==
Between 1900 and 1925 Universalists had been active in Durham, and, in 1949, a Unitarian fellowship opened in the Durham/Chapel Hill area. In 1966, the Unitarian Universalist Fellowship of Durham and Chapel Hill opened; it changed its name in 1978 to Eno River Unitarian Universalist Fellowship.

ERUUF has been a recipient of the O. Eugene Pickett Award, which is given annually by the Unitarian Universalist Association "to the congregation that has made an outstanding contribution to the growth of Unitarian Universalism".

Members of ERUUF represent a range of beliefs and interests. In addition to the Buddhist Community, groups include a humanist group, a meditation group, a depression support group, a West African drumming group, A Course in Miracles, and a Taoist tai chi group, among others. ERUUF is inclusive of different theologies; many pagans are members. According to Rev. Arvid Straube, "We are a broad umbrella. Freedom of belief is our main tenet."

== See also ==
- LGBT-affirming churches
- Unitarian Universalist Buddhist Fellowship
