= All Souls =

All Souls may refer to:

- All Souls (film), a 1919 German silent film
- "All Souls" (The X-Files), an episode of The X-Files
- All Souls (TV series), a 2001 television supernatural drama
- All Souls College, Oxford
- All Souls' Day
- All Souls: A Family Story from Southie, a memoir by Michael Patrick MacDonald
- All Souls, a 1989 novel by Javier Marías
- All Souls (Schutt novel), a 2008 novel by Christine Schutt
- All Souls (album), a 2022 album by Siouxsie and the Banshees
- All Souls' Hospital, a defunct Catholic hospital in Morristown, New Jersey

== See also ==
- All Souls Church (disambiguation)
- Allerseelen (disambiguation)
