= Springboro Historic District =

Historic district in Ohio, United States

- U.S. National Register of Historic Places
- U.S. Historic district
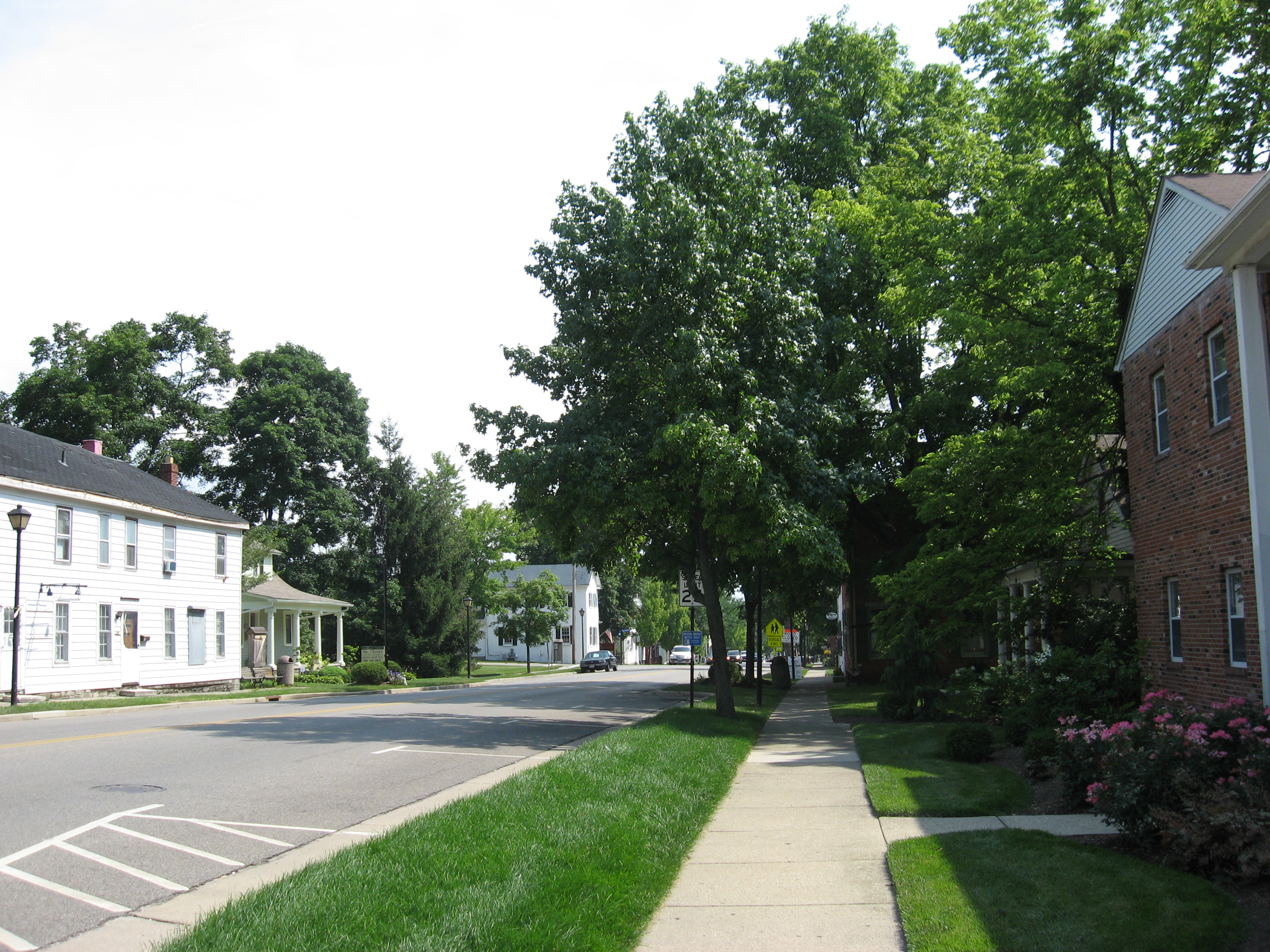

- Location within Ohio Location within the United States
- Location: Roughly bounded by Main, East, and Mill Sts., and Central Ave., Springboro, Ohio
- Coordinates: 39.555°N 84.2325°W
- Area: 50 acres (20 ha)
- Architectural style: Federal, Greek Revival
- NRHP reference No.: 99000914
- Added to NRHP: August 10, 1999

The Springboro Historic District in Springboro, Ohio is a 50-acre (20 ha) historic district that was listed on the National Register of Historic Places in 1999.

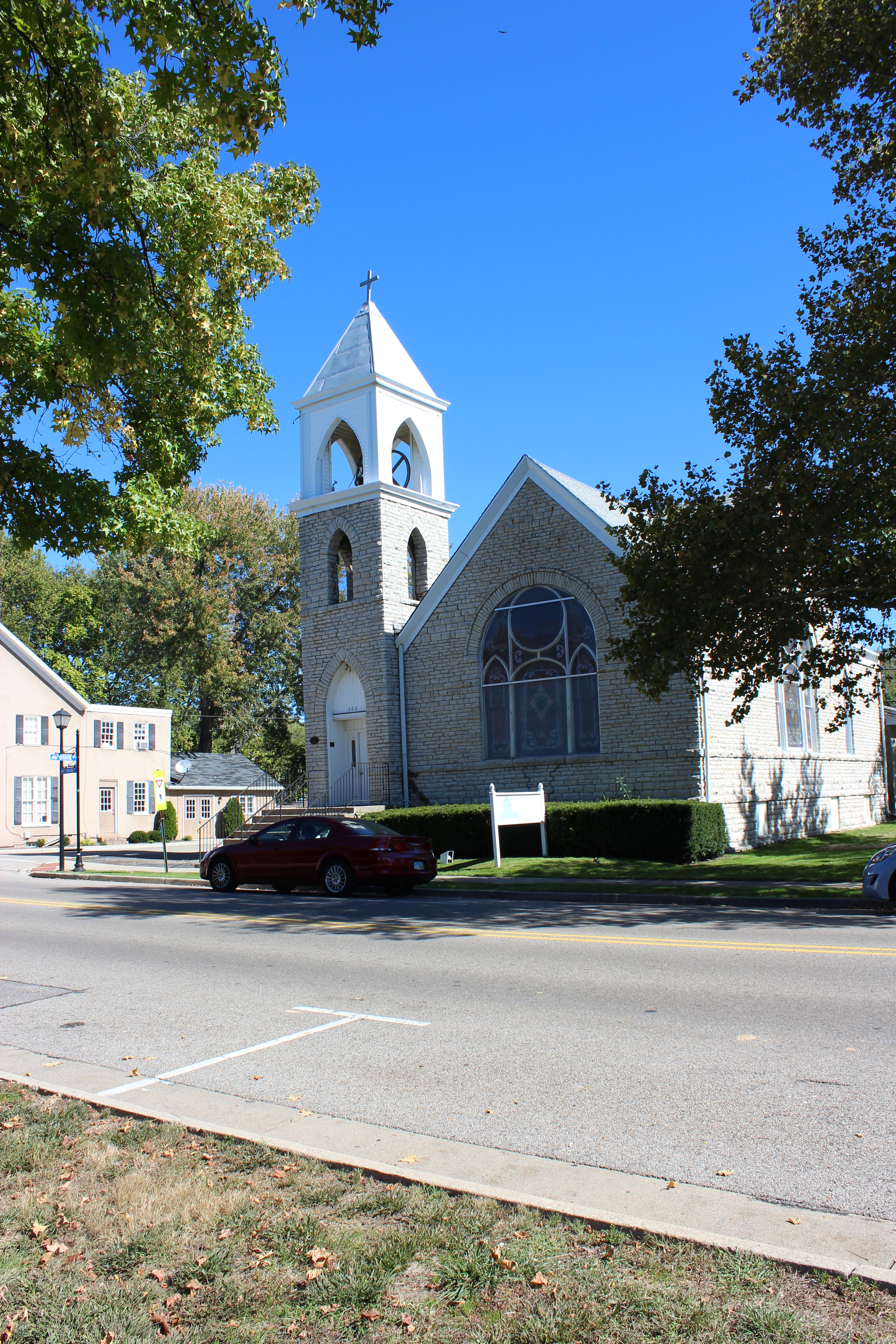
Old Stone Church

The Springboro Universalist Church or "Old Stone Church", at 300 South Main Street in the district, was built in 1905. Its congregation disbanded in the 1950s. The church building was in use by South Dayton Church of Christ in 2017.
