= Peterborough Unitarian Church =

Historic church in New Hampshire, US

- U.S. National Register of Historic Places
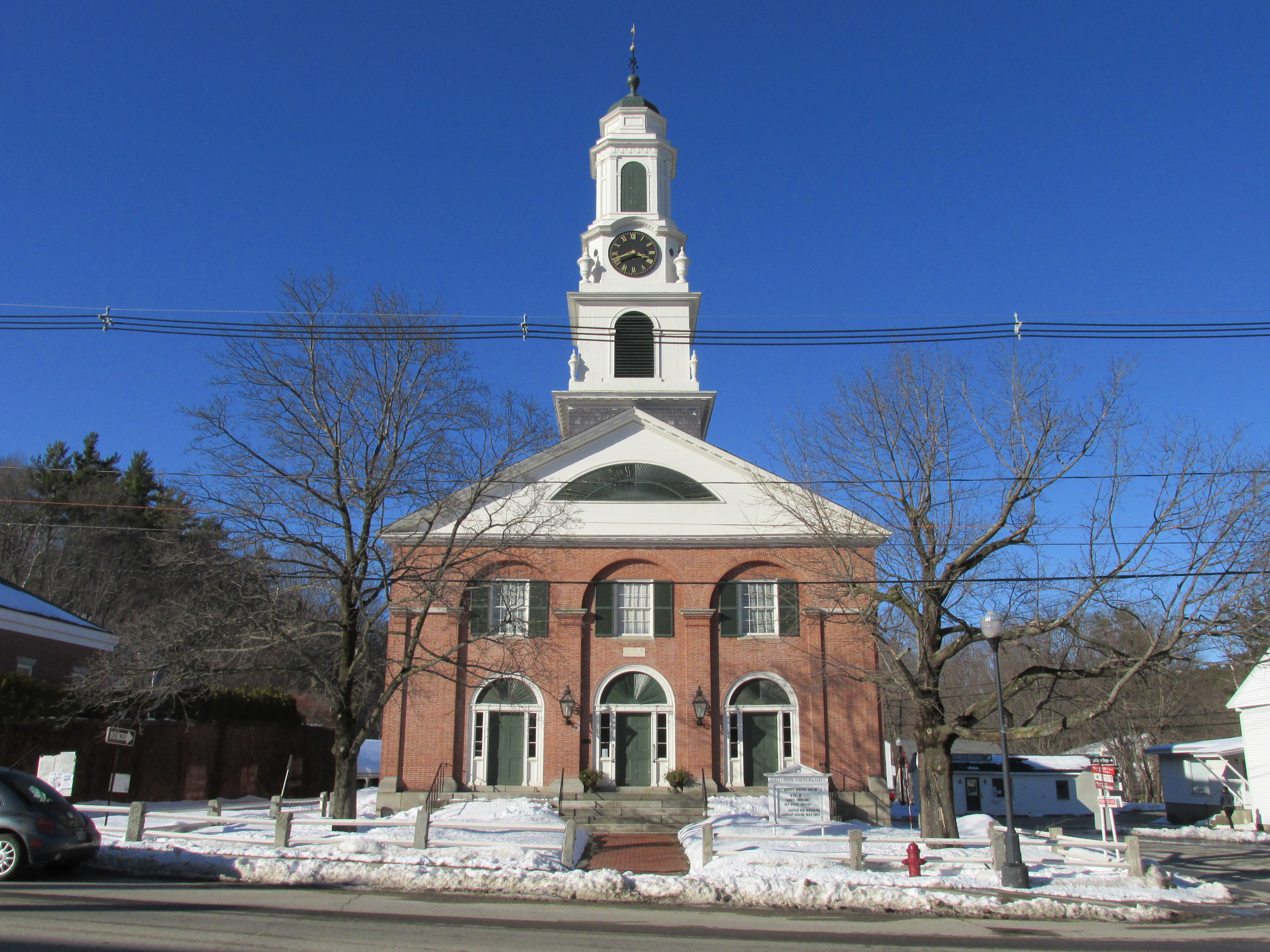
- Peterborough Unitarian Church

- Location within New Hampshire Location within the United States
- Location: Main and Summer Sts., Peterborough, New Hampshire
- Coordinates: 42°52′40″N 71°57′0″W
- Area: 0.8 acres (0.32 ha)
- Built: 1825
- Architect: Multiple
- Architectural style: Federal
- NRHP reference No.: 73000165
- Added to NRHP: April 23, 1973

The Peterborough Unitarian Church, also once known as the First Church in Peterborough, is a historic American church at Main and Summer streets in Peterborough, New Hampshire. Built in 1825-26 for a congregation founded in 1752, it is one of the state's finest examples of a Federal period church, drawing inspiration from the publications of Asher Benjamin. The building was listed on the National Register of Historic Places in 1973.

== Description and history ==
The Peterborough Unitarian Church stands prominently in the town center of Peterborough, at the northwest corner of Main and Summer streets. It is a single-story brick building, with a gabled roof and a multistage tower. The tower, set above the front facade, has a square first stage with round-arch louvers, an octagonal clock stage, an octagonal belfry, and a cupola crowned by a cross. The interior has a vestibule area, whose inner wall dividing it from the main space helps support the tower, and a galleried hall. Interior decorations are partly reflective of later 19th-century alterations, including the placement of pulpit and sounding board, and the trompe-l'œil artwork.

The church was built in 1825-26 for a congregation that was established in 1752. Its design was at one time attributed to Charles Bulfinch, but there is no documentary evidence that supports this connection, and the building clearly has Federal-style elements inspired by the publications of Asher Benjamin. The clock in its tower is owned by the town; the first was installed in 1856, the present one in 1947. The bell was installed in 1828.

== See also ==
- National Register of Historic Places listings in Hillsborough County, New Hampshire
