= Unitarian Church of Barnstable =

Church in Massachusetts, U.S.

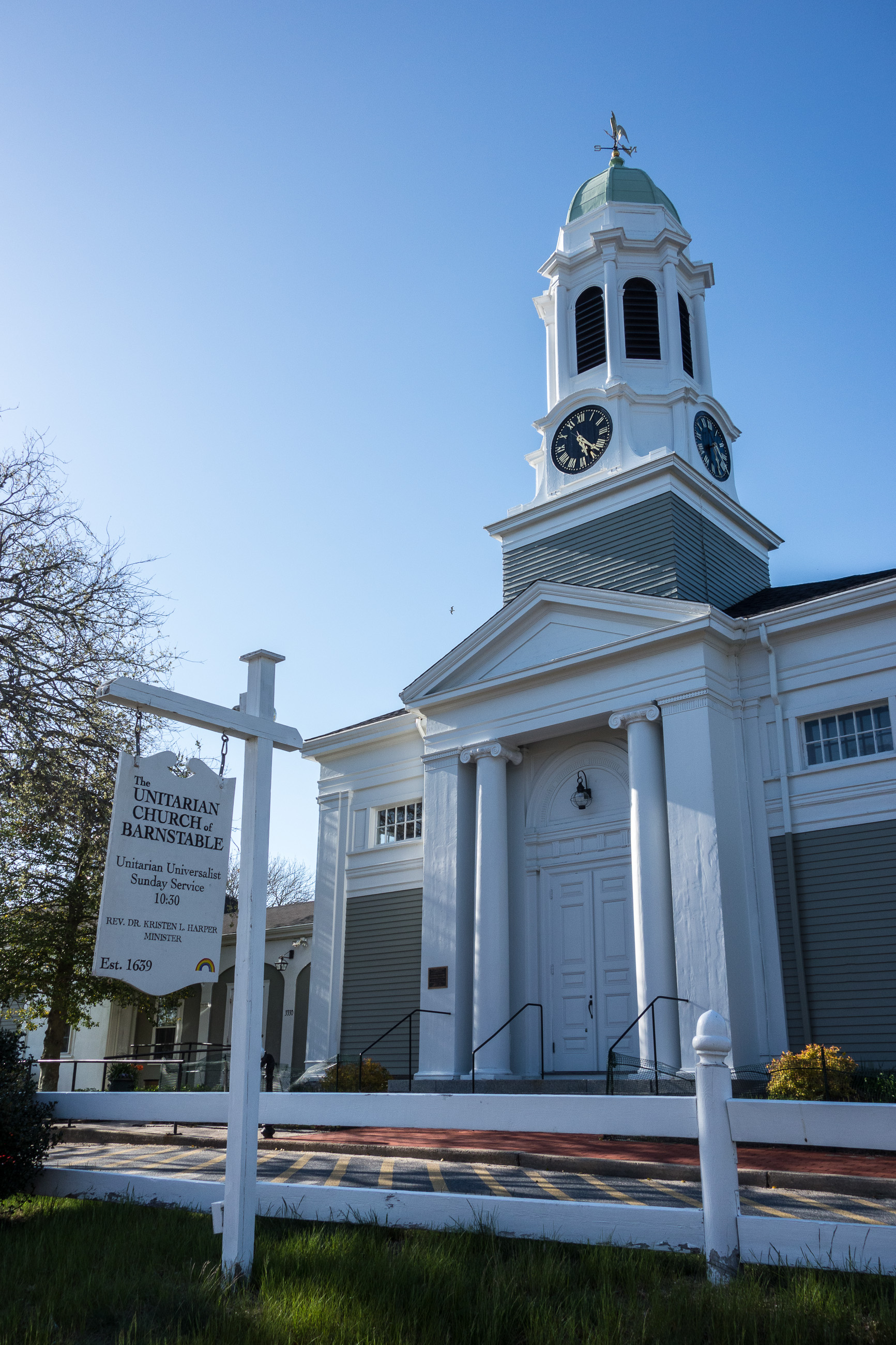

Religion
- Affiliation: Unitarian Universalist
- Leadership: Rev. Dr. Kristen L. Harper
- Status: Active

Location
- Location: 3330 Main St, Barnstable, Massachusetts
- Interactive map of Unitarian Church of Barnstable
- Coordinates: 41°42′2.14″N 71°17′55.95″W

Architecture
- Completed: 1907

Website
- http://www.barnstableuu.org

The Unitarian Church of Barnstable is a historic church located on Old King's Highway Historic District in Barnstable, Massachusetts. The congregation was established in 1639, and the current building dates to 1907. A short walk from the church is Barnstable village and Barnstable Harbor. The senior minister, Rev. Dr. Kristen L. Harper, was the second woman of African descent to become a Unitarian Universalist minister. There is a pipe organ located in the sanctuary balcony and a church choir that sings during services. The congregation comes from a variety of religious and philosophical backgrounds including Catholic, Jewish, Protestant, Buddhist, agnostic, atheist, humanist, and others. The traditional weekly water communion portion of the Sunday service, which is open to anyone, is done with local beach stones. A children and youth ministry helps create the essential building blocks for a spiritual, loving, healthy, compassionate, and proactive community.

The church is a designated "Welcoming Congregation" which means it is fully open to the needs and concerns of lesbians, gays, bisexuals, and transgender persons. The church is also a designated "Green Sanctuary". As such the church takes an active role in environmental issues and environmental justice. Twice a year the Green Sanctuary coordinates with the children of the church to celebrate Earth Day and to honor sustainable practices. In 2018 the church became the first in the nation to have solar panels facing a historic highway (Route 6A also known as The Olde King's Highway).
