= All Souls Church (Augusta, Maine) =

Historic church in Maine, United States

- U.S. National Register of Historic Places
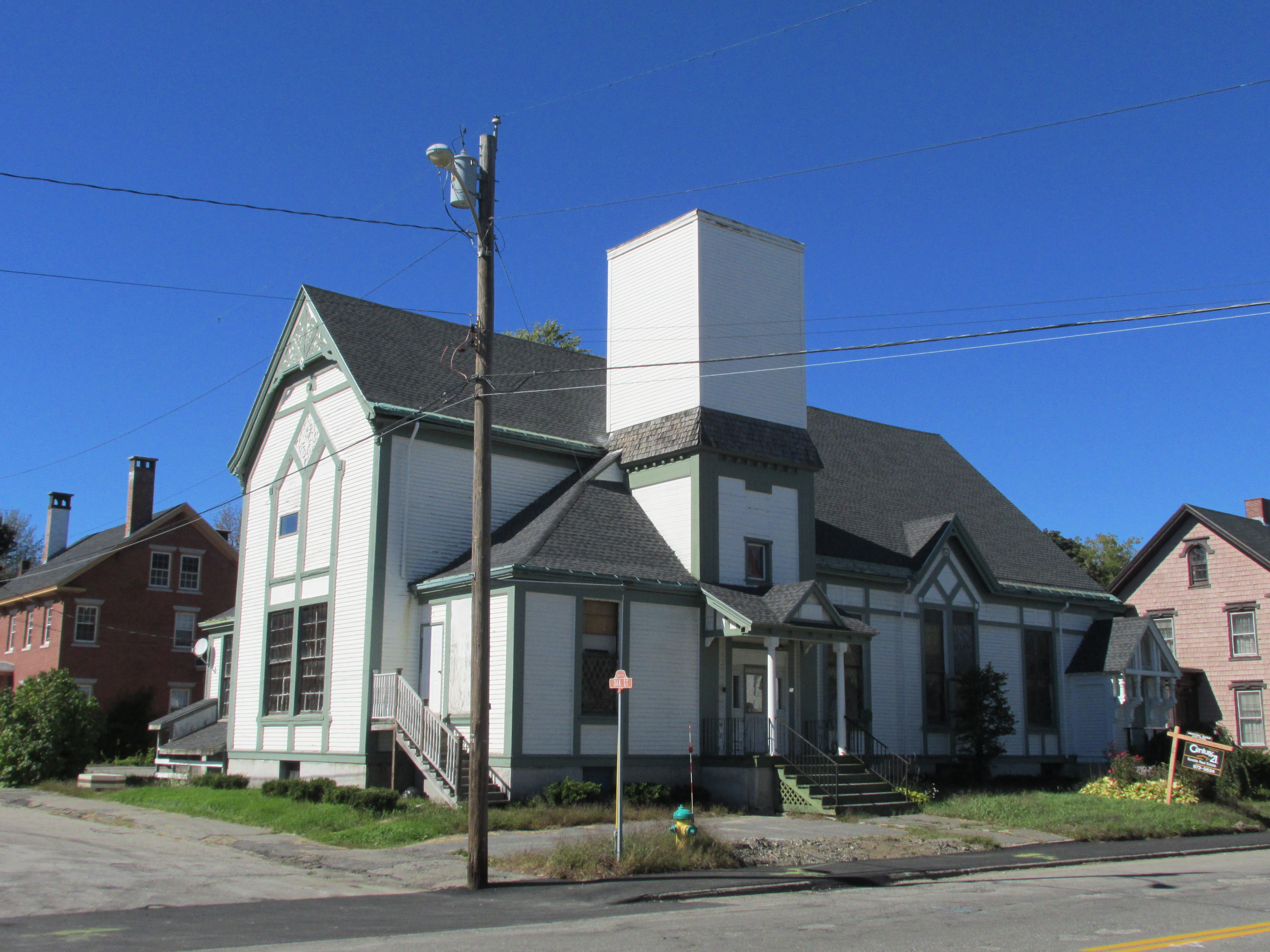
- Alls Souls Church

- Location within Maine Location within the United States
- Location: 70 State St., Augusta, Maine
- Coordinates: 44°18′59″N 69°46′38″W
- Area: 1 acre (0.40 ha)
- Built: 1879
- Architect: Silloway & Cobb
- Architectural style: Stick-Eastlake
- NRHP reference No.: 78000178
- Added to NRHP: January 31, 1978

The All Souls Church is a historic former church building at 70 State Street in Augusta, Maine. Built in 1879, it is one of Maine's finest examples of Stick style architecture. The building was listed on the National Register of Historic Places in 1978.

== Description and history ==
The former All Souls Church building is located in central Augusta, at the northwest corner of Oak and State Streets. It is a two-story wood frame structure, with a gabled roof, clapboarded exterior, and granite foundation. A square tower projects from the State Street side, now consisting of two relatively plain stages separated by a skirt of roofing. The State Street facade is visually complex, with gabled entrances in the tower and at the north end, and a small cross gable between, with applied woodwork above a pair of tall sash windows. The Oak Street facade has a pair of large sash windows, framed by similar applied trim which rises to a point in the gable above, with a square carved panel at its point, and another elaborate panel mounted at the peak of the gable.

The church was built in 1879 for a Unitarian congregation established in 1825 by a division of older congregations, and was its third home. It was designed by Thomas Silloway, a native of Newburyport, Massachusetts whose most prominent work is the Vermont State House. It is a particularly fine example of Stick style architecture, a style that is not widespread in Maine. In 1987, the building was purchased by the River Rock congregation, which occupied it until 2008, when it moved to Chelsea.

== See also ==
- National Register of Historic Places listings in Kennebec County, Maine
