= Pacific Unitarian Church =

- Location in Los Angeles County
- 33.7890242°N 118.3794227°W
- Location: Rancho Palos Verdes, California
- Country: United States
- Denomination: Unitarian Universalist
- Website: pacificunitarian.org

History
- Founded: 1957

Pacific Unitarian Church is a Unitarian Universalist congregation located in Rancho Palos Verdes, California. It is a member of the Unitarian Universalist Association of Congregations, within the Pacific Southwest District. PUC was recognized as one of four "Breakthrough Congregations" in 2008, reflected in a $75,000 donation to Community Church UU of New Orleans. Membership as of 2019 is around 180 with weekly attendance averaging over 90 adults and children.

== History ==
Pacific Unitarian Church was conceived in February 1957, by a group from the Palos Verdes-South Bay area of greater Los Angeles, under the guidance of the Rev. Dr. Harry Andrew Shuder, a retired Unitarian minister. Dr. Shuder volunteered his services as part-time minister to the group. March 17, 1957, the Pacific Unitarian Church Society was born at 11 a.m. in Walteria Park Recreation Building in Torrance, California. With few exceptions, the church has held services weekly since that first St. Patrick's Day. The first session of church school was held on Easter Sunday, April 21, 1957. The word "Society" was soon dropped from the title, and PUC settled into ministering to Unitarians, Universalists, and other religious liberals in the South Bay area. Over its lifetime, PUC has met in four locations. Services moved from Walteria Park to the Torrance Seventh Day Adventist Church in May 1957 and continued at that location until 1961, with church school held on that premises and at nearby YWCA buildings. Pacific Unitarian Church registered as a nonprofit corporation in California on 29 January 1959. In 1961, PUC rented quarters at Miraleste School on the Palos Verdes Peninsula. Property upon which to build was purchased in Torrance, but sold when a more desirable site in Rancho Palos Verdes became available, where the facilities PUC occupies today were completed in 1965. The first service at the current site was an impromptu memorial to President John F. Kennedy, held outdoors overlooking the canyon and the Beach cities. The mortgage was paid off in July 1992.

=== Ministers ===
In 1957 Dr. Shuder volunteered to serve for one year as part-time charter minister. When he left, the congregation decided to call a full-time minister, the Rev. Mr. Richard W. F. Seebode, who began his ministry to PUC in October 1958. He retired from the ministry in 1963 and pursued a second career in counseling.

PUC then called the Rev. Mr. Alfred J. N. Henriksen to the pulpit in 1963 after a nationwide search. Under his leadership the congregation raised the money to buy the land in PV and to build the church. He served this church until 1987 (24 years) when, at age 65, he retired. His wife, Ruth, who through his years of service was an integral part of his ministerial success, died suddenly in 1987 shortly after they announced retirement plans. Her death was a great loss not only to Mr. Henriksen, but to the entire congregation. Mr. Henriksen was named Minister Emeritus after his retirement, and the main building was designated Henriksen Hall in honor of the long service of both him and his wife. Mr. Henriksen remains an active member of PUC.

PUC then called the Rev. Mr. David H. Cole as interim minister. Mr. Cole served the congregation for a year and a half.

The Rev. Mr. W. Donald Beaudreault began his ministry to the PUC in January 1989, and served until the summer of 1993, when he tendered his resignation.

The church operated without a minister until January 1994, when the Rev. Dr. Victor Carpenter accepted the call as interim minister, serving through June 1994, when he was called as a settled minister in Boston.

The Rev. Ms. Frances Reece Day joined PUC on September 1, 1994 as interim minister and remained with PUC through July 1996.

In August 1996, the Rev. Ms. Jane Bechle and the Rev. Mr. Robert J. Klein were called to PUC as settled co-ministers, and served until August 2004.

The Rev. Dr. John T. Morehouse served as called minister from 2005 to 2015, when he was called to lead the Westport Unitarian Church in Connecticut.

Stephen Furrer joined the congregation in August 2016 for a one-year term as intern Minister.

Reverend Steve Wilson was called as the next full-time minister and served from August 18, 2017 to July, 2022.

Chloe Briede began her two year contract as Interim Minister in August, 2022.

Pastor Joshua Berg was called as the new Settled Minister starting in September, 2024.

== Social action ==
The following is a brief summary of social activism PUC supported through its storied history:

=== 1950s ===
- Southwood Housing tract-restrictive code (Jack Lytle)

=== 1960s ===
- John Birch Society invited to speak at PUC – Open to all ideas
- Memorials: John & Robert Kennedy, Martin Luther King Assassinations
- Speakers against War in Vietnam – Jane Fonda, Tom Hayden
- Resource for anti-draft counseling, how to file "conscience objector" status

=== 1970s ===
- United Farm Workers of America – Fiona Knox
- Five members of the congregation were arrested for demonstration against purchasing of table grapes & Gallo Wine at Boys Supermarket, Carson. Accused of harassing customers. Four women were stripped-searched, held 24 hours. As a result, we sued L.A. County. Took seven years to go through courts. Had the backing of the minister and entire Congregation. As a result of this suit, State Supreme Court changed strip-search procedures in California.
- Dow Chemical – demonstration against use of Napalm

Montrose Chemical Co. – letter writing, demonstration against dumping of tons of DDT off coast of Palos Verdes Peninsula. Plant defunct, efforts at clean-up

=== 1980s ===
- UUSC Peace Study on Central America – Taught by Fiona Knox
- UUSC Trips to Central America – Barbara Karg, Fiona Knox, Dorian Tippet (Spoke at other UU churches about Latin American conflict and CIA involvement)
- Church voted to become a “Sanctuary Support” Church, raising money for those fleeing war-torn Guatemala, El Salvador, Nicaragua
- Nuclear Disarmament – Ed Hummel
- Jack and Johanna Lytle brought Cambodian Family to U.S. with church support

=== 1990s ===
- Welcoming Congregation
- OWL Program – Religious Education
- Racial Justice Towards Wholeness – speakers, trainers, struggles with ministers
- Following attack of Temple in Valley, Congregation made commitment to be in Solidarity with Jews. Made a human chain to protect P.V. Temple
- AME Church – Food distribution, Ed Hummel, John Stanbery

=== 2000s ===
- Environmental Priorities Network, South Bay Interfaith Council – Lillian Light, Ed Hummel (and many others)
- 9/11 Memorial, Service of Support/Fellowship with Islamic Center
- Anti-Iraq War demonstrations 2003–2007, visits to Congress, letter-writing, etc.
- Film Documentary Series – Corporations, War, Environment – Carolyn Waters
- Against closure of Central L.A. Community Garden, Bill Ungar, Rachel Bruhnke
- Wilmington Community Gardens – Nancy Hofland
- HealthCare For All Californians – Lori Geittman, Ray Waters
- Support Same Sex Marriage – Prop 8 demonstration Long Beach Court House – Maurice Chevalier, Brad Shreve (many others)
- AIDS Walks with kids
- Peace-Making – Ed Hummel, Bill Ungar
- Anti-Torture – Clay Bosler
- Green Sanctuary Project
- Support for Harbor Interfaith Society
- Support for earthquake victims in Nepal
- Gay Pride Parade
- Laundry Love - helping the homeless to have clean clothes
- Anti Racism with Multicultural Transformation Team
- Climate Action
