= United Unitarian and Universalist Church =

Historic church in Wisconsin, United States

- United Unitarian and Universalist Congregation
- U.S. National Register of Historic Places
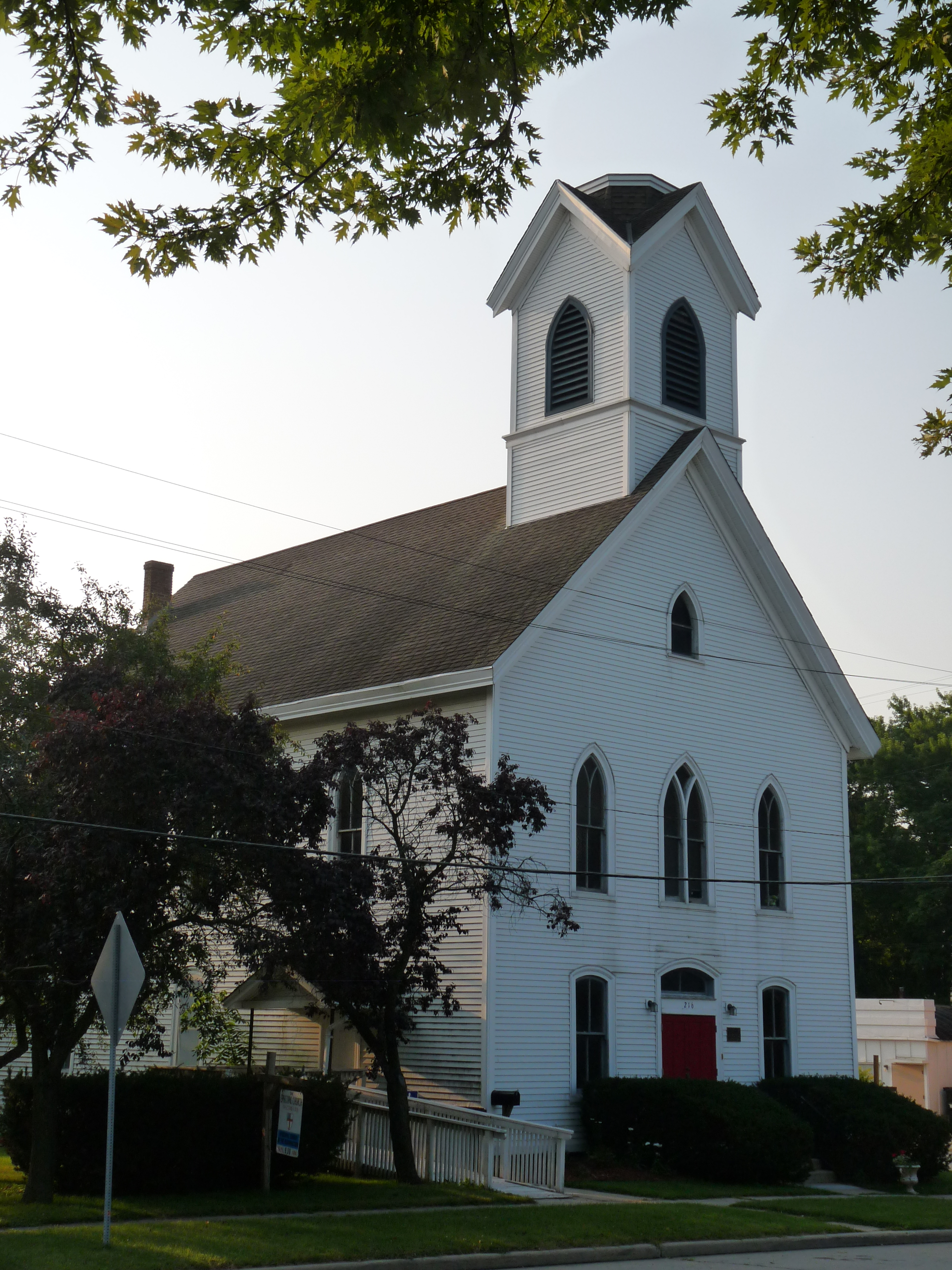

- Location within Wisconsin Location within the United States
- Location: 216 Main St., Mukwonago, Wisconsin
- Coordinates: 42°51′43″N 88°19′55″W
- Area: less than one acre
- Built: 1878
- Architectural style: Gothic
- NRHP reference No.: 87001759
- Added to NRHP: October 1, 1987

The United Unitarian and Universalist Church in Mukwonago, Wisconsin is a Victorian Gothic-styled church and meeting hall built in 1878 - the only Yankee-built church remaining in the town. In 1987 it was added to the National Register of Historic Places for its significance in architecture and social history.

Mukwonago was founded in 1836 by three Yankees from New England. Forty years later, two of those founders were still alive and helped to found this church. Sewell Andrews was a Universalist and Martin Field was a Unitarian. These were two separate denominations at the time, which would not formally merge for eighty years, but in Mukwonago they decided to form a joint congregation, chartering the town's Unitarian and Universalist church society in 1877.

The following year the society started building its church right in the middle of Mukwonago, a block south of the main intersection and across the street from the homes of Andrews and Field. They chose an unusual but practical model for their building, with a public meeting hall on the first floor and worship space above. The style of the building is a pretty standard white frame church like what the founders probably knew from New England. The styling is Victorian Gothic, characterized by strict symmetry and the pointed arches in all the upper openings, all pointing to heaven. The steeple was originally topped with a spire, but that was removed after it was struck by lightning around 1906. The windows of the first floor public meeting hall are less "churchy," with round-topped arches.

The new building was dedicated in August 1879, with a dedication sermon from Olympia Brown, the first woman ordained as a minister in the U.S. and a women's suffragette. Brown preached part-time at the church for years after. Some other early women ministers included Carrie Rice, Nellie Opdahl, and Florence Pollack, attesting to the congregation's liberal leaning for the time.

The public hall downstairs hosted many other organizations, including the local Good Templars, the Women's Christian Temperance Union, the Territorial Badgers, the Modern Woodmen, the Royal Neighbors, the village's creamery company, the Farmer's Mutual Insurance Company, along with town meetings. The building was shared with other denominations before they could build their own churches, including the German Lutheran Church, the Catholic Advancement Association, the Methodist Episcopal Society, and the United Church of Christ.

Mukwonago had two other early churches from the same era - the 1872 Congregational church and the 1879 Baptist church - but both were demolished in the 1970s or 80s, leaving the Unitarian Universalist church as the only survivor from that Yankee era. The UU church is very little changed from when it was built, other than the missing spire.

In 2007 the Unitarian Universalist congregation moved from this building into Waukesha and this building was bought by the Episcopal Church of the Resurrection.
