= First Unitarian Universalist Church of Niagara =

Historic church in New York, United States

- U.S. National Register of Historic Places
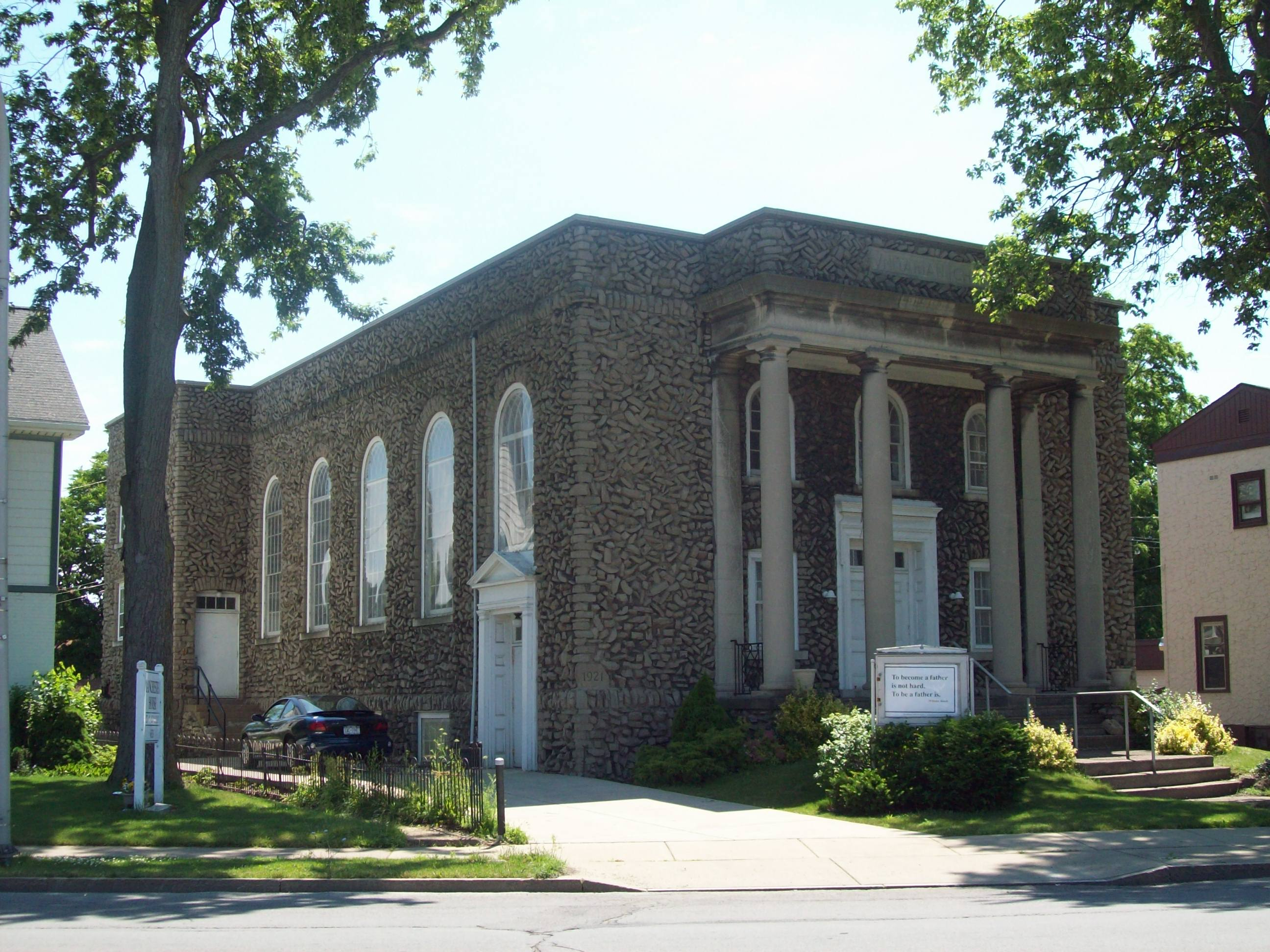
- First Unitarian Universalist Church of Niagara, June 2009

- Location within New York Location within the United States
- Location: 639 Main St., Niagara Falls, New York
- Coordinates: 43°05′37″N 79°03′23″W
- Architect: Kirkpatrick & Cannon
- Architectural style: Classical Revival
- NRHP reference No.: 06001301
- Added to NRHP: January 25, 2007

First Unitarian Universalist Church of Niagara is a historic church located at Niagara Falls in Niagara County, New York. It was constructed in 1921 in a Classical Revival style. The steel and concrete church is faced with rough, uncut limestone from the bedrock excavated for the building's foundation.

It was listed on the National Register of Historic Places in 2007.
