= Universalist-Unitarian Church =

Historic church in Maine, United States

- Universalist Unitarian Church
- U.S. National Register of Historic Places
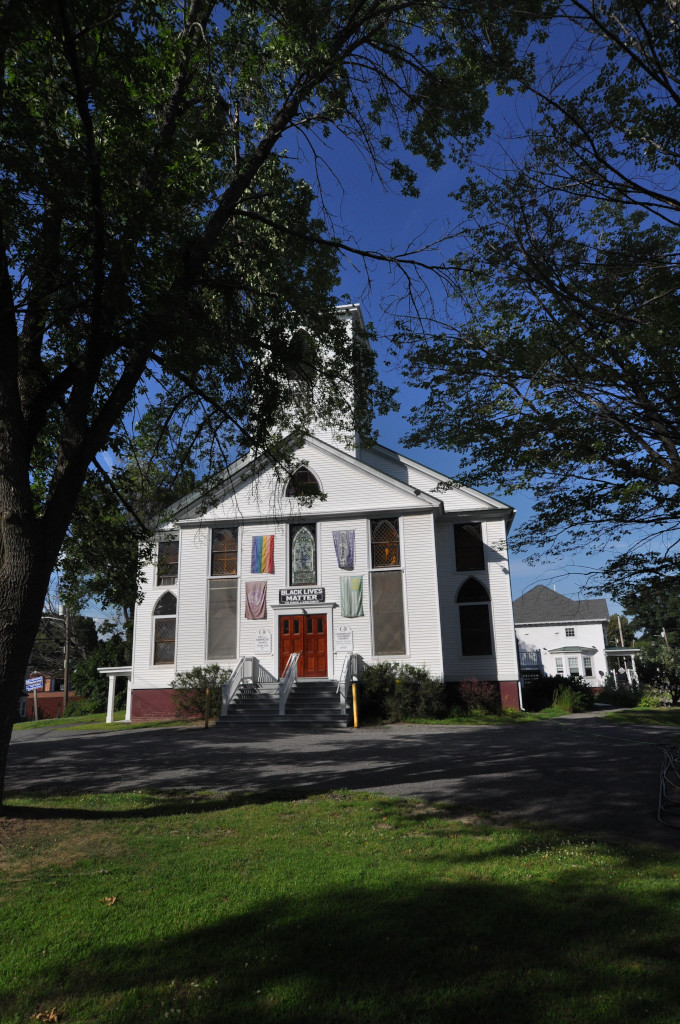
- 1910 postcard view

- Location within Maine Location within the United States
- Location: 69 Silver St., Waterville, Maine
- Coordinates: 44°32′48″N 69°38′9″W
- Area: 1 acre (0.40 ha)
- Built: 1832
- Architectural style: Gothic Revival, Federal
- NRHP reference No.: 78000181
- Added to NRHP: February 17, 1978

The Universalist Unitarian Church is a historic church at the intersection of Silver Street and Elm Street in Waterville, Maine in the United States. Built in 1832 for a Universalist congregation founded in 1826, it is a prominent local example of transitional Federal-Gothic Revival architecture. It was listed on the National Register of Historic Places in 1978.

== History ==
For over 200 years, the Universalist Unitarian Church of Waterville, Maine has been part of the spiritual, religious and social life of the community. Two local churches combined to form the church as it is known today, a decade before the national merger of the two denominations into one.

In 1798, Thomas Barnes, a circuit minister, organized the Eastern Maine Association of Universalists. He held meetings in Winthrop, Waterville, Oakland and other nearby places. He was the first Universalist minister in the District of Maine in 1802.

In 1820, Reverend Sylvanus Cobb of Norway, the second Universalist minister ordained in Maine, preached in Waterville for the first time. On May 28, 1826, he organized the first Universalist Church in Maine. The church had twenty members and met in Rev. Cobb's Waterville home. By 1831, the society became formally organized and decided to build a church. Jediah Morrill converted to the faith and gave the largest donation to the building fund. On July 9, 1832, the present church was finished and furnished with 60 pews at a cost of $4,100. It was dedicated in January of the following year. Members raised $360 to purchase a bell and Jediah Morrill gave the clock costing $350. That same year, Rev. Calvin Gardiner began his twenty-year ministry. The church struggled financially over the years, sometimes closing for a year or two at a time.

In 1894, the church was badly damaged by a chimney fire. As part of the building's repair, the church was turned to face the point where Elm and Silver Streets meet. A new organ was purchased and stained glass windows were given by members and church groups. In 1921, the church building was raised and the Averill Parlors constructed in the new basement.

The Unitarian church was founded in 1866 and built on Main Street in Waterville. By 1927, it was having a hard time financially, and the two churches talked of merging. The situation worsened by 1936 to the point where the Unitarians decided to close their church. In 1952, the two churches, along with the Church of the Good Shepherd in Fairfield, united to form the Universalist Unitarian Church of Waterville.

The classic bell tower whose clock was once considered the town clock was in serious danger of collapsing by 2008. The tower was taken down and sold at auction along with the clock and lightning rod. A new bell tower was constructed in time for the Christmas Eve service that year.

== Architecture ==
The church stands facing south toward a small triangular park formed by the junction of Silver and Elm Streets, south of downtown Waterville. It is a single-story wood-frame structure, with a gabled roof, clapboard siding, and granite foundation. Rising from the roof is a two-stage square tower, with a clock in the first stage, an open octagonal belfry as the second, and a bowed octagonal roof above. The openings in the belfry have Gothic pointed arches, a detail repeated in fans above some of the building's windows, and in the gable front of the facade.

== See also ==
- National Register of Historic Places listings in Kennebec County, Maine
