= Unitarian Universalist Church (Stamford, Connecticut) =

Historic church in Connecticut, United States

- Unitarian-Universalist Congregation in Stamford (UUC Stamford)
- U.S. National Register of Historic Places
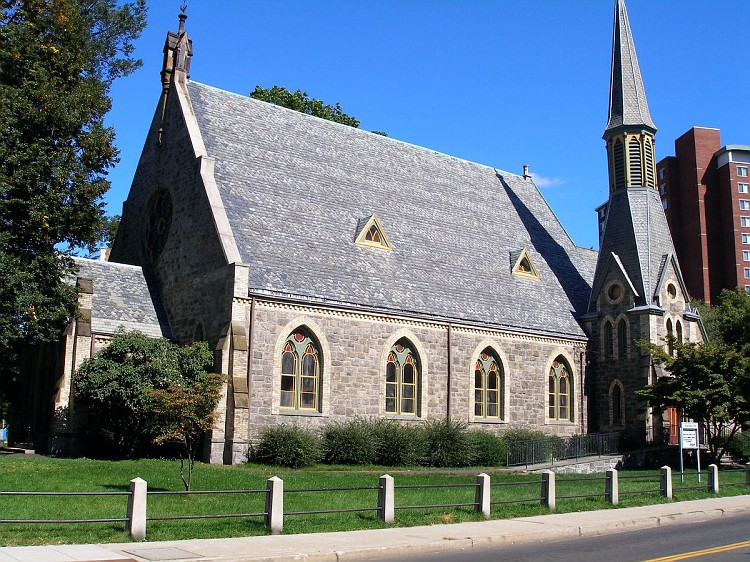

- Location within Connecticut Location within the United States
- Location: 20 Forest Street, Stamford, Connecticut
- Coordinates: 41°3′27″N 73°32′14″W
- Area: less than one acre
- Built: 1870
- Architect: Gage Inslee
- Architectural style: Gothic, English Country Gothic
- MPS: Downtown Stamford Ecclesiastical Complexes TR
- NRHP reference No.: 87002126
- Added to NRHP: December 24, 1987

The Unitarian Universalist Congregation in Stamford (UUC Stamford) is a liberal religious community located at 20 Forest Street in downtown Stamford, Connecticut.

Originally established in the 19th century as a Universalist church, UUC Stamford is now a Unitarian Universalist congregation and a member of the Unitarian Universalist Association (UUA).

UUC Stamford's main building is a historic, modestly sized Gothic Revival structure. Designed by Stamford architect Gage Inslee, it was constructed in 1870 using fieldstone, brick, and granite.

While most of the main building's exterior windows are stenciled to imitate stained glass, the choir loft contains two authentic stained glass windows, believed to be from the 14th to 17th centuries, which were brought to the congregation by parishioner Thomas Crane.

Adjacent to the main building is the church rectory, completed in 1880, which is a notable example of Victorian Gothic architecture with early elements of Queen Anne styling.

UUC Stamford's complex was listed on the National Register of Historic Places in 1987.

== See also ==
- National Register of Historic Places listings in Stamford, Connecticut
