= First Universalist Church (Cincinnati, Ohio) =

- U.S. National Register of Historic Places
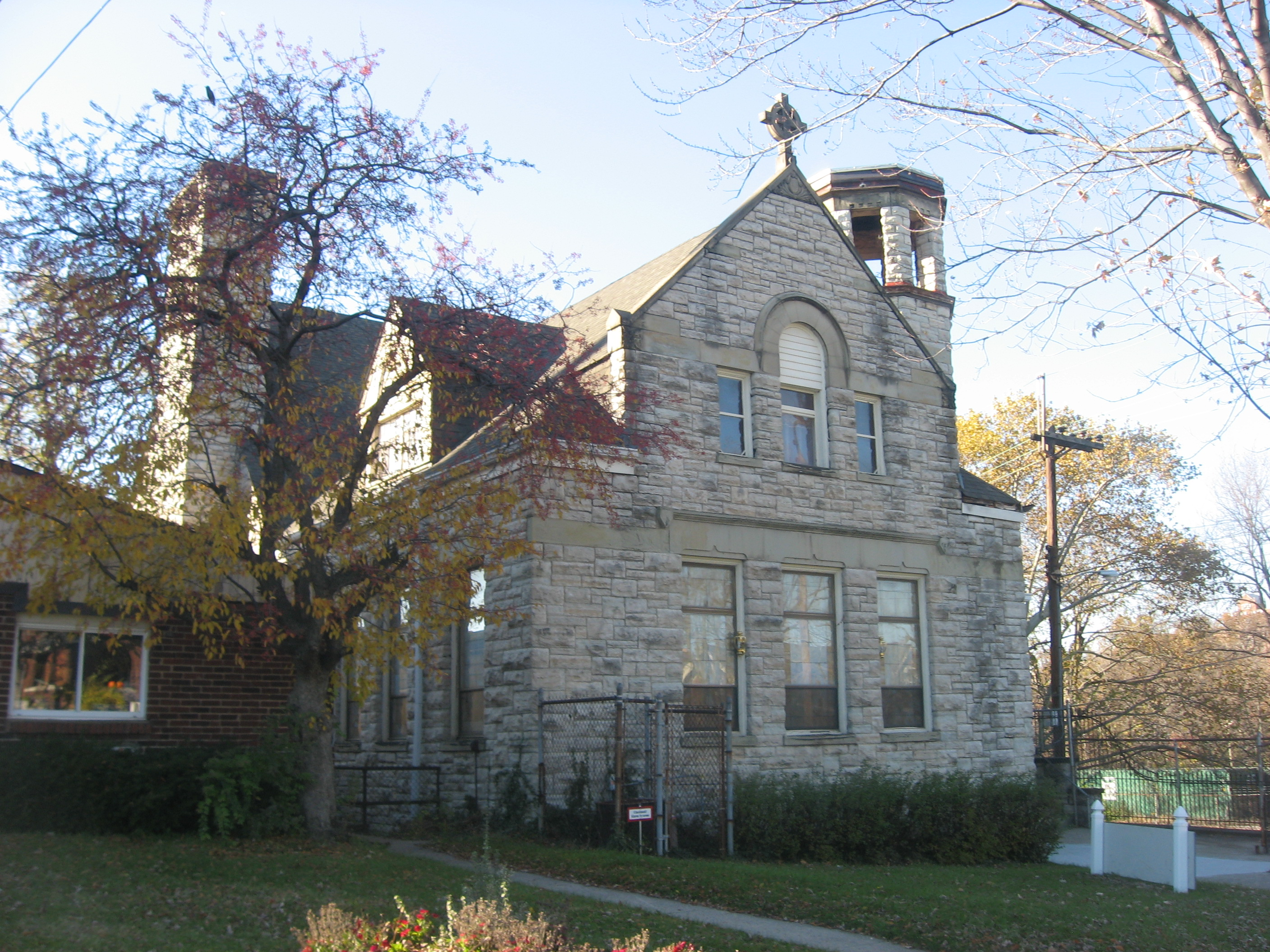
- Front of the church

- Location within Ohio Location within the United States
- Location: Cincinnati, Ohio
- Coordinates: 39°7′40.19″N 84°29′53.55″W
- Architect: Samuel Hannaford & Sons
- Architectural style: Romanesque
- MPS: Samuel Hannaford and Sons TR in Hamilton County
- NRHP reference No.: 80003055
- Added to NRHP: March 3, 1980

First Universalist Church is a registered historic building in Cincinnati, Ohio, listed in the National Register on March 3, 1980.

== Historic uses ==
- Religious Structure

This church incorporated as City Temple—First Universalist Church was the result of a merger between the "First Universalist Church of Cincinnati" and the "New Thought Temple". It was located on Essex Place in the Walnut Hills section of Cincinnati. The church has stained glass windows dedicated to early Cincinnatians such as the poets Alice Cary and Phoebe Cary. The tower was at some point capped with a conical steeple-like roof and topped with a stone cross. There was an ink drawing of it published in the Cincinnati Enquirer by Carolyn Williams. In the drawing that roof is shown.

The founder of the New Thought Temple was Dr. Harry Grannison Hall, he and his followers found a home in the Universalist Church and eventually blended into that organization. The church later moved its location and changed its name to Heritage Universalist Unitarian Church.
