= First Universalist Church of Cedar Rapids =

- U.S. National Register of Historic Places
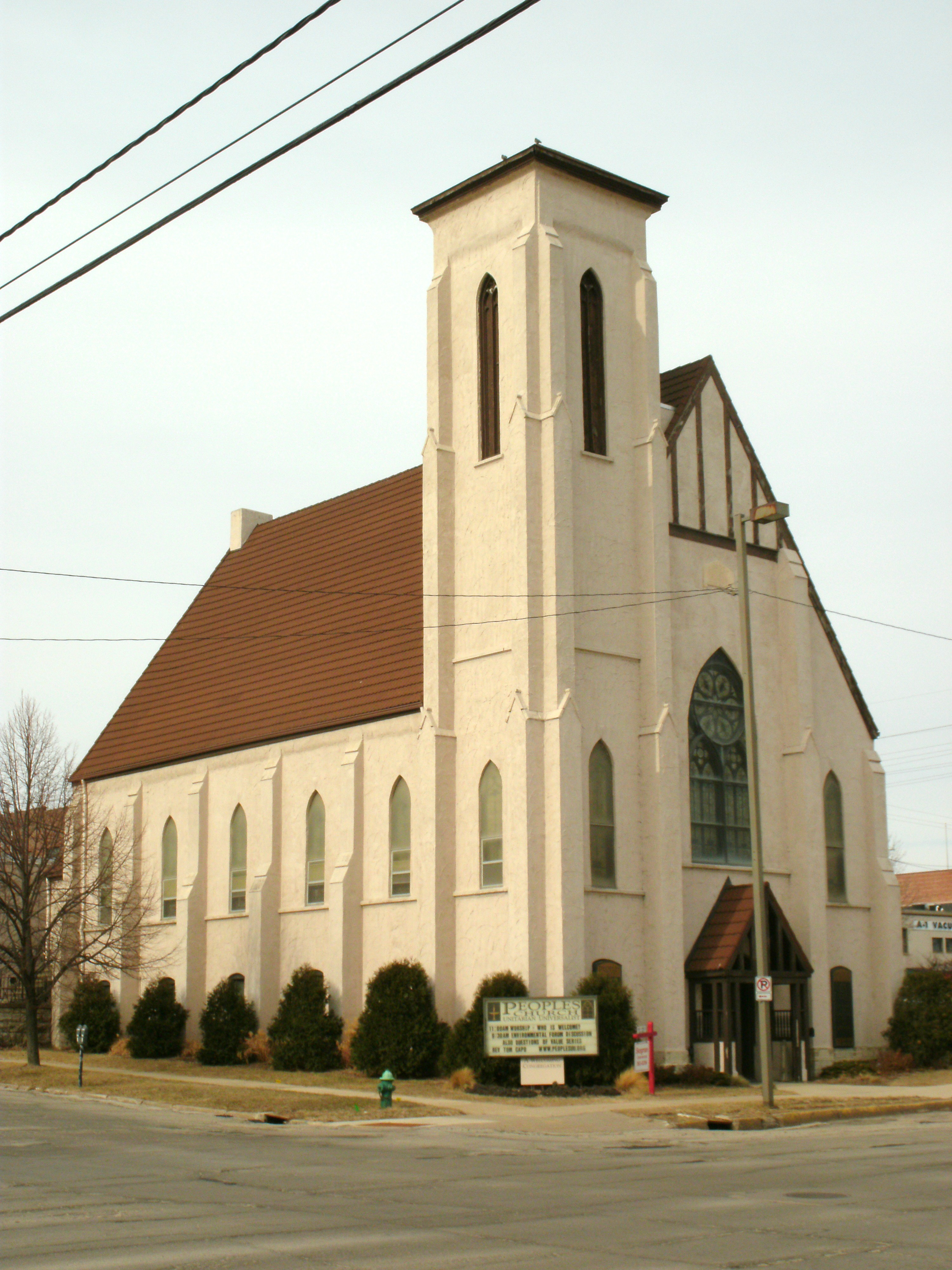

- Location within Iowa Location within the United States
- Location: 600 3rd Ave., SE; Cedar Rapids, Iowa
- Coordinates: 41°58′48″N 91°39′44″W
- Area: less than one acre
- Built: 1875
- Architectural style: Mission/Spanish Revival
- NRHP reference No.: 78001239
- Added to NRHP: August 24, 1978

The First Universalist Church of Cedar Rapids, also called the Peoples Church Unitarian Universalist, is listed on the National Register of Historic Places. Built in 1875, it served the Unitarian Universalist community of Cedar Rapids, Iowa, US, for more than 135 years. Because of the high cost of upkeep and diminishing membership, the congregation voted to sell the building and grounds in May 2010. It was demolished in October 2011.

== See also ==
- Universalist Church (Mitchellville, Iowa), another Universalist Church on the National Register of Historic Places in Iowa.
