= Universalist Unitarian Church of Riverside =

Church building in Riverside, California, US

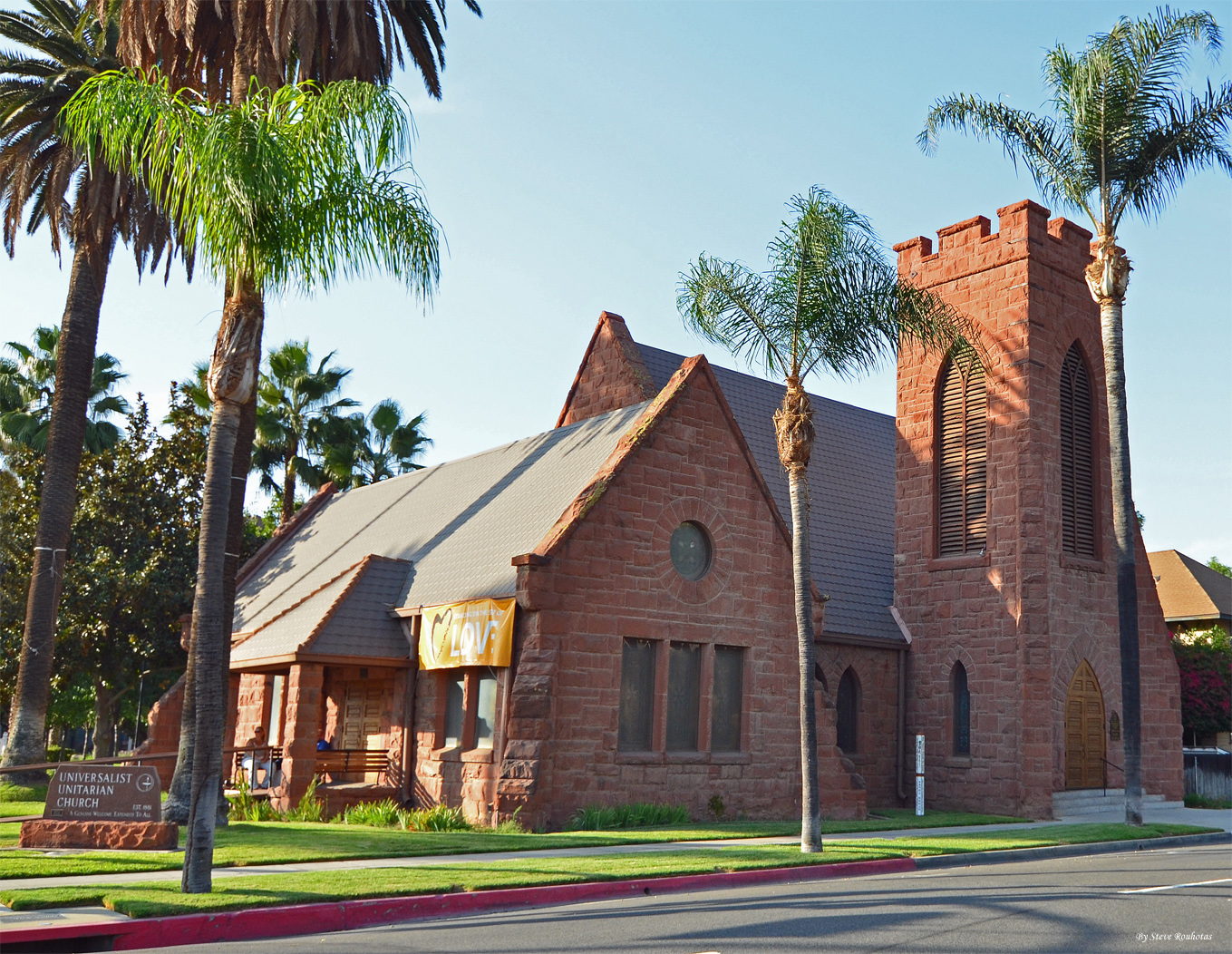

- Location within California Location within the United States

Religion
- Affiliation: Unitarian Universalist
- Leadership: Congregation
- Status: Active

Location
- Location: 3657 Lemon St., Riverside, California
- Interactive map of Universalist Unitarian Church of Riverside
- Coordinates: 33°58′56″N 117°22′17″W

Architecture
- Architect: A.C. Willard
- Style: Norman English Gothic
- Completed: 1891/1892

Specifications
- Height (max): 50 ft
- Materials: Arizona red sandstone
- All Souls Universalist Church
- U.S. National Register of Historic Places
- Riverside Landmark
- Area: less than one acre
- Built by: A.W. Boggs, Richard Girdwood
- NRHP reference No.: 78000736
- RIVL No.: 3
- Added to NRHP: September 18, 1978

Website
- uuchurchofriverside.org

The Universalist Unitarian Church of Riverside, previously known as the All Souls Universalist Church, is a Universalist Unitarian church located in Riverside, California, United States.

It was built during 1891–92. It was listed on the National Register of Historic Places as "All Souls Universalist Church" in 1978. Also it is listed as Riverside city landmark #3.

It is a rare and elegant example, perhaps the only example for its era, of architecture in California using the Permian age Supai sandstone of the Arizona plateau area.
