= All Souls Unitarian-Universalist Church =

Historic church in Ohio, United States

- U.S. National Register of Historic Places
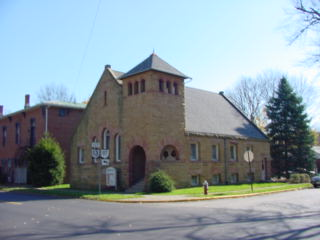
- All Souls Unitarian-Universalist Church

- Location within Ohio Location within the United States
- Location: Bellville, Ohio
- Coordinates: 40°37′11″N 82°30′45″W
- Built: 1894-97
- Architect: D.L. Briggs; et al.
- Architectural style: Richardsonian Romanesque
- NRHP reference No.: 76001520
- Added to NRHP: January 1, 1976

All Souls Unitarian Universalist Church, built in 1894 in the Richardsonian Romanesque style is a historic building located at 25 Church Street in Bellville, Ohio. On January 1, 1976, it was added to the National Register of Historic Places.

== History ==
All Souls held its first services in 1822 using circuit riders. The first meeting house was on the east side of Main Street. Official organization of the church was in 1847 and the first building of Western Reserve Italianate design was constructed near the corner of Church and Bell Streets in 1851.

The current building, a Richardsonian Romanesque style structure, was constructed in 1894–1897. D. L. Briggs of Cleveland was the architect. The sandstone came from the Cyrus Gatton Farm on Ohio Route 97, east of Bellville, and another quarry west of the village. Stones were cut to fit and the cornerstone laid in 1894. Native lumber was used for the rough structure. The fourteen stained glass windows were ordered through an importing firm in Boston and came from Germany. The building was dedicated in 1897.

== Current use ==
All Souls is a member church in good standing of the Unitarian Universalist Association. As of 2019, the church had 64 members.
