= OMD =

OMD may stand for:

== Science ==
- Osteomodulin, extracellular matrix protein
- Organic matter digestibility
- Organic mental disorders
- Orofacial myological disorders, diseases affecting facial muscles
- Oromandibular dystonia, neurological disease
- 3-O-Methyldopa, metabolite and drug
- Occult macular dystrophy, a rare genetic retinal disease

== Entertainment and media ==
- Orchestral Manoeuvres in the Dark (alternately billed as OMD), an English electronic band
- OMD Worldwide, a global media agency network
- Orcs Must Die!, a strategy video game
- Spider-Man: "One More Day", a 2007 four-part Spider-Man comic book crossover storyline

== Religion ==
- Ordo Frati Excalceatorum de B.M.V. de Mercede, the Discalced Mercedarians, Catholic religious order
- Clerics Regular of the Mother of God of Lucca members use the suffix of O.M.D.
- Ohio-Meadville District

== Other uses ==
- Olympus OM-D series of digital cameras
- One Million Degrees, a Chicago educational charity
- Ormond railway station, Melbourne
