= Meadville Lombard Theological School =

Seminary in Chicago, Illinois, United States

- Former names: Meadville Theological School; Lombard College
- Motto: "Changing Lives to Change the World"
- Type: Private, Unitarian Universalist
- Established: 1844 – Meadville Theological School; 1853 – Lombard College; 1930
- Affiliations: Association of Chicago Theological Schools (ACTS), International Association for Religious Freedom (IARF)
- Endowment: $33.1 million (2024)
- President: Elias Ortega-Aponte
- Academic staff: 19
- Administrative staff: 16
- Students: 123
- Postgraduates: 123
- Location: Chicago, Illinois, United States of America; 41.8740°N 87.6247°W
- Campus: Urban
- Website: www.meadville.edu

The Meadville Lombard Theological School is a Unitarian Universalist seminary in Chicago, Illinois.

== History ==
Meadville Lombard is a result of a merger in the 1930s between two institutions, a Unitarian seminary and a Universalist seminary.

Meadville Theological School was founded in 1844 in Meadville, Pennsylvania. Most of the original funding came from Harm Jan Huidekoper, a recent convert to Christian Unitarianism and a wealthy businessman, and from the Independent Congregational Church.

Meadville Theological School moved to Chicago and became affiliated with the University of Chicago in 1926. It began construction on its permanent building in 1929, located across the street from First Unitarian Church of Chicago and designed by the same architect.

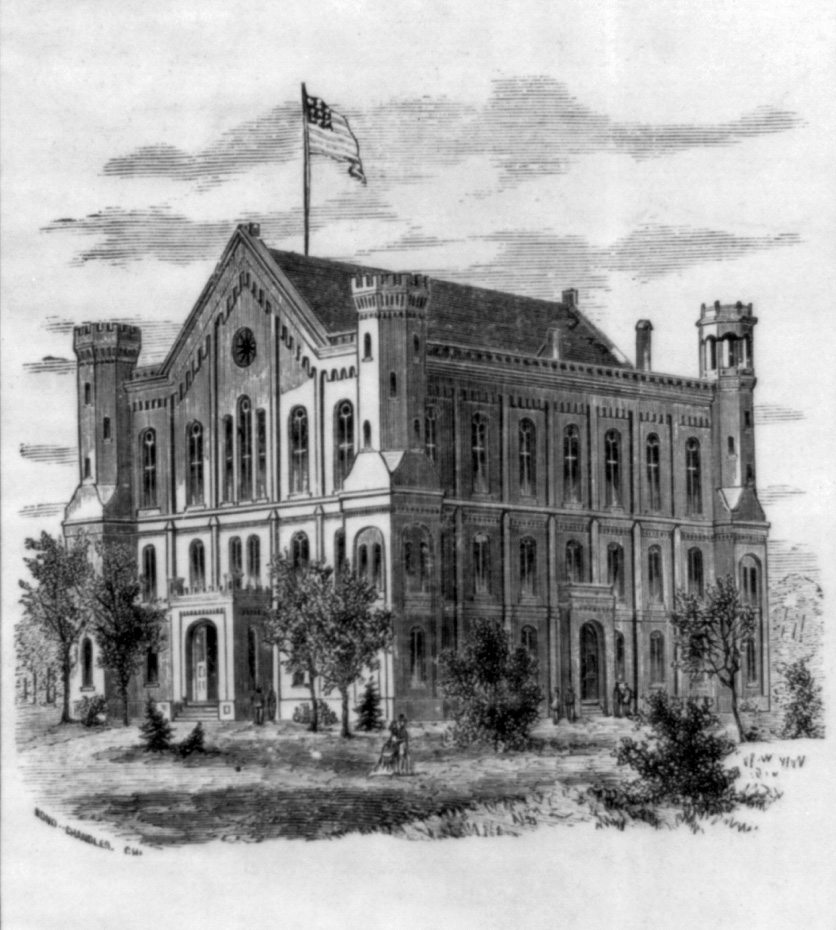
Lombard College building, from an 1876 catalog

Lombard College was a Universalist institution in Galesburg, Illinois, founded in 1853. From the 1880s to 1913 it was the seat of the Ryder School of Divinity. When the college closed in 1930, the Lombard charter was transferred to Meadville Theological School in Chicago. bringing with it Lombard's privilege of a tax exemption, "one of only three in Illinois granting full tax-exempt status in perpetuity for all college-owned property." The combined institution became Meadville Lombard Theological School.

=== 21st century ===
In the first decade of the 2000s, the school implemented cost-cutting measures as its endowment declined in value from $18 million to $12 million, and funding from the Unitarian Universalist Association was reduced.

In 2005 Meadville Lombard held merger talks with the other Unitarian Universalist seminary in the United States, Starr King School for the Ministry, but the schools announced in July 2006 that a merger was not in the best interest of either institution.

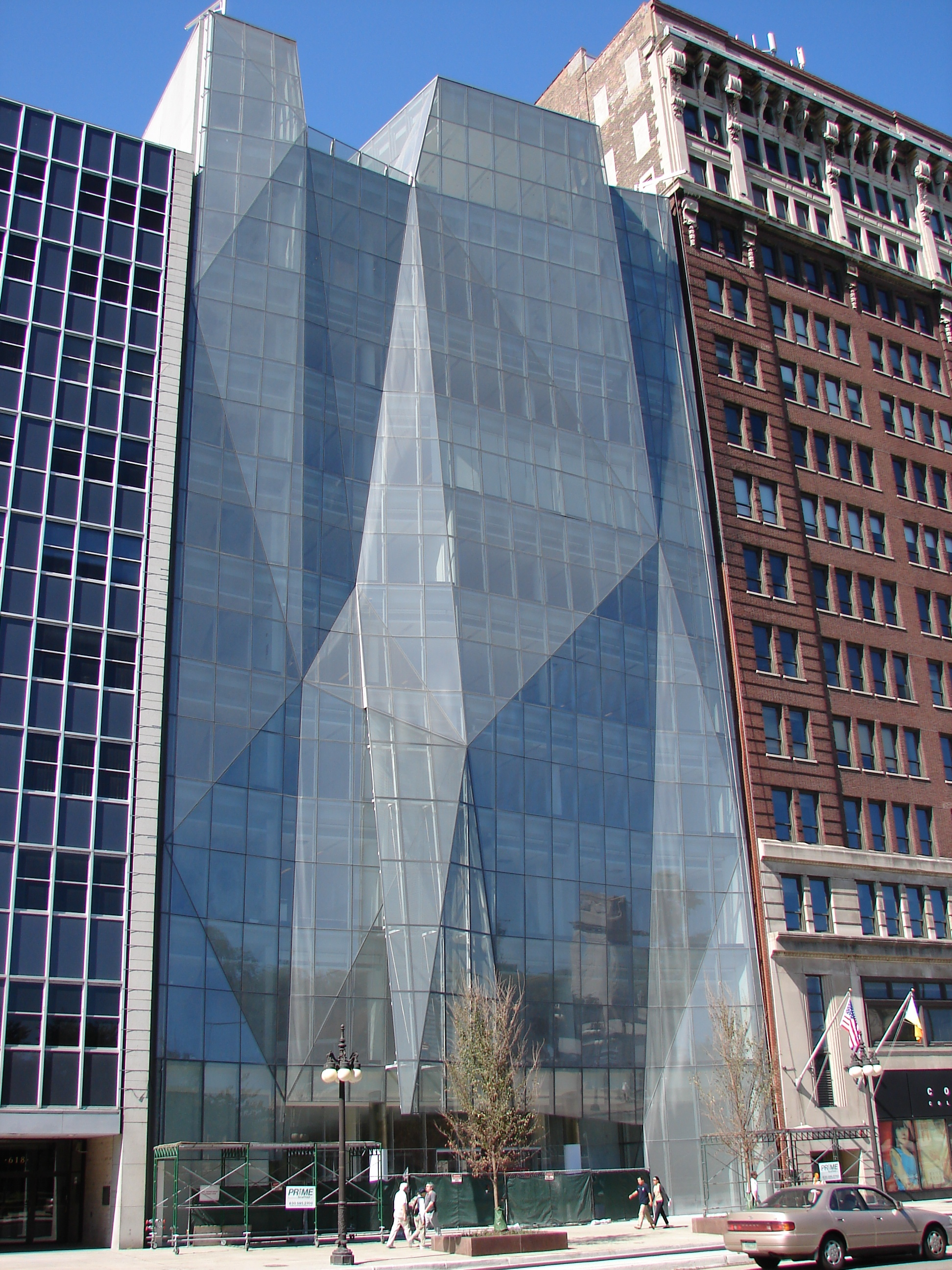
Spertus Institute for Jewish Learning and Leadership

In June 2010, Meadville Lombard and Andover Newton Theological School in Newton, Massachusetts, affiliated with the American Baptist Churches USA and the United Church of Christ, announced plans to create a "new university-style institution" based at Andover Newton's campus with an interfaith model for theological education. Meadville Lombard would have become the Unitarian Universalist college in the new theological university. The two schools, Meadville Lombard and Andover Newton, announced they were seeking additional partners for the proposed institution. The intention was to form the new university as a legal entity by June 15, 2011, but the two institutions withdrew from the plan in April 2011, citing issues related to governance and finances.

In 2011, the seminary's Hyde Park buildings were sold and the school relocated, to the Spertus Institute building on Michigan Avenue in Chicago's South Loop neighborhood.

Over the last decade, changes were made to the school's curriculum to reflect the smaller campus footprint and the increase in online learning options.

== Academics ==
Meadville Lombard Theological School is one of two Unitarian Universalist seminaries (the other being Starr King School for the Ministry in Berkeley, California) and offers the following graduate degree programs: Master of Divinity, Master of Arts in Religion, Master of Arts in Leadership Studies (with the option to add a concentration in Lay Community Ministry), and the Doctor of Ministry.

== Campus ==
The seminary's historic 16,000 sq. ft. Collegiate Gothic style building was erected in 1933 on 5701 S. Woodlawn Avenue, across from First Unitarian Church of Chicago and near the campus of the University of Chicago in Hyde Park.

In 2011 the University of Chicago purchased the building and hired Kliment Halsband Architects to turn it into a home for the Neubauer Family Collegium for Culture and Society.

From 2011 to 2021, Meadville Lombard was located in the South Loop neighborhood of Chicago, sharing space with the Spertus Institute for Jewish Learning and Leadership. The school's current location is more centrally situated in the Loop at 180 North Wabash.

== Notable alumni ==
- The Rev. Blanche Pentecost Bagley British-born American Unitarian minister
- The Rev. Jenkin Lloyd Jones, peace advocate, founder of All Souls Unitarian Church in Chicago; played a prominent role in the growth of the Western Unitarian Convention
- Christian D. Larson, New Thought writer of over 40 books and associate editor of Science of Mind magazine
- The Rev. William F. Schulz, human rights activist, former president of the Unitarian Universalist Association, former executive director of Amnesty International USA
- The Rev. James Henry Wiggin, editor for Mary Baker Eddy
- The Rev. John B. Wolf, senior minister of All Souls Unitarian Church in Tulsa, Oklahoma
- The Most Rev. Gregorio Aglipay, first supreme bishop of the Philippine Independent Church; conferred to an honorary Doctorate of Divinity.
- Albert Levitt, judge of the U.S. District Court of the Virgin Islands
- James Worth, state representative

== Notable faculty ==
- The Rev. James Luther Adams (died 1994), former Professor of Ethics and Theology
- The Rev. William F. Schulz, affiliated faculty
- The Rev. William Sinkford, affiliated faculty
- The Rev. William R. Murry, former President and Academic Dean
