= Sofía Betancourt =

American minister

The Reverend Sofía Betancourt

10th President of the Unitarian Universalist Association
- Incumbent
- Assumed office July 8, 2023
- Preceded by: Susan Frederick-Gray

Personal details
- Domestic partner: Sam Ames
- Education: Cornell University (B.S.); Starr King School for the Ministry (M.Div.); Yale University (Ph.D., M.Phil., M.A.)

Personal life
- Website: UUA President's pages

Religious life
- Denomination: Unitarian Universalist Association
- Profession: Minister

Sofía Betancourt is an American minister and professor who is the tenth president of the Unitarian Universalist Association (UUA). The UUA president is the CEO and religious leader of Unitarian Universalism in the USA. Betancourt is the first woman of color and openly queer person to be elected to the office.

== Education and career ==
Betancourt graduated from Cornell University with a B.S. in Ethnobotany, Starr King School for the Ministry with a M.Div., and Yale University with M.A. and M.Phil. degrees as well as a Ph.D. in Religious Ethics and African American Studies. While completing her M.Div., Betancourt served as intern minister at the UU Church of Berkeley, California. She was ordained in 2004.

Betancourt was senior minister of the First UU Church of Stockton, California; consulting minister at the UU Fellowship of Storrs, Connecticut; and interim minister at the UU Church of Fresno, California.

From 2005 to 2009 she served as director of the UUA’s Office of Racial and Ethnic Concerns, and she has served on numerous appointed and elected UUA committees, including the Appointments Committee, the Nominating Committee, the Cultural Misappropriation Task Force, and the Journey Toward Wholeness Transformation Committee.

From 2009 to 2022 Betancourt worked in academia. She began as a teaching fellow at Yale College and Yale Divinity School from 2009 to 2013. After an interim ministry, she worked as an assistant professor at Starr King in 2016 and served as associate professor and acting president of Starr King from August 2020 to February 2021. In August 2021, she became an associate professor and the interim associate dean for academic affairs at Drew University Theological School. In these positions, she taught courses on ethics and liberation, womanism and Earth justice, Latina feminist theologies, and combating oppression.

In 2017, when the president of the Unitarian Universalist Association resigned a few months before the end of the term amid a call to reckon with the impacts of white supremacy culture on the systems and structures of Unitarian Universalism, the UUA Board appointed Betancourt, Leon Spencer, and William Sinkford as interim co-presidents. Betancourt's focus in that role was as the leader of the Commission on Institutional Change.

Most recently, Betancourt served as a Resident Scholar and Special Advisor on Justice and Equity at the Unitarian Universalist Service Committee.

== Presidency ==
Betancourt was nominated by the UUA Presidential Search Committee in November 2022. The committee unanimously nominated two leaders to be candidates for President. One of those nominees declined the nomination.

Betancourt's campaign centered around three priorities: communal care, collaborative leadership, and "facing the unknown together". Betancourt was elected by 96.6% of delegate votes on June 24, 2023, at the UUA's General Assembly in Pittsburgh, PA. She was installed as president June 25, 2023.

== Publications ==
=== Books by Betancourt ===
- Ecowomanism at the Panamá Canal: Black Women, Labor, and Environmental Ethics (2022)

=== Books with contributions by Betancourt ===
- Centering: Navigating Race, Authenticity, and Power in Ministry (2017)
- Ecowomanism, Religion, and Ecology (2017)
- Justice on Earth: People of Faith Working at the Intersections of Race, Class, and the Environment (2018)
- BLUU Notes: An Anthology of Love, Justice, and Liberation (2021)
