= Susan Frederick-Gray =

9th President of the Unitarian Universalist Association
- Incumbent
- Assumed office June 25, 2017
- Preceded by: Rev. Sofia Betancourt, Rev. William Sinkford, and Dr. Leon Spencer (interim co-presidents)
- Succeeded by: Rev. Sofia Betancourt

Personal details
- Spouse: Rev. Brian Frederick-Gray
- Children: Henry
- Education: University of Wisconsin-Madison B.S. Harvard Divinity School M.Div
- Website: UUA President's pages

Susan Frederick-Gray is a Unitarian Universalist minister who served as the ninth president of the Unitarian Universalist Association from 2017 to 2023. She was the first woman to be elected to the office.

== Education and career ==
Frederick-Gray graduated from the University of Wisconsin, Madison in 1997 with a bachelor's in molecular biology and received a Master of Divinity in 2001 from Harvard Divinity School. During seminary, she served as a Student Minister in Religious Education at the Winchester Unitarian Society, then interned at the First UU Church of Nashville. She served as minister of the First Unitarian Universalist Church of Youngstown, Ohio from 2003 to 2008, and as lead minister of the Unitarian Universalist Congregation of Phoenix from 2008 to 2017. As the latter congregation's lead minister, she led organization for the Arizona Immigration Ministry and hosted the UUA's 2012 "Justice GA" in Phoenix.

== Presidency ==
Frederick-Gray was nominated by petition to run for president in 2016. Her campaign centered around three themes: "spiritually vital, grounded in relationships, organized for impact." Following the resignation of UUA president Rev. Peter Morales, candidate Frederick-Gray worked with the three interim co-presidents and the two other presidential candidates, the Revs. Alison Miller and Jeanne Pupke, to ensure new hiring practice policies would last.

On June 24, 2017, Frederick-Gray was elected President at the UUA's General Assembly in New Orleans. In the UUA's first entirely electronic instant-runoff presidential election, Frederick-Gray received 39.7% of delegates' first-choice ballots, then 58.3% of the second-choice ballots from voters for the eliminated Rev. Alison Miller. She won in the second round with an overall 56% of the vote.

During her first month in office, Frederick-Gray nominated acting Chief Operating Officer Carey McDonald and condemned U.S. President Donald Trump's ban on transgender people from military service.
