= William R. Murry =

American humanist

William "Bill" Russell Murry (June 19, 1932 – July 6, 2017) was an American humanist, author, Unitarian Universalist minister, and former President of Meadville Lombard Theological School.

== Early life and career ==
William Russell Murry was born in Jefferson City, MO, on June 19, 1932. He had two sisters, Jane King and Ettus Hiatt. He was raised in the Southern Baptist Christian tradition. He received a Bachelor of Arts from Oklahoma Baptist University in 1954, a Master of Divinity from Yale University in 1957, and a PhD in Theology and Culture from Drew University in 1970. Bill began his career as a Baptist pastor in Shelton, CT, following which he accepted a joint appointment as University Minister at the Riverside Church and as Campus Minister at Columbia University in New York City. In 1964 he married Barbara Wesp, with whom he had three sons: Brian, Jonathan, and Christopher.

In 1977, Murry became a Unitarian Universalist, following his gradual transition away from theism. He became a minister at the UU congregation of Bloomington, IN. There, he served on the board of Planned Parenthood and helped start the city's hospice. In 1980, he became the minister at the River Road congregation in Bethesda, MD, where he remained for 17 years and was later made Minister Emeritus. While in Bethesda, he co-founded the Montgomery Housing Partnership and Unitarian Universalist Affordable Housing Corporation.

From 1997 to 2004, Murry became president and Academic Dean of Meadville Lombard Theological School in Chicago, IL. In affiliation with the Unitarian Universalist Association, Murry was chair of the planning committee of the National Social Justice Workshop for three years, a District Ministerial Settlement Representative for six years, and President of the Chesapeake chapter of the Unitarian Universalist Minister's Association.

After his retirement, he was honored with the UU Retired Ministers and Partners Association's first "Creative Sage-ing" Award. In 2017, the UU Humanist Association honored him as the first recipient of its Lifetime Achievement Award.

== Published works ==
- A Faith for All Seasons: Liberal Religion and the Crises of Life (River Road Press, 1990)
- Reason and Reverence: Religious Humanism for the 21st Century (Skinner House Books, 2007)
- Becoming More Fully Human: Religious Humanism as a Way of Life (Religious Humanism Press, 2013)
- Humanist Voices in Unitarian Universalism co-edited with Kendyl Gibbons (Skinner House Books, 2016)
