= Rebecca Ann Parker =

American theologian

6th President of Starr King School for the Ministry

Personal details
- Spouse(s): Rev. Joanne M. Braxton, Ph.D.
- Education: University of Puget Sound, Claremont School of Theology, Northwest Theological Union

Rebecca Ann Parker (born 1953) is an American theologian, author, and former President of Starr King School for the Ministry, the first woman to serve as the permanent head of an accredited U.S. theological school.

== Education and career ==
Rev. Dr. Rebecca Parker is the daughter and granddaughter of progressive, intellectual women and liberal, Social Gospel clergymen. Parker is a descendant of settlers in French Canada and Alaska. Her parents were anti-war and Civil Rights activists.

Parker studied cello performance at the University of Washington and the University of Puget Sound. For many years, she performed and toured regularly with Orchestra Seattle and later with the Rose Trio. Parker received a bachelor's degree from the University of Puget Sound in 1975, a Doctorate of Ministry from Claremont School of Theology in 1979, and an honorary Doctorate of Divinity from Northwest Theological Union. Her doctoral studies focused on Alfred North Whitehead's theory of consciousness as a basis for a spirituality that integrates aesthetics and social engagement.

She was ordained a United Methodist minister in 1992 and holds dual fellowship with the Unitarian Universalist Association. She has worked in United Methodist and Unitarian Universalist congregations, including All Souls Unitarian in Washington, D.C., and Wallingford United Methodist Church in Seattle, which was a pioneer in the Reconciling Congregation movement, affirming the sacred worth of all LGBTQ people. She served as President of Starr King School for the Ministry from 1990 to 2014 and is now a Professor of Theology Emerita. She has worked as the Theologian In-Residence and Minister for Adult Spiritual Development at All Souls Church in Washington, DC.

Parker has written numerous sermons, speeches, magazine articles, and poetry as well as several theological books published by Beacon Press and Skinner House.

Dr. Parker became a founding board member of The Braxton Institute for Sustainability, Resiliency and Joy in 2012. She lives in Puget Sound and Washington, D.C., with her spouse, Rev. Joanne M Braxton, Ph.D., another founder of The Braxton Institute.

== Published works ==
- A House for Hope: The Promise of Progressive Religion for the 21st Century, co-authored with John Buehrens (Beacon, 2010)
- Blessing the World: What Can Save Us Now, collected essays edited by Robert Hardies (Skinner, 2006)
- Saving Paradise: How Christianity Traded Love of This World for Crucifixion and Empire, co-authored with Rita Nakashima Brock (Beacon, 2009)
- Proverbs of Ashes: Redemptive Violence and the Search for What Saves Us, co-authored with Rita Nakashima Brock (Beacon, 2002)
