= Peter Morales =

The Reverend Peter Morales

8th President of the Unitarian Universalist Association
- In office June 28, 2009 – April 1, 2017
- Preceded by: William G. Sinkford
- Succeeded by: Rev. Sofia Betancourt, Rev. William Sinkford, and Dr. Leon Spencer (interim co-presidents)

Personal details
- Born: San Antonio, Texas, U.S.
- Website: UUA President's pages

Peter Morales is an American former president of the Unitarian Universalist Association (2009 to 2017). Morales was the UUA's first Latino president. In the early 2000s, he was the senior minister of the Jefferson Unitarian Church in Jefferson County, Colorado, a rapidly growing Unitarian Universalist congregation in the northwestern Denver-Aurora Metropolitan Area. He also worked for the UUA from 2002 to 2004. In 2008, he announced his candidacy for president, and in 2009 he was elected. As the result of a controversy regarding the UUA's hiring practices and charges of institutional racism, Morales resigned as president in 2017, three months before the end of the term.

== Personal history ==
Morales was born in San Antonio, Texas. His mother, Oralia López, was of Mexican-American heritage; his father, Peter Morales, was an immigrant from Spain. His initial language was Spanish. As a youth, he greatly enjoyed baseball. As a young child, he attended a bilingual Lutheran mission church, which his mother had attended growing up. When Morales was ten, his family later moved to a larger, English speaking congregation. He attended Sunday school and was confirmed there, while learning what he called "fundamentalist doctrine."

On graduation from high school, he attended Raymond College at the University of the Pacific in Stockton, California. Active in student government, he studied history and social theory. It was also in college, when learning about "evolution and cultural anthropology and comparative religion," that he ceased to belief in his childhood faith, and left his Lutheran denomination.

Upon graduation in 1967, he married his wife Phyllis and taught school for three years. Faced with the draft during the Vietnam War, he immigrated to Revelstoke, British Columbia. There he worked in a lumber mill and as a reporter for a community newspaper. No longer in danger from the draft, he returned to the United States when he was 26 and entered a program in American Studies at the University of Kansas. Following a summer in Mexico, studying Spanish, Morales was granted a lectureship in 1976 as a Fulbright lecturer in American literature and American history at the University of Oviedo in Asturias, in northern Spain.

However, while in Spain, his son (born in Canada and then four years old) was diagnosed with cancer, necessitating a return to the United States, where the son was treated at the University of California San Francisco Medical Center. Faced with daunting medical bills, Morales accepted a job in 1977 working for the California Department of Social Services in Sacramento where his second child, a daughter, was born. He worked there until 1985 on tasks related to the Aid to Families with Dependent Children program.

In 1985, Morales ventured into newspaper publishing as the owner of community newspapers in Rogue River and Cottage Grove, Oregon, being a pioneer in the use of desktop publishing. As an experienced and innovative journalist, in 1995 he was awarded one of the first Knight International Journalism Fellowships and spent 5 months teaching and advising at La Industria de Chiclayo in Chiclayo, Peru.

== Unitarian Universalism ==
Morales first became involved in Unitarian Universalism at the Unitarian Universalist Church of Eugene, Oregon. Very active, he served on the congregation's board of trustees. He enrolled in Starr King School for the Ministry, a Unitarian Universalist seminary in Berkeley, California and on graduation in 1999 was called to the Jefferson Unitarian Church in Golden, Colorado. Active in liberal evangelism while still in seminary, under his leadership the Jefferson Unitarian Church grew rapidly. The leadership of the Unitarian Universalist Association in 2002 asked him to serve as Director of District Services for two years, returning to Jefferson Unitarian Church in 2004. In 2008, in an address to his congregation, he announced his candidacy for the presidency of the Unitarian Universalist Association on a platform of inclusion and growth.

=== Presidency of the Unitarian Universalist Association ===
On June 27, 2009, Morales was elected president of the Unitarian Universalist Association at the General Assembly of the Association in Salt Lake City, Utah. Morales received 2,061 votes from delegates to 1,481 for his opponent, Dr. Laurel Hallman.

Two themes defined the Morales presidency, 2009-2017: collaboration and innovation. These were the driving forces behind the accomplishments of his administration. Within the UUA, Morales restructured staff groups for more efficiency, effectiveness, and outreach. Beyond the UUA, Morales formed deeper partnerships with other Unitarian Universalist organizations, such as the UU Service Committee, to form the UU College of Social Justice. He also partnered with the Unitarian Universalist Ministers Association to create an entrepreneurial ministry program following the creation of an interfaith pilot program with leading business schools. Morales was a staunch supporter of multifaith collaboration. Morales sought to position the UUA as a convener for multifaith collaboration, most notably with the United Church of Christ, the Union for Reform Judaism, and the NAACP. Morales was unrelenting in his efforts to increase Unitarian Universalist presence and involvement on issues such as marriage equality, racial justice, immigration, and climate change. He was arrested twice for his convictions. Seeing moral issues as global issues, Morales engaged in, and promoted, international relationships and efforts for equality in many parts of the world including: Japan, India, Guatemala, Mexico, and Africa.

In March 2017, a controversy broke out regarding the UUA's hiring practices as they pertained to institutional racism. Charges spread on social media that the leaders had chosen a white man over a qualified woman of color. In a letter to staff addressing the controversy, Morales called for “more humility and less self righteousness, more thoughtfulness and less hysteria.” Later he realized that the letter “made matters worse” and that he had “clearly lost the trust of many people.” On March 30, 2017, Morales announced he would resign as UUA president, effective two days later. His term had only three months left.

== Writings ==
- Columns in UU World Magazine
- News, Press Releases, UU World and International posts
- Articles in HuffPost
