= Districts of the Unitarian Universalist Association =

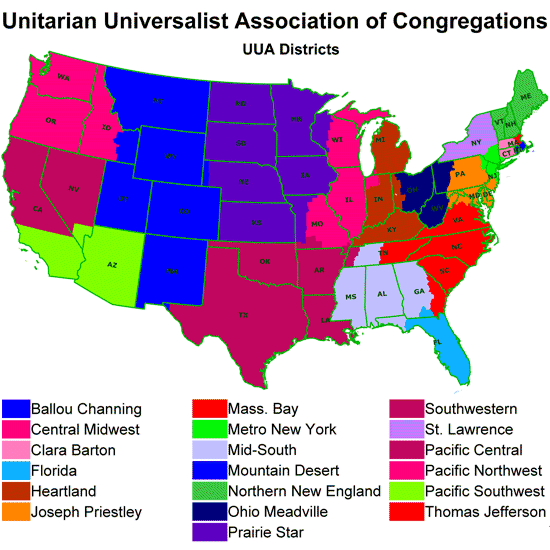
A map of all 19 UUA districts.

The Unitarian Universalist Association, an association of Unitarian Universalist Congregations in the United States of America, is composed of 19 Districts.

== Structure ==
Each District has its own District-level organization, complete with governing body (in the form of an elected council, or board). Districts provide services to their member congregations, including help with ministerial settlement. Each District has a representative on the UUA's Board of Trustees. Collaborations between districts have also resulted in the creation of five unofficial "regions": the Central East Regional Group, the Southern Region, MidAmerica Region, Pacific Western Region and New England Region. Multi-congregational collaboration within districts has also resulted in the creation of unofficial local "clusters" or "networks" (similar to deaneries in episcopal polities) within metropolitan areas with closely approximate churches. Districts also hold annual district assemblies similar to the General Assembly, in which workshops and district business is performed.

== District list ==
- NOTE: Until 2008, there were 20 Districts; the Northeast and New Hampshire-Vermont Districts merged to become the Northern New England District. A prior merger occurred in 2000, when the Unitarian Universalist District of Michigan (UUDOM) merged with the Ohio Valley Unitarian Universalist District (OVUUD) to become the Heartland District.

=== Central East Regional Group ===
- The Metro New York District comprises 51 congregations in New York state from Long Island to Kingston, including metropolitan New York City, as well as northern New Jersey, southwestern Connecticut, and two congregations in Pennsylvania.
- The Ohio-Meadville District comprises 46 congregations in most of Ohio, western Pennsylvania, southwestern New York, and West Virginia; 28 are listed as Welcoming Congregations.
- The Joseph Priestley District comprises Eastern Pennsylvania, Southern New Jersey, Delaware, Northern Virginia, Maryland, and Washington D.C. It is named after Joseph Priestley, a scientist credited both with the discovery of oxygen and with helping to found the oldest Unitarian congregation in America, the First Unitarian Church of Philadelphia, in 1796; it currently presides over 67 congregations.
- The St. Lawrence District comprises 36 congregations in New York state, excepting New York City.

=== Southern Region ===
- The Florida District comprises most of Florida and one congregation in Valdosta, Georgia; it presides over 45 affiliated and one emerging congregation.
- The Mid-South District comprises 32 UUA-affiliated congregations, and 4 emerging new congregations, in Alabama, the panhandle of Florida, central and north Georgia, Mississippi, and middle Tennessee.
- The Southeast District comprises 72 congregations in North Carolina, South Carolina, Eastern Georgia, Eastern and Central Tennessee, and most of Virginia. It was formerly named the Thomas Jefferson District, after the author of the United States Declaration of Independence and third President of the United States.
- The Southwest District comprises 94 congregations in Texas, Louisiana, Oklahoma, Arkansas, along with parts of Tennessee and Missouri. A congregation in San Miguel de Allende, Guanajuato, Mexico, also falls under its jurisdiction.

=== MidAmerica Region ===
- The Central Midwest District comprises Illinois, northwest Indiana, Michigan, Missouri, and Wisconsin. It presides over 80 congregations.
- The Heartland District comprises Michigan, most of Indiana, Kentucky, and a small part of Ohio; it presides over 54 member congregations.
- The Prairie Star District comprises 70 congregations in Iowa, Kansas, Minnesota, northwestern Missouri, eastern Nebraska, North Dakota, eastern South Dakota, and western Wisconsin.

=== Pacific Western Region ===
- The Pacific Central District comprises 38 congregations in Northern California, Hawaii, and Northern Nevada.
- The Pacific Northwest District comprises 59 member congregations in Alaska, Idaho, Oregon, and Washington.
- The Pacific Southwest District comprises 55 congregations in Arizona, Southern California, and southern Nevada.
- The Mountain Desert District comprises 50 congregations in Colorado, eastern Idaho, Montana, western Nebraska, New Mexico, western Texas, Utah, and Wyoming.

=== New England Region ===
- The Ballou Channing District comprises Rhode Island and Southeastern Massachusetts. Named after Universalist clergyman Hosea Ballou and Unitarian clergyman William Ellery Channing, it presides over 45 congregations.
- The Clara Barton District comprises the Connecticut Valley and Central Massachusetts. It is named after Clara Barton, a pioneer American teacher, nurse, and humanitarian, remembered for organizing the American Red Cross; it currently presides over 64 member and one emerging congregations.
- The Massachusetts Bay District comprises 55 congregations in the Greater Boston area.
- The Northern New England District comprises 73 congregations in New Hampshire, Vermont, and Maine.
