= Spirit of Life =

"Spirit of Life", number 123 in the Unitarian Universalist (UU) hymnal Singing the Living Tradition, is "by far the most commonly sung UU song" (excepting children's recessionals). It was written by Carolyn McDade in 1981. "An outsider examining UU worship practices would almost certainly regard 'Spirit of Life' as the standard UU anthem." It has been used to represent Unitarian Universalism in interfaith contexts, such as the 1993 centennial celebration of the Parliament of World Religions.

Raised Southern Baptist, McDade joined the Unitarian Church of Austin, Texas, in the 1950s, and was active at the Arlington Street Church in Boston in the 1960s. She has been involved in Unitarian Universalist ministry but today she self-identifies as non-denominational woman of faith; her community is a loose community of women.
