= Blanche Pentecost Bagley =

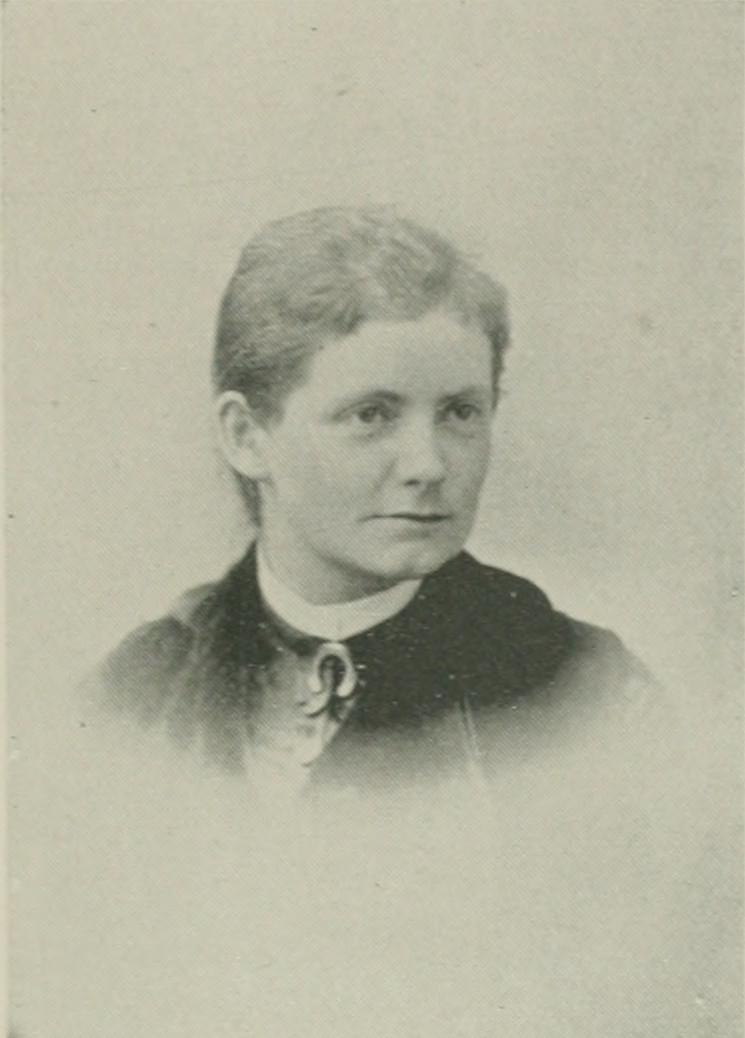
Portrait from A Woman of the Century

Blanche Pentecost Bagley (January 19, 1858 – August 14, 1928) was a British-born American Unitarian minister. She and her husband were ordained and installed together as joint pastors in a pulpit in South Dakota in 1889, the ceremony being the first of that kind in history. Bagley sang, played the piano, painted, and was interested in temperance, equal suffrage, and other public movements.

== Early life and education ==
Alice Isabel Blanche Pentecost was born in Torquay, England, January 19, 1858. (Note: According to Familysearch.org, Blanche was born in 1852.) Her father was the Rev. Richard Ingram Pentecost (1822-1914), a Unitarian minister, who relocated to Salem, Massachusetts. Her mother was Agnes Towry (née, Ashbee; 1824–1894). There were several younger siblings including Brenda, Agnes, Richard, Robert, Douglas, Edith, Spencer, Stanley, and Septimus. Three brothers became architects.

Pentecost received her early education partly in private schools in London, England, where her family then resided, and partly in a French college in Avenches, Canton Vaud, Switzerland, from which she was graduated.

In 1882, the family came to the U.S. and made their home in Chicago.

Pentecost, like the rest of her family, was brought up in the Established Church of England, but she became a Unitarian while visiting a sister, whose husband, the Rev. Frederick Blount Mott, was then studying for the Unitarian ministry. By them, she was induced to enter the Meadville Lombard Theological School, from which institution she was graduated in 1889. Two years prior, her first experience of preaching, outside of the college chapel, was in Vermont, in the little town of Middlesex, where she spent the summer of 1887. She had first met her future husband, the Rev. James E. Bagley (1868-1899), in Meadville, where they had entered and left school together.

== Career ==
After her graduation, she took up work as a minister in Reedsburg, Wisconsin.

After Blanche and James married, on September 4, 1889, she accompanied her husband to All Souls Church, Sioux Falls, South Dakota, to which he had received a call. The couple were ordained and installed together there as joint pastors on 17 November of that year, (Note: According to the Argus-Leader (October 18, 1889), Blanche and James were ordained together on October 17, and James was installed as pastor of the church.) the ceremony being the first of that kind in history. It was a returning to the New Testament custom of sending the disciples out two by two.

During their residence in South Dakota, Bagley took an active interest in all public issues and moral reforms in that State. She usually conducted the evening services in the church and occasionally assisted in the morning service. She was also assistant superintendent of the Sunday school, chair of the executive board of the Unity Club a literary organization, a charter member of the board of directors of the Woman's Benevolent Association, a member of the Minister's Association, and with her husband, joint chair of the executive committer of the Equal Suffrage Association. She was a member of the Woman's Relief Corps, of which, a short time before she left the city, she became chaplain. While in Sioux Falls, she made the acquaintance of Susan B. Anthony, and the Rev. Anna Howard Shaw, and had the honor of introducing both of these speakers to Sioux Falls audiences. During the first year of her married life, she took part in the ordination of two other woman ministers, the Rev. Helene Putnam and the Rev. Lila Frost Sprague, both of whom had been college friends.

Later, she made her home in Haverhill, Massachusetts, where her husband, in 1890, was installed pastor of the First Parish Church. Mrs. Bagley occasionally filled her husband's pulpit and conducted the afternoon service at a little church in the outskirts of the city. From 1893 until his death in 1899, Mr. Bagley served as the pastor of the stone church on Beal Street, Wollaston, Massachusetts. In August 1894, the first number of the Angelus, a four-page monthly paper published in the interests of the Wollaston Unitarian society was issued with seven joint editors, including Mr. and Mrs. Bagley.

She was also local superintendent of the department of scientific temperance instruction in connection with the Woman's Christian Temperance Union (W.C.T.U.).

In 1901, she was living at the Villa Le Bosquet, Dinard Street, Enggat, Bretagne, France. In 1906, she was living in Dijon, France, and in 1920, she was living in Toronto, Canada.

== Personal life ==
The couple had two children, Marion and James.

Bagley was an accomplished pianist and had an inherited gift for painting. She had an unusually strong, clear contralto voice, with a distinct articulation, which made it easy for her to be heard by the largest audiences.

Blanche Pentecost Bagley died 14 August 1928.
