= Ohio-Meadville District =

District of the Unitarian Universalist Association

The Ohio-Meadville District is a district of the Unitarian Universalist Association. It comprises 46 congregations in most of Ohio, western Pennsylvania, southwestern New York, and West Virginia; 28 are listed as Welcoming Congregations.

It covers the following clusters:

- Pittsburgh Cluster (Pittsburgh and southwestern PA)
- Northwest PA/NY Cluster (northwest Pennsylvania and southwest New York)
- Cleveland Cluster (greater Cleveland area)
- Northwest Ohio Cluster (northwest Ohio, primarily the area around Toledo)
- WACKY Cluster (mid to eastern Ohio, between Columbus and Cleveland)
- Central OH Cluster (central part of Ohio around Columbus)
- Southern Cluster (West Virginia and southeast Ohio)
