= John B. Wolf (pastor) =

American Unitarian Universalist pastor

- Born: John Burton Wolf; September 6, 1925; Bloomington, Illinois
- Died: September 19, 2017 (aged 92); Tulsa, Oklahoma
- Occupation: Unitarian Universalist Minister
- Years active: 1952-1995
- Notable work: Led All Souls church to become the largest Unitarian Universalist church in the United States

John Burton Wolf (1925–2017), more often written as John Wolf or John B. Wolf, was senior minister of the All Souls Unitarian Church in Tulsa, Oklahoma from 1960 until he became Pastor Emeritus in 1995 at the age of 70. He remained affiliated in emeritus status with All Souls until his death in September 2017. He was born in Bloomington, Illinois on September 6, 1925, to Walter and Helen (nee Young) Wolf and was raised there until he joined the U.S. Navy in World War II. (Note: He served as a signalman in the South Pacific. During the Korean War, he rejoined the military, and was commissioned as a Navy reserve chaplain.) He earned Bachelor's degrees from Illinois Wesleyan University and the Federated Theological Faculty of the University of Chicago (now University of Chicago Divinity School). (Note: The degree from IWU was in pre-medicine in 1949; and the degree from University of Chicago was a Bachelor of Science in Divinity in 1952. In 1976, he was awarded the honorary Doctor of Divinity degree by the Meadville Lombard Theological School.)

== Ministerial career ==
Early in his career, Wolf served as the minister for Unitarian churches in Racine, Wisconsin and Meadville, Pennsylvania. (Note: He served at Church of the Good Shepherd Universalist (now Olympia Brown Memorial UU) Church in Racine, WI in 1952, where Dr. Wolf was ordained on February 19, 1953.) His Meadville church was the Independent Congregational Church – Unitarian (now the UU Church of Meadville) from 1954 until 1960. He also served in several positions of the Unitarian Universalist (UU) denomination. In 1960, he was called to serve as Senior Minister of All Souls church in Tulsa. While he served in the latter position, he became a leader of the civil rights movement in Tulsa, and his congregation grew from about 1,000 members in 1960 to about 2,800 by 1968, becoming the largest single UU church in the United States. He also helped stimulate the formation of two more churches in the city: Hope UU Church (in 1969) and Church of the Restoration (in 1988).

Wolf's own church has had to contend with its own tarnished past in race relations. In 1921, the same year as the infamous Tulsa Race Riot, All Souls church was co-founded by Richard Lloyd Jones, editor and publisher of the afternoon newspaper, the Tulsa Tribune. An inflammatory editorial allegedly appeared in the paper reporting an attempted assault of a young white woman by a young black man in the elevator of a downtown building on May 31, 1921. The Tribune article was said to have called for lynching of the man, who had been arrested by the Tulsa County sheriff. When the sheriff refused to turn the prisoner over to an armed mob that night, the frustrated mob members took out their rage on the main residential district of blacks living in Tulsa, burning, looting and killing indiscriminately. White civil and political leaders did nearly nothing to stop the riot until the district was essentially destroyed. Later, the alleged female victim changed her account, the alleged attacker was freed and released for lack of evidence, no one was tried for participating, newspapers of the day disappeared from newsstands (and even libraries) and a veritable "cone of silence" descended over the event for nearly four decades.

Wolf recalled later that he was cautioned by a member of his church that he should never talk about the riot from his pulpit when he began to expound on race relations. John Wolf was not a person to back down from such a controversy. He knew that continued silence would never heal the city, which had experienced significant damage – even when many of the physical scars had been erased. He demanded action through sermons and actions.

By the late 1960s, Wolf had become a spokesman of the city in the eyes of the public and many of his colleagues in the clergy. In 1968, the Tulsa Public School system was floundering on many issues, including integration, and top-heavy management (too many administrators overseeing too few actual teachers). Wolf became fed up and blamed the mess on the board president, Dr. Charles C. Mason. Finally Wolf preached a sermon titled, "The Last Days of Dr. Mason." The Tulsa World published excerpts in its edition on the following morning. That night the school board held its regular public meeting, which had the largest number of people that had ever come to the school board meeting up to that time. Dr. Wolf was present and acted as the public spokesperson. Before the meeting ended, Dr. Mason publicly resigned his position.

Dr. Wolf retired in 1995 as senior minister of All Souls, though he continued to live in Tulsa and remained affiliated with the church as minister emeritus until his death 22 years later.

== Activities outside the church ==
In addition to his pastoral responsibilities, Dr. Wolf gave generously of his time and energies to groups outside the church. Some of these activities included:

- Co-founded the Oklahoma branch of the American Civil Liberties Union;
- Served on the National Board of Planned Parenthood;

== Family ==
According to one obituary, John Wolf was survived by his wife of 65 years, Barbara N. Hudgins Wolf; their son, John David Wolf (married to Anita Jacobson Wolf); their daughter, Catherine Elizabeth Wolf; grandson, Aaron Michael Wolf-Johnson (Kayla Wolf-Johnson), and great-granddaughter Willow Rose Wolf-Johnson.
