= William G. Sinkford =

The Reverend William G. Sinkford
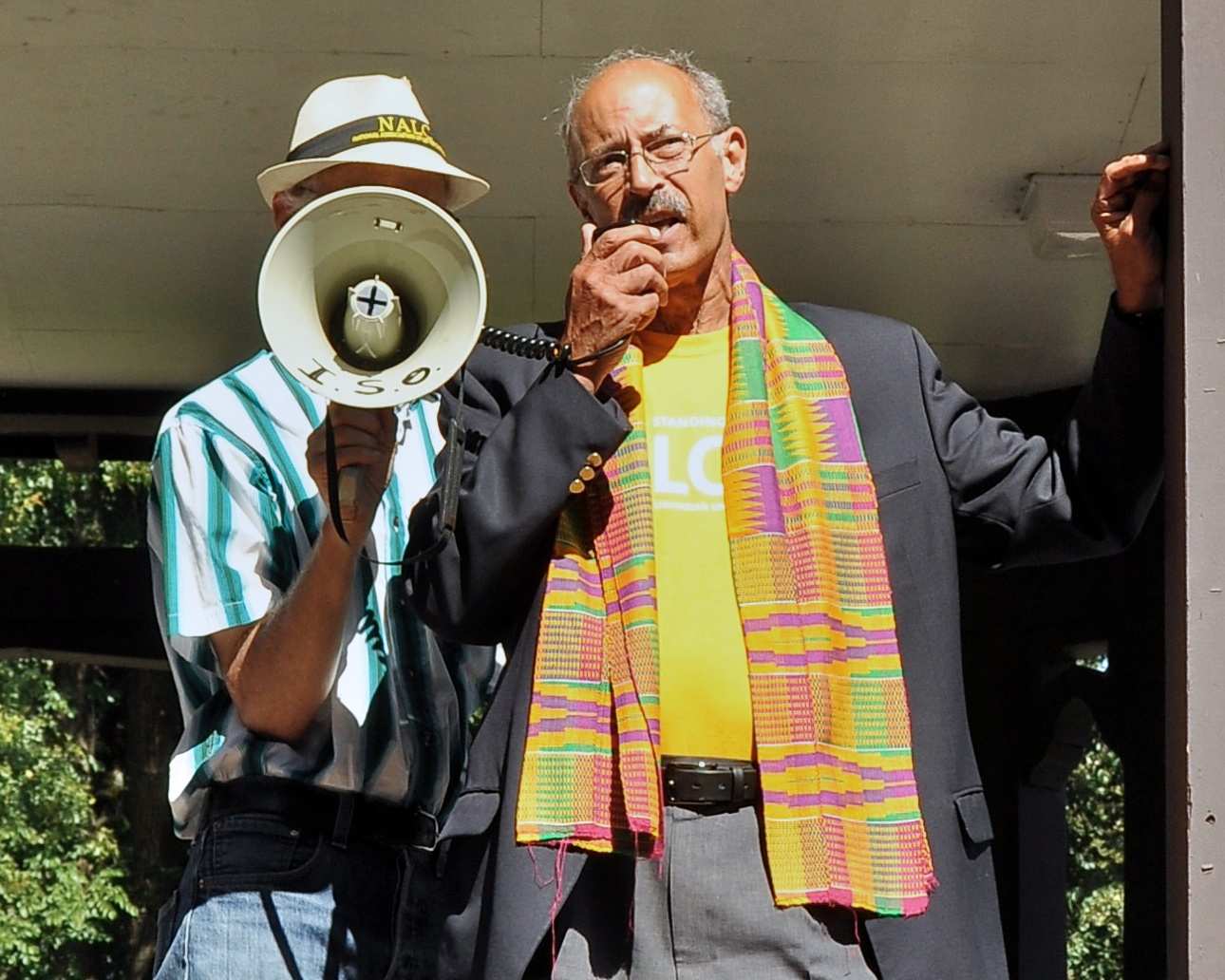

Interim Co-President of the Unitarian Universalist Association
- In office April 10, 2017 – June 25, 2017 Serving with the Rev. Sofía Betancourt and Dr. Leon Spencer
- Preceded by: Rev. Peter Morales
- Succeeded by: Rev. Susan Frederick-Gray

7th President of the Unitarian Universalist Association
- In office June 24, 2001 – June 28, 2009
- Preceded by: Rev. John A. Buehrens
- Succeeded by: Rev. Peter Morales

Personal details
- Born: 1946 San Francisco, California, U.S.
- Spouse: Maria
- Children: 2
- Occupation: Senior minister, First Unitarian Church of Portland (2010–present)

Religious life
- Religion: Unitarian Universalism
- Denomination: Unitarian Universalist Association
- Profession: Minister

The Rev. William G. Sinkford (born 1946) is a Unitarian Universalist minister who served as the seventh president of the Unitarian Universalist Association of Congregations (UUA), from 2001 to 2009. His installation as UUA president made him the first African American to lead that organization, or any traditionally white religious denomination in the United States.

Mr. Sinkford, spent his childhood in Cincinnati and became a Unitarian-Universalist when he was 14 years old. He wrote, "I claimed the church when as a young black man, I walked into First Unitarian, Cincinnati, and found a religious community where I could be fully myself." Though he left in the 1970s believing that the Universalists had retreated from engagement with racial justice. He returned to find a religious home for his two children. He was ordained in 1995. In April 2017, Sinkford was appointed interim co-president of the UUA (along with Rev. Dr. Sofia Betancourt and Dr. Leon Spencer) following the resignation of Sinkford's successor, Rev. Peter Morales. Sinkford served until the election of a new president, Rev. Susan Frederick-Gray, in June 2017.

Since 2010, he has served as the senior minister for the First Unitarian Church in Portland, Oregon.

== Career ==
Between 1970 and 1980 Sinkford held management positions in marketing with Gillette, Avon Products, Johnson Products, and Revlon; he later founded his own business, Sinkford Restorations. Sinkford "turned to ministry" in 1993.

In 2001 he became the seventh president of the Unitarian Universalist Association of Congregations. In 2003, Sinkford said the "main goal of his presidency of the Unitarian Universalist Association was to reclaim a "vocabulary of reverence" within the association; he had been struck by the fact that the association's Purposes and Principles "contain not one piece of traditional religious language, not one word"; it includes generalizations about human dignity, justice and "the interdependent web of all existence," but does not do much "to capture our individual searches for truth and meaning." Sinkford has previously considered himself a "card-carrying atheist" who in 1997, after his comatose son had recovered, began to develop a "prayer life centered on thankfulness and gratefulness to God." William F. Schulz who had served as UUA president from 1985 to 1993, supported Sinkford's efforts to use a "wide lexicon" of religious language, and had "long been critical of the position of some humanists that would sanctify secular language and lock us into a calcified rationalism."

Sinkford was succeeded in 2009 by the Rev. Peter Morales.

Following the resignation of Morales in 2017, Sinkford was asked by the UUA Board to return as interim co-president for the roles of president as outlined in the UUA bylaws for the final three months of Morales's term. Sinkford shared the interim co-presidency with Rev. Sofía Betancourt of Starr King School for the Ministry and Dr. Leon Spencer, professor emeritus in Leadership, Technology, and Human Development at Georgia Southern University. Their interim co-presidency was a time of stabilization following the resignation of Morales and other key staff members at the UUA as well as the death of Moderator Jim Key, as well as discernment about the UUA's approach to racism and white supremacy. Sinkford's interim co-presidency ended with the election of Rev. Susan Frederick-Gray at the 2017 General Assembly.

In 2022, in recognition of a lifetime of service to the faith, Sinkford received at General Assembly 2022, to a standing ovation, the Award for Distinguished Service to the Cause of Unitarian Universalism, one of the most prestigious awards bestowed by the faith.

== Education ==
Sinkford was born in San Francisco and attended Harvard University, where he was among those vocal in their opposition to the U.S. involvement in the Vietnam War; upon commencement in 1968 he joined a group of students calling it "unjust and immoral" and pledging publicly not to serve in the armed forces, even if drafted. He graduated cum laude in 1968, then spent a year in Greece as a Michael Clark Rockefeller Fellow.

In 1995, Sinkford received his M.Div. from Starr King School for the Ministry. In 2002, Tufts University awarded Sinkford the degree of Doctor of Humane Letters, Honoris Causa.
