= Singing the Living Tradition =

1993 Unitarian Universalist hymnal

- Released: 1993
- Publisher: Unitarian Universalist Association
- No. of Hymns: 415
← Hymns for the Celebration of Life	Singing the Journey →

Singing the Living Tradition is a hymnal published by the Unitarian Universalist Association.

== History ==
First published in 1993 by the Hymnbook Resources Commission of the UUA, it was meant to be much more inclusive in both gender references, multicultural sources, and a wider number of religious inspirations. According to Jason Shelton,

Singing the Living Tradition was the first standard denominational hymnbook to include songs from Unitarians in Eastern Europe, spirituals from the African American tradition, folk and popular songs, music of major, non-Christian religious traditions, and chants and rounds gathered from the various traditions of the world.

The hymnal succeeded the UUA's first hymnal, Hymns for the Celebration of Life, which had been amended repeatedly in the decades after its initial 1964 publication due to concerns over biased gender language.

== List of hymns and tunes ==
The hymns are split up by subject, such as theme (Commitment/Action, Love and Compassion, Hope, Freedom, Justice, Stewardship of the Earth) time (Morning, Evening, The Seasons, Harvest, Solstice and Equinox), origin (Music of The Cultures of the World, Words from Sacred Traditions, The Jewish Spirit, The Christian Spirit), holiday (Kwanzaa, Pesach / Passover, Hanukkah, Advent, Christmas, Easter), and for specific services or parts of services (Entrance Songs, Chalice Lightings, Weddings, Memorials and Funerals, Recessionals).

Three of the hymns—"Your Mercy, Oh Eternal One", "Now I Recall My Childhood", and "There Are Numerous Strings"—were written by Rabindranath Tagore.

1. "May Nothing Evil Cross This Door"
2. "Down the Ages We Have Trod"
3. "The World Stands Out on Either Side"
4. "I Brought My Spirit to the Sea"
5. "It Is Something to Have Wept"
6. "Just as Long as I Have Breath"
7. "The Leaf Unfurling"
8. "Mother Spirit, Father Spirit"
9. "No Longer Forward nor Behind"
10. "Immortal Love"
11. "O God of Stars and Sunlight"
12. "O Life that Maketh All Things New"
13. "Songs of Spirit"
14. "The Sun at High Noon"
15. "The Lone, Wild Bird"
16. "'Tis a Gift to Be Simple"
17. "Every Night and Every Morn"
18. "What Wondrous Love"
19. "The Sun That Shines"
20. "Be Thou My Vision"
21. "For the Beauty of the Earth"
22. "Dear Weaver of Our Lives' Design"
23. "Bring Many Names"
24. "Far Rolling Voices"
25. "God of the Earth, the Sky, the Sea"
26. "Holy, Holy, Holy"
27. "I Am That Great and Fiery Force"
28. "View the Starry Realm"
29. "Joyful, Joyful, We Adore Thee"
30. "Over My Head / Music in the Air"
31. "Name Unnamed"
32. "Now Thank We All Our God"
33. "Sovereign and Transforming Grace"
34. "Though I May Speak with Bravest Fire"
35. "Into Thy Temple, Lord, Welcome"
36. "When in Our Music"
37. "God Who Fills the Universe"
38. "Morning Has Broken"
39. "Bring O Morn, Thy Music"
40. "Morning Hangs a Signal"
41. "You That Have Spent the Silent Night"
42. "Morning, So Fair to See"
43. "The Morning, Noiseless"
44. "We Sing of Golden Mornings"
45. "Now While the Day in Trailing Splendor"
46. "Now the Day Is Over"
47. "Now on Land and Sea Descending"
48. "Again, as Evening's Shadow Falls"
49. "Stillness Reigns"
50. "When Darkness Nears"
51. "Lady of the Seasons' Laughter"
52. "In Sweet Fields of Autumn"
53. "I Walk the Unfrequented Road"
54. "Now Light Is Less"
55. "Dark of Winter"
56. "Bells in the High Tower"
57. "All Beautiful the March of Days"
58. "Ring Out, Wild Bells"
59. "Almond Trees, Renewed in Bloom"
60. "In Time of Silver Rain"
61. "Lo, the Earth Awakens Again"
62. "When the Daffodils Arrive"
63. "Spring Has Now Unwrapped the Flowers"
64. "Oh Give Us Pleasure in the Flowers Today"
65. "The Sweet June Days"
66. "When the Summer Sun Is Shining"
67. "We Sing Now Together"
68. "Come, Ye Thankful People"
69. "Give Thanks"
70. "Heap High the Farmer's Wintry Hoard"
71. "In the Sprint with Plow and Harrow"
72. "Has Summer Come Now, Dawning"
73. "Chant for the Seasons"
74. "On the Dusty Earth Drum"
75. "The Harp at Nature's Advent"
76. "For Flowers That Bloom About Our Feet"
77. "Seek Not Afar for Beauty"
78. "Color and Fragrance"
79. "No Number Tallies Nature Up"
80. "Wild Waves of Storm"
81. "The Wordless Mountains Bravely Still"
82. "This Land of Bursting Sunrise"
83. "Winds Be Still"
84. "How Far Can Reach a Smile?"
85. "Although This Life Is But a Wraith"
86. "Blessed Spirit of My Life"
87. "Nearer, My God, to Thee"
88. "Calm Soul of All Things"
89. "Come, My Way, My Truth, My Life"
90. "From All the Fret and Fever of the Day"
91. "Mother of All"
92. "Mysterious Presence, Source of All"
93. "To Mercy, Pity, Peace, and Love"
94. "What Is This Life"
95. "There Is More Love Somewhere"
96. "I Cannot Think of Them as Dead"
97. "Sometimes I Feel Like a Motherless Child"
98. "Loveliest of Trees"
99. "Nobody Knows the Trouble I've Seen"
100. "I've Got Peace Like a River"
101. "Abide with Me"
102. "We the Heirs of Many Ages"
103. "For All the Saints"
104. "When Israel Was in Egypt's Land"
105. "From Age to Age"
106. "Who Would True Valor See"
107. "Now Sing We of the Brave of Old"
108. "My Life Flows on in Endless Song (How Can I Keep from Singing)"
109. "As We Come Marching, Marching"
110. "Come, Children of Tomorrow"
111. "Life of Ages"
112. "Do You Hear?"
113. "Where Is Our Holy Church?"
114. "Forward Through the Ages"
115. "God of Grace and God of Glory"
116. "I'm on My Way"
117. "O Light of Life"
118. "This Little Light of Mine"
119. "Once to Every Soul and Nation"
120. "Turn Back"
121. "We'll Build a Land"
122. "Sound Over All Waters"
123. "Spirit of Life"
124. "Be That Guide"
125. "From the Crush of Wealth and Power"
126. "Come, Thou Fount of Every Blessing"
127. "Can I see Another's Woe?"
128. "For All That Is Our Life"
129. "Let Love Continue Long"
130. "O Liberating Rose"
131. "Love Will Guide Us"
132. "Bright Those Jewels"
133. "One World"
134. "Our World Is One World"
135. "How Happy Are They"
136. "Where Gentle Tides Go Rolling By"
137. "We Utter Our Cry"
138. "These Things Shall Be"
139. "Wonders Still the World Shall Witness"
140. "Hail the Glorious Golden City"
141. "I've Got a New Name"
142. "Let There Be Light"
143. "Not in Vain the Distance Beacons"
144. "Now Is the Time Approaching"
145. "As Tranquil Streams"
146. "Soon the Day Will Arrive"
147. "When All the Peoples on This Earth"
148. "Let Freedom Span Both East and West"
149. "Lift Every Voice and Sing"
150. "All Whose Boast It Is"
151. "I Wish I Knew How"
152. "Follow the Drinking Gourd"
153. "Oh, I Woke Up This Morning"
154. "No More Auction Block for Me"
155. "Circle Round for Freedom"
156. "Oh, Freedom"
157. "Step by Step the Longest March"
158. "Praise the Source of Faith and Learning"
159. "This Is My Song"
160. "Far Too Long, by Fear Divided"
161. "Peace! The Perfect Word"
162. "Gonna Lay Down My Sword and Shield"
163. "For the Earth Forever Turning"
164. "The Peace Not Past Our Understanding"
165. "When Windows That Are Black and Cold"
166. "Years Are Coming"
167. "Nothing But Peace Is Enough"
168. "One More Step"
169. "We Shall Overcome"
170. "We Are a Gentle, Angry People"
171. "N'kosi Sikelel' l'Afrika"
172. "Siph' Amandla"
173. "In the Branches of the Forest"
174. "O Earth, You Are Surpassing Fair"
175. "We Celebrate the Web of Life"
176. "Daya Kar Daan Bhakli Ka"
177. "Sakura"
178. "Raghupati"
179. "That We Hold Tight"
180. "Alhamdulillah"
181. "No Matter If You Live Now Far or Near"
182. "O, the Beauty in a Life"
183. "The Wind of Change Forever Blown"
184. "Be Ye Lamps Unto Yourselves"
185. "Your Mercy, Oh Eternal One"
186. "Grieve Not Your Heart"
187. "It Sounds Along the Ages"
188. "Come, Come, Whoever You Are"
189. "Light of Ages and of Nations"
190. "Light of Ages and of Nations"
191. "Now I Recall My Childhood"
192. "Nay, Do Not Grieve"
193. "Our Faith Is But a Single Gem"
194. "Faith Is a Forest"
195. "Let Us Wander Where We Will"
196. "Singer of Life"
197. "There Are Numerous Strings"
198. "God of Many Names"
199. "Precious Lord, Take My Hand"
200. "A Mighty Fortress"
201. "Glory, Glory, Hallelujah"
202. "Come Sunday"
203. "All Creatures of the Earth and Sky"
204. "Come, O Sabbath Day"
205. "Amazing Grace! (3/4 time)"
206. "Amazing Grace! (4/4 time)"
207. "Earth Was Given as a Garden"
208. "Every Time I Feel the Spirit"
209. "O Come, You Longing Thirsty Souls"
210. "Wade in the Water"
211. "We Are Climbing Jacob's Ladder"
212. "We Are Dancing Sarah's Circle"
213. "There Is a Wideness in Your Mercy"
214. "Shabbat Shalom"
215. "Praise to the Living God"
216. "Hashiveinu"
217. "O Sing Hallelujah"
218. "Who Can Say"
219. "O Hear, My People"
220. "Bring Out the Festal Bread"
221. "Light One Candle"
222. "Mi Y'Malel"
223. "Rock of Ages, Let Our Song"
224. "Let Christmas Come"
225. "O Come, O Come, Emmanuel"
226. "People, Look East"
227. "Crèche Flickers Bright Here"
228. "Once in Royal David's City"
229. "Gather 'Round the Manger"
230. "Duermete, Niño Lindo"
231. "Angels We Have Heard on High"
232. "The Hills Are Bare at Bethlehem"
233. "Bring a Torch, Jeannette, Isabella"
234. "In the Gentle of the Moon"
235. "Deck the Halls with Boughs of Holly"
236. "O Thou Joyful Day"
237. "The First Nowell"
238. "Within the Shining of a Star"
239. "Go Tell It on the Mountain"
240. "I Heard the Bells on Christmas Day"
241. "In the Bleak Midwinter"
242. "In the Lonely Midnight"
243. "Jesus, Our Brother"
244. "It Came Upon the Midnight Clear"
245. "Joy to the World!"
246. "O Little Town of Bethlehem" ["St. Louis" version]
247. "O Little Town of Bethlehem" ["Forest Green" version]
248. "O We Believe in Christmas"
249. "On This Day Everywhere"
250. "Purer Than Purest"
251. "Silent Night, Holy Night"
252. "Stille Nacht"
253. "O Come, All Ye Faithful"
254. "Sing We Now of Christmas"
255. "There's a Star in the East"
256. "Winter Night"
257. "'Twas in the Moon of Wintertime"
258. "Whence, O Shepherd Maiden?"
259. "We Three Kings of Orient Are"
260. "Oshana, Shira Oshana"
261. "When Jesus Wept"
262. "Hosanna in the Highest"
263. "When Jesus Looked from Olivet"
264. "Now in the Tomb Is Laid"
265. "O Sacred Head, Now Wounded"
266. "Now the Green Blade Riseth"
267. "When Mary Through the Garden Went"
268. "Jesus Christ Is Risen Today"
269. "Lo, the Day of Days Is Here"
270. "O Day of Light and Gladness"
271. "Come Down, O Love Divine"
272. "O Prophet Souls of All the Years"
273. "Immortal, Invisible"
274. "Dear Mother-Father of Us All"
275. "Joyful Is the Dark"
276. "O Young and Fearless Prophet"
277. "When We Wend Homeward"
278. "Praise Be to God, the Almighty"
279. "By the Waters of Babylon"
280. "Helejuhu"
281. "O God, Our Help in Ages Past"
282. "Let the Whole Creation Cry"
283. "The Spacious Firmament on High"
284. "Praise, O My Heart, to You"
285. "We Worship Thee, God"
286. "A Core of Silence"
287. "Faith of the Larger Liberty"
288. "All Are Architects"
289. "Creative Love, Our Thanks We Give"
290. "Bring, O Past, Your Honor"
291. "Die Gedanken Sind Frei"
292. "If I Can Stop One Heart from Breaking"
293. "O Star of Truth"
294. "Our Praise We Give"
295. "Sing Out Praises for the Journey"
296. "O Ye Who Taste That Love Is Sweet"
297. "The Star of Truth"
298. "Wake, Now, My Senses"
299. "Make Channels for the Streams of Love"
300. "With Heart and Mind"
301. "Touch the Earth, Reach the Sky!"
302. "Children of the Human Race"
303. "We Are the Earth Upright and Proud"
304. "A Fierce Unrest"
305. "De Colores"
306. "Sing of Living, Sing of Dying"
307. "The Human Touch Can Light the Flame"
308. "The Blessings of the Earth and Sky"
309. "Earth Is Our Homeland"
310. "The Earth Is Home"
311. "Let It Be a Dance"
312. "Here on the Paths of Every Day"
313. "O What a Piece of Work Are We"
314. "We are Children of the Earth"
315. "This Old World"
316. "Tradition Held Fast sheet music"
317. "We Are Not Our Own"
318. "We Would Be One"
319. "Ye Earthborn Children of a Star"
320. "The Pen Is Greater"
321. "Here in the Flesh"
322. "Thanks Be for These"
323. "Break Not the Circle"
324. "Where My Free Spirit Onward Leads"
325. "Love Makes a Bridge"
326. "Let All the Beauty We Have Known"
327. "Joy, Thou Goddess"
328. "I Sought the Wood in Summer"
329. "Life Has Loveliness to Sell"
330. "The Arching Sky of Morning Glows"
331. "Life Is the Greatest Gift of All"
332. "Perfect Singer"
333. "Alone She Cuts and Binds the Grain"
334. "When Shall We Learn"
335. "Once When My Heart Was Passion Free"
336. "All My Memories of Love"
337. "Have I Not Known"
338. "I Seek the Spirit of a Child"
339. "Knowledge, They Say"
340. "Though Gathered Here to Celebrate"
341. "O World, Thou Choosest Not the Better Part"
342. "O Slowly, Slowly, They Return"
343. "A Firemist and a Planet"
344. "A Promise Through the Ages Rings"
345. "With Joy We Claim the Growing Light"
346. "Come, Sing a Song with Me"
347. "Gather the Spirit"
348. "Guide My Feet"
349. "We Gather Together"
350. "The Ceaseless Flow of Endless Time"
351. "A Long, Long Way the Sea-Winds Blow"
352. "Find a Stillness"
353. "Golden Breaks the Dawn instrumental"
354. "We Laugh, We Cry (aka Credo)"
355. "We Lift Our Hearts in Thanks"
356. "Will You Seek in Far-Off Places?"
357. "Bright Morning Stars"
358. "Rank by Rank Again We Stand"
359. "When We are Gathered"
360. "Here We Have Gathered"
361. "Enter, Rejoice, and Come In"
362. "Rise Up, O Flame"
363. "Alleluia! Sang Stars"
364. "Alleluia, Alleluia"
365. "Praise God"
366. "Heleluyan"
367. "Allelu, Allelu"
368. "Now Let Us Sing"
369. "This Is the Truth That Passes Understanding"
370. "All People That on Earth Do Dwell"
371. long metre tune for lyrics 374-382
372. long metre tune for lyrics 374-382
373. long metre tune for lyrics 374-382
374. lyrics for interchangeable use with 371-373
375. lyrics for interchangeable use with 371-373
376. lyrics for interchangeable use with 371-373
377. lyrics for interchangeable use with 371-373
378. lyrics for interchangeable use with 371-373
379. lyrics for interchangeable use with 371-373
380. lyrics for interchangeable use with 371-373
381. lyrics for interchangeable use with 371-373
382. lyrics for interchangeable use with 371-373
383. "Alleluia, Amen"
384. "Alleluia"
385. "Gloria"
386. "Alleluia Chaconne"
387. "The Earth, Water, Fire, Air"
388. "Dona Nobis Pacem"
389. "Gathered Here"
390. "Gaudeamus Hodie"
391. "Voice Still and Small"
392. "Hineh Mah Tov"
393. "Jubilate Deo"
394. "Have Nashirah"
395. "Sing and Rejoice"
396. "I Know This Rose Will Open"
397. "Morning Has Come"
398. "To See the World"

== Evensong ==
Evensong is the name of a programmed series of gatherings undertaken as part of the Unitarian Universalist Association's Adult Religious Education initiative. The goal is to deepen spiritual awareness and commitment while increasing fellowship among members. The format includes hymns and readings from Singing the Living Tradition followed by a discussion on a pertinent spiritual topic. The gathering is closed with another hymn.
