= Church of the Larger Fellowship =

Religious establishment

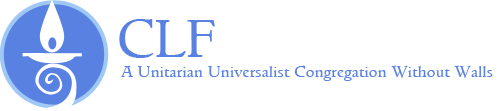
- CLF Logo
- Church of the Larger Fellowship
- 42°21′05″N 71°02′54″W
- Location: Boston
- Country: United States
- Denomination: Unitarian Universalist Association

The Church of the Larger Fellowship (CLF) provides a ministry to isolated Unitarian Universalists (UUs). Its mission also includes growing Unitarian Universalism by supporting small congregations and new UUs around the world. The CLF also offers resources to Unitarian Universalists active in local congregations. As of 2025, the CLF is the largest congregation by membership in the Unitarian Universalist Association.

The CLF provides an outreach ministry, which includes the CLF's Military Ministry and a Prison Ministry. The CLF also provides email list communities, discussions, and web-based education materials. CLF members have access to a lending library of books, CDs, videotapes, and sermons; lifespan religious education curricula and self-study guides; and the monthly distribution of sermons and other worship material through its worship publication, Quest. The CLF also podcasts sermons and readings from Quest and offers online courses on its website.

== History ==
The CLF was founded in 1944 as a part of the American Unitarian Association's Extension Department with the purpose of serving Unitarians living in areas that lacked Unitarian congregations. In 1947, Rev. Dr. Clinton Lee Scott helped organize the Universalist Church of the Larger Fellowship, which was merged with the Unitarian CLF in 1961. The CLF was incorporated in 1970 as an independent congregation, with the same polity as any other congregation in the UUA.

== Community Resources ==
The CLF "Church-on-Loan" program provides worship and program materials to families and small, mostly lay-led UU congregations.

== Church of the Younger Fellowship ==
In 2005, the Church of the Younger Fellowship (CYF) was established and run by young adults to help connect Unitarian Universalists ages 18-35, but has since gone defunct.

== Military Ministry ==
The CLF Military Ministry is the newest outreach program for the CLF. Working with UU military chaplains and chaplain candidates, and with the support of the UU Funding Program's Fund for Unitarian Universalism, the CLF created a new website by and for UUs in the military.

== Prisoner Ministry ==
The CLF Ministries to prisoner members provides a Unitarian Universalist church home for incarcerated UUs.

=== Letter-Writing Ministry ===
CLF's Letter-Writing Ministry matches CLF prisoner-members with non-incarcerated Unitarian Universalists to exchange letters.
