= Earl Morse Wilbur =

Earl Morse Wilbur (April 26, 1866, in Jericho, Vermont – January 8, 1956, in Berkeley, California) was an American Unitarian minister, educator, and historian of Unitarianism. He was son of Lafayette Wilbur, who published an autobiography.

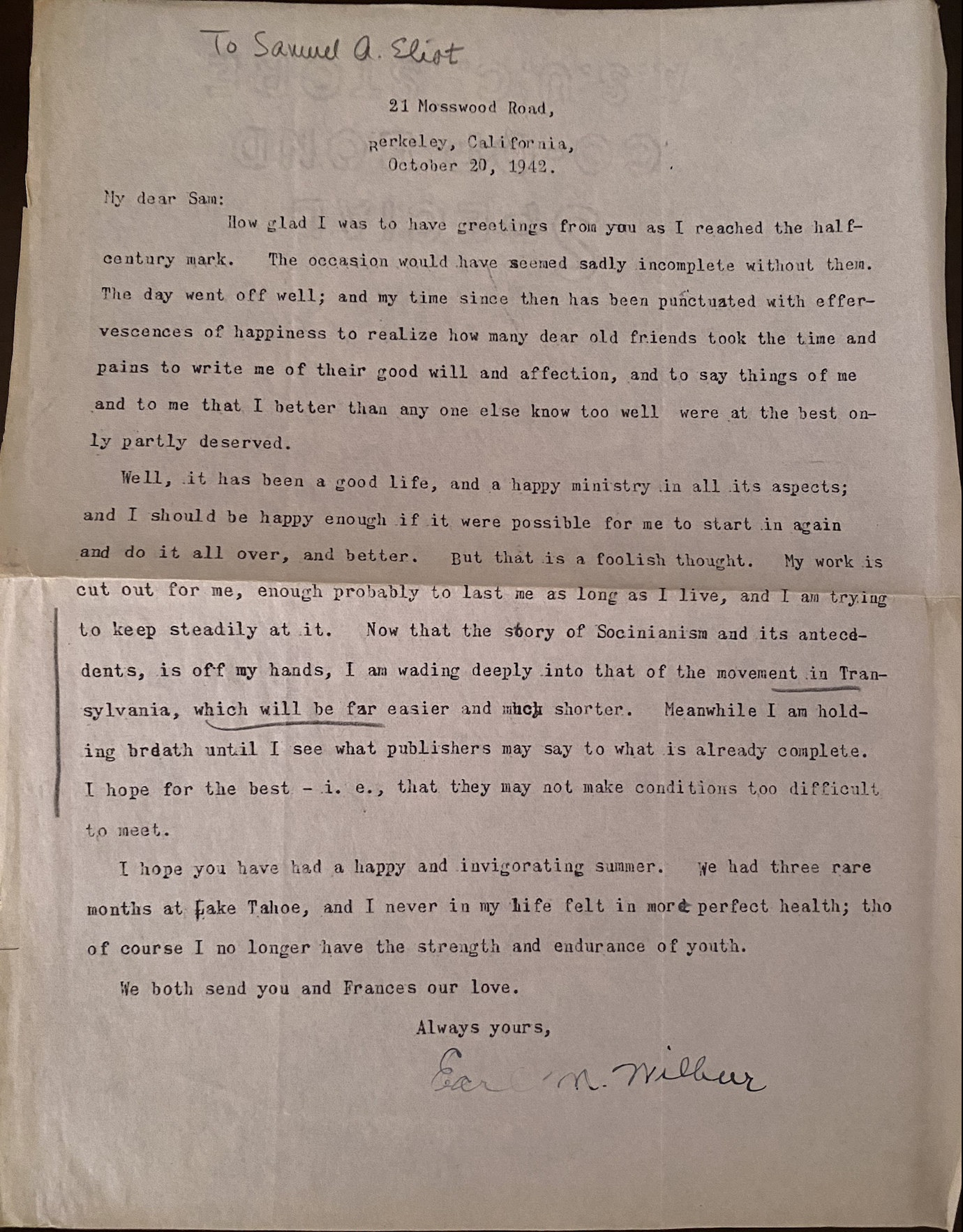
1942 letter by Earl Morse Wilbur to Samuel Atkins Eliot concerning his progress on his two volume history of Unitarianism.

Wilbur was the first dean 1904-1910; then president 1911-1931; and until 1934, professor of homiletics and practical theology at the Pacific Unitarian School for Ministry, Berkeley, California of the American Unitarian Association (AUA). His writings focused on the development of Unitarianism within European Christianity.

He graduated from University of Vermont and Harvard Divinity School.

== Works ==
- Wilbur, Earl Morse (1925). Our Unitarian Heritage: An Introduction To The History Of The Unitarian Movement. Boston: The Beacon Press.
- Wilbur, Earl Morse (1945). A History of Unitarianism, Vol. I (PDF) (1977 ed.). Cambridge: Harvard University Press.
- Wilbur, Earl Morse (1945). A History of Unitarianism, Vol. II (PDF) (1977 ed.). Cambridge: Harvard University Press.
