= William F. Schulz =

The Reverend William F. Schulz
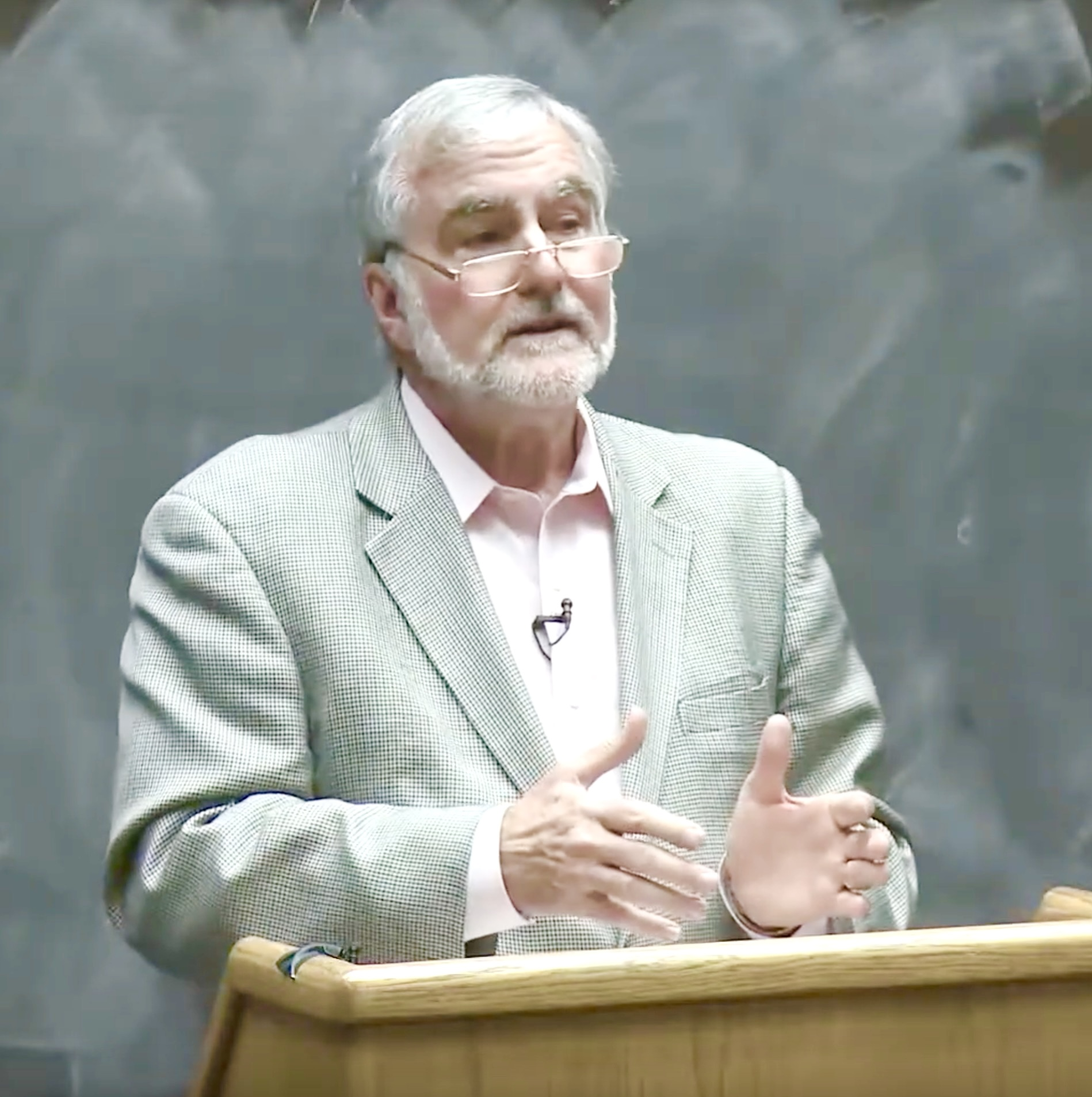

5th President of the Unitarian Universalist Association
- In office 1985–1993
- Preceded by: Rev. O. Eugene Pickett
- Succeeded by: Rev. John A. Buehrens

Personal details
- Born: November 14, 1949 (age 76) Pittsburgh, Pennsylvania, U.S.
- Spouse: Beth Graham
- Occupation: Unitarian Universalist minister, former Amnesty International executive director

Religious life
- Religion: Unitarian Universalism
- Denomination: Unitarian Universalist Association
- Profession: Minister

William F. Schulz (born November 14, 1949) is a Unitarian Universalist minister who is most known for his role as the executive director of Amnesty International USA, the U.S. division of Amnesty International, from March 1994 to 2006. He is a prominent spokesperson, activist, and author focusing primarily on the issue of Human Rights and United States' Government role in promoting or disregarding them. In addition to his many public appearances, he has been affiliated with numerous non-profit organizations and universities.

== Early life ==
William Schulz was born November 14, 1949, to Professor William F. Schulz and Jean Schulz in Pittsburgh, Pennsylvania. He attended Oberlin College for his undergraduate degree, which he completed in 1971. He earned a master's degree from University of Chicago in 1974, and completed his Doctorate of Ministry at Meadville Lombard Theological School in 1975. He married his wife Reverend Beth Graham, who is also a Unitarian minister, in 1993.

== Career ==
=== Unitarian Universalist Minister ===
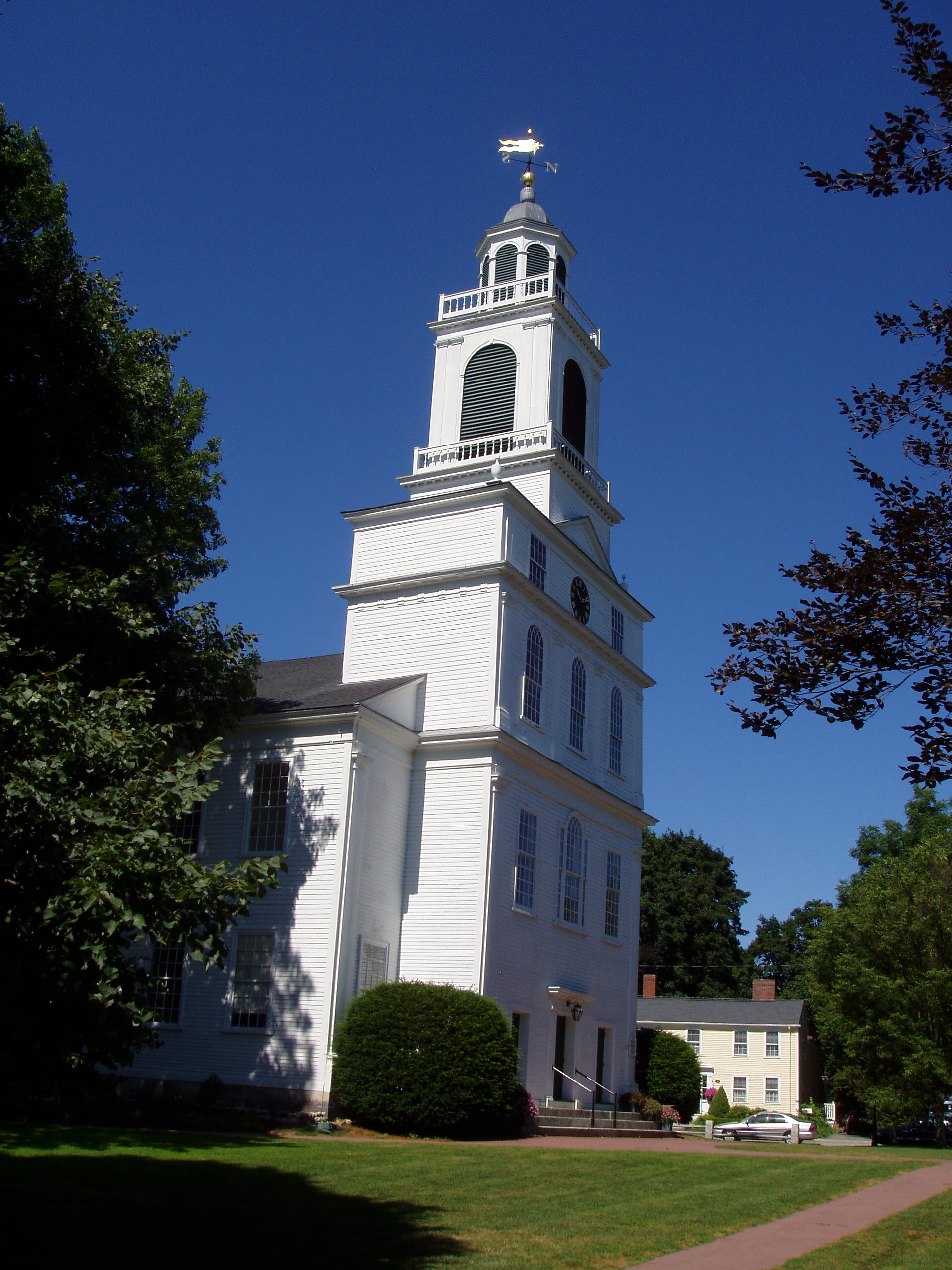
First Parish Unitarian Church

Schulz served as a minister in Massachusetts, at the First Parish Unitarian Universalist church in Bedford, Massachusetts, from 1975 to 1978, then as the president of Unitarian Universalist Association in Boston until 1993.

=== Amnesty International ===
Schulz most noted role is as the executive director for Amnesty International USA, an NGO focused on human rights, from 1994 to 2006. During this time he made numerous appearances as a guest on national radio and television programs, and testified before Congress concerning human rights issues. During his tenure, Amnesty International was seen to become increasingly interventionist in its policies, advocating that states take a more active role in secure human rights protections, encouraging collaboration with law enforcement and even military force.

His own writings during his tenure emphasized the importance of the Universal Declaration of Human Rights as an embodiment of the international conception of human rights. During his acceptance speech for the Humanist of the Year from the American Humanist Association in 2000, he said "The fact is that the world community has never been able to agree upon the divine basis for human rights or a basis derived from natural law. But there is a third broad way to justify human rights which, while it doesn't provide them with the status of God's endorsement or nature's sanction, does ground them in the human community. That third way goes by many names—pragmatism, communitarianism, and post-modernism among others—but is ultimately nothing more than an expression of the humanist impulse."

Also during his tenure, the increasing economic ties with China led to scrutiny and debate about China's policies regarding human rights. During his testimony to the United States House, he criticized the increased use of the death penalty as well as the use of imprisonment and torture against democratic activists and ethnic and religious minorities. In particular in arguing against continued MFN status with China, he said "the message is clear, good trade relations in the midst of human rights violations is acceptable to the United States."

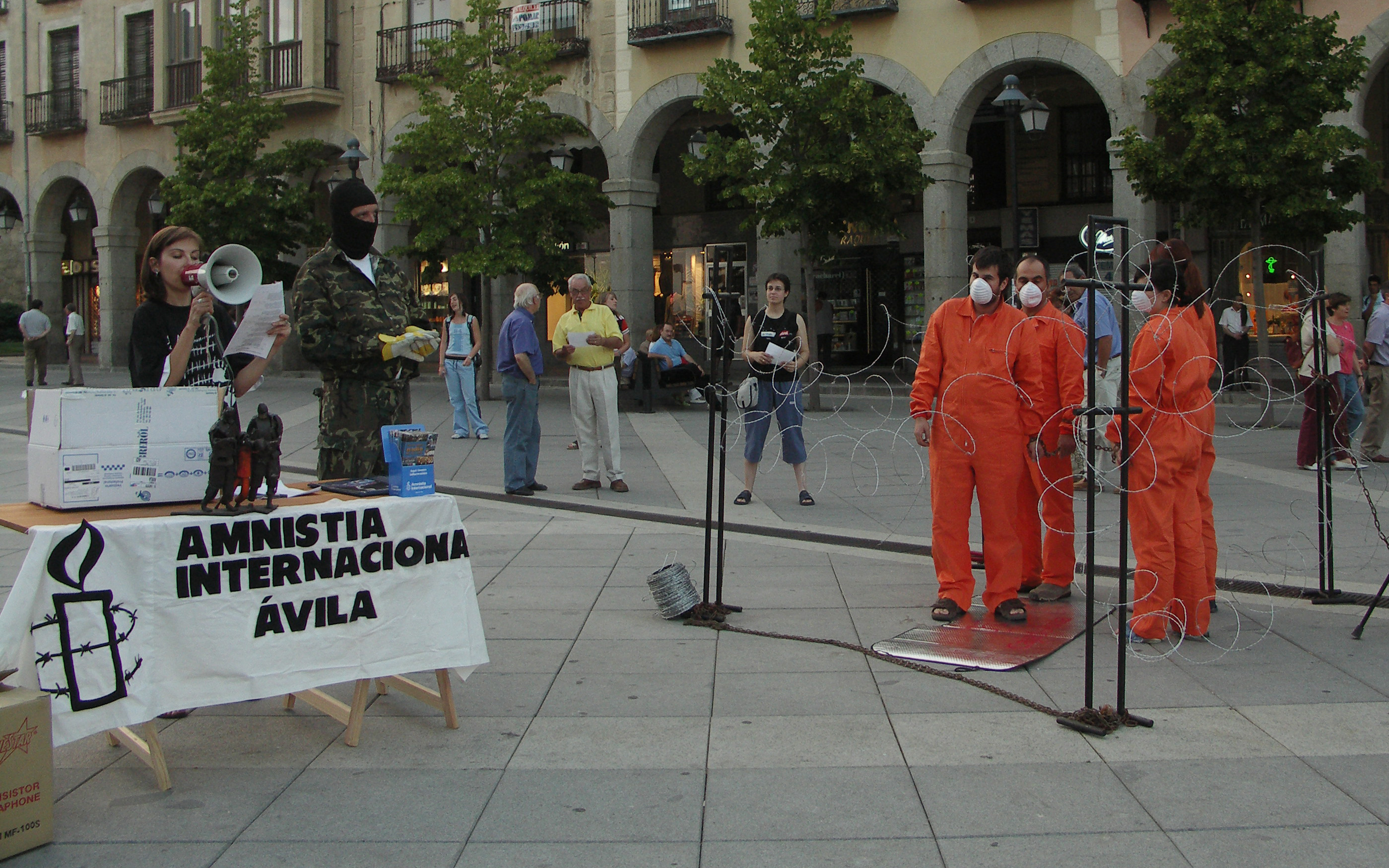
Protest against human rights violation at Guantánamo Bay prison (June 2006)

The events of the September 11 attacks, and the subsequent expansion of the United States counter-terrorism efforts were the subject of his 2003 book Tainted Legacy: 9/11 and the Ruin of Human Rights which finds him criticizing both the government's use of torture, which he credits with inspiring terrorists, as well as some of his human rights activist colleagues for failing to frame terrorism and genocide as a human rights issues.

=== Unitarian Universalist Service Committee ===
Schulz served as the president and chief executive officer for the Unitarian Universalist Service Committee from 2010 until this retirement 2016.

=== Writer ===
Schulz has been the author of numerous books throughout his career and during his retirement, as well as a frequent contributor to periodicals. A selection of his books include:

- What Torture Taught Me: And Other Reflections on Justice and Theology, 2013.
- Tainted Legacy: 9/11 and the Ruin of Human Rights, 2003
- Making the Manifesto: The Birth of Religious Humanism, 2002
- In Our Own Best Interest: How Defending Human Rights Benefits Us All, 2001

== Affiliations ==
Schulz served on the boards of numerous organizations including People for the American Way, Planned Parenthood, Communitarian Network, and Americans United for the Separation of Church and State. He is a senior fellow at the Carr Center for Human Rights Policy at Harvard's Kennedy School of Government, a senior fellow at the Center for American Progress, an adjunct professor of international relations at The New School and an affiliate professor of preaching and public ethics at Meadville Lombard Theological School in Chicago.
