= Occult macular dystrophy =

- Specialty: Ophthalmology

Occult macular dystrophy (OMD) is a rare inherited degradation of the retina, characterized by progressive loss of function in the most sensitive part of the central retina (macula), the location of the highest concentration of light-sensitive cells (photoreceptors) but presenting no visible abnormality. "Occult" refers to the degradation in the fundus being difficult to discern. The disorder is called "dystrophy" instead of "degradation" to distinguish its genetic origin from other causes, such as age. OMD was first reported by Y. Miyake et al. in 1989.

== Symptoms and signs ==
An Amsler grid, as seen by a person with normal vision.

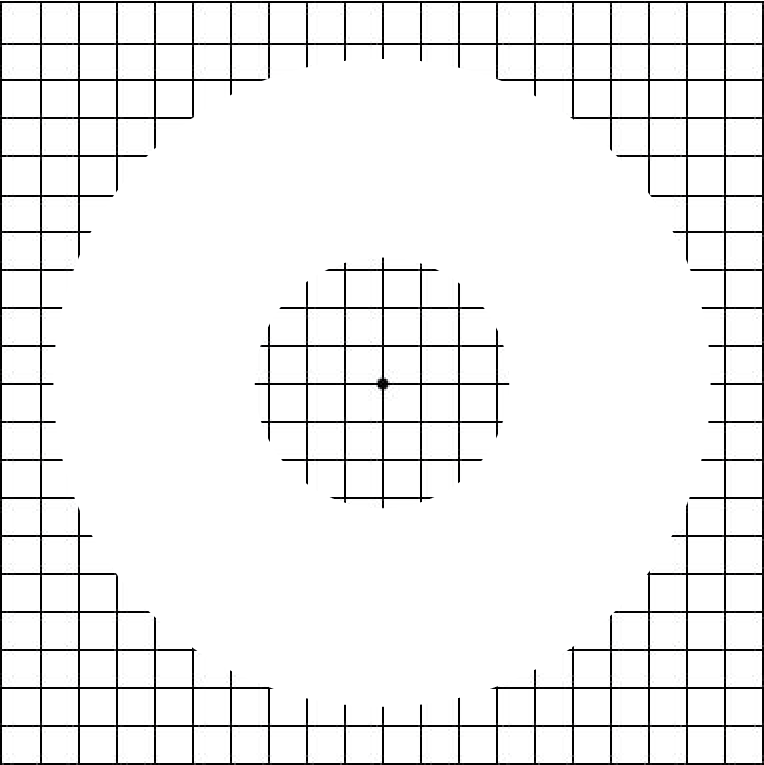
An Amsler grid as seen by a patient with OMD. Nearby color fills blind spots.

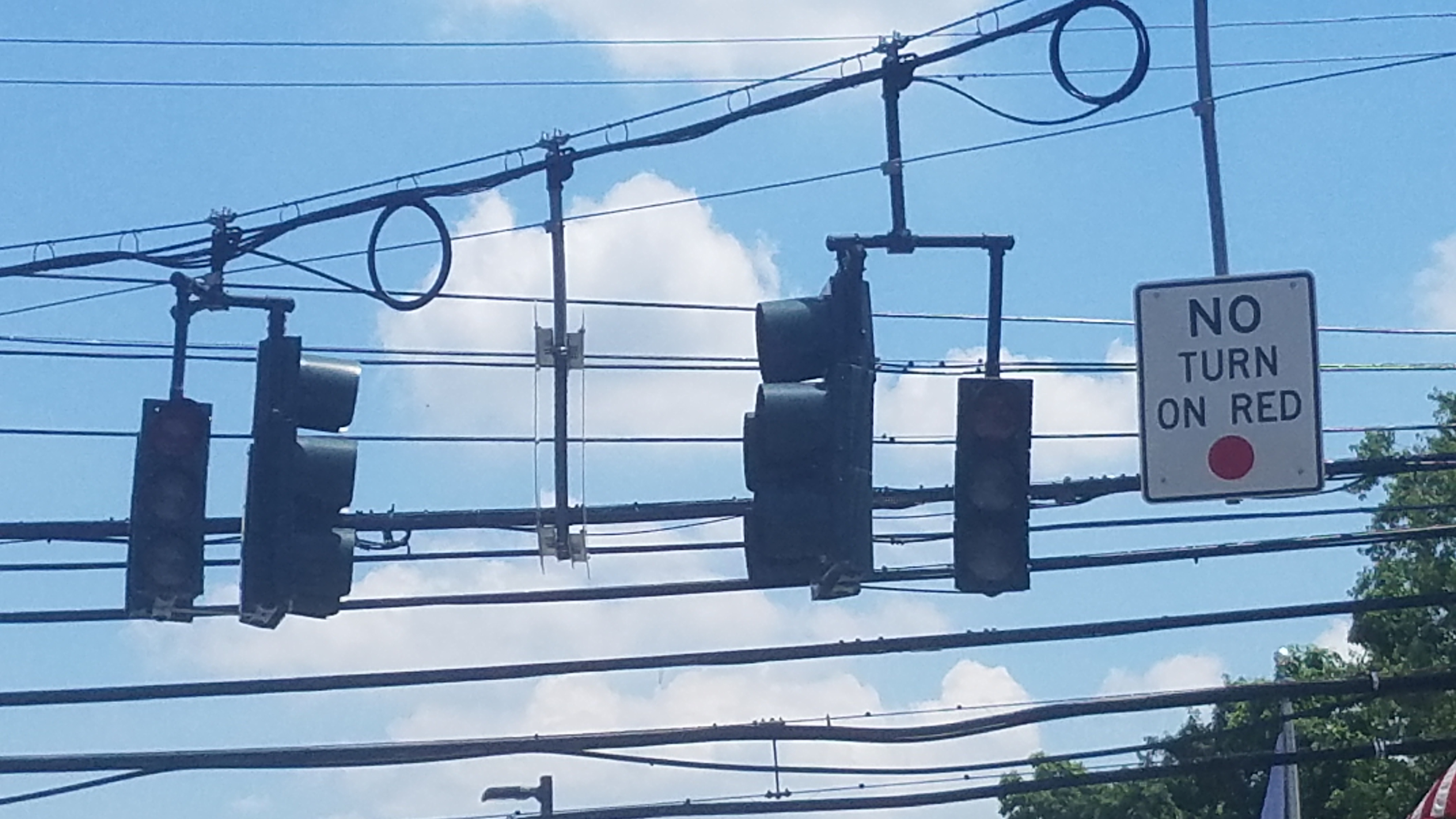
Perception of traffic light in early-stage OMD if patient's line of sight is not directly at lit color

Symptoms entail a loss of visual acuity in both eyes, including darkened vision, ring scotoma (ring of blindness close to the center of vision), color blindness, and difficulty with bright lights. The scotoma may cause text slightly away from the center of vision to disappear; the appearance would not be black (in early stages) but of the same color as the nearby background. Many lines of an Amsler grid would be faded or invisible to the patient. The area of invisibility on the Amsler grid spreads with time. Symptoms do not include headaches or eye pain. The loss of acuity tends to be symmetric between the eyes.

== Etiology ==
OMD that is caused by mutations of the retinitis pigmentosa 1-like 1 (RP1L1) gene (OMIM 608581) is called Miyake's disease. While the mutation is dominant, OMD may manifest more strongly and earlier in children than in the parent (anticipation). However, cases have presented with no mutation to RP1L1. One study suggests that OMD arises because of two mutations arising simultaneously, one in RP1L1 and another in ABCA4.

OMD is generally believed to be autosomal dominant, meaning that if you get the abnormal gene from only one parent, you can get the disease. However, this does not always seem to be the case.

OMD differentiates from Stargardt macular dystrophy in which gene is mutated (RP1L1 instead of ABCA4), the process of OMD isn't a buildup of toxic lipofuscin, and Stargardt is recessive.

=== Physiology ===
The connection between these mutations and OMD is unclear, but cone density is significantly lower in patients with OMD compared to the general population. Use of adaptive optics to obtain high-resolution retinal images reveal abnormal changes in patients with OMD, including thinning of the foveal thickness and the outer nuclear layer and disruption of the IS/OS line and COST line.

== Diagnosis ==
OMD returns negative results for a funduscopic inspection, fluorescein angiogram, and full-field electroretinogram (ERG), for both rod and cone components. The key to diagnosing this disorder is the multifocal ERG (mfERG), providing a single procedure for diagnosis. Onset is known to range from age 6 to 81, with about half of onsets occurring after age 65.

=== Differential diagnosis ===
A visual field test can differentiate between whether the reduced visual acuity is centered on the optic nerve or the fundus.

Once a neurological problem has, therefore, been ruled out, the disorder's reduced visual acuity without visible fundus abnormalities may be misdiagnosed as optic neuritis, dominant optic atrophy, amblyopia, or nonorganic visual disorder.

The combination of weak amplitudes in the mfERG with no visible fundus abnormalities then rules out other explanations. For example, patients with OMD have an abnormal mfERG but a normal full-field ERG while patients with retinitis pigmentosa have a markedly abnormal mfERG and also an abnormal full-field ERG.

== Prognosis ==
Since the abnormality is not in the eye lens, the disease is not correctable with eyeglasses. Vision becomes dimmer over the course of years as the macula loses function. Eventually the patient may become legally blind. The peripheral vision field is preserved. In other words, OMD does not cause total blindness, due to the concentration of the degradation at the cone-rich (color-sensitive) region of the retina. No treatment is known to slow the progression. The speed of progression varies by case — even between donor and recipient of the mutation — and can last for 10 to 30 years.

== Prevalence ==
Prevalence is unknown, but seems to be elevated in Asian populations, given that most OMD studies are of Japanese and Korean subjects. Given that Stargardt's, the most common macular dystrophy, has a prevalence of 1 in 10,000 in the US, the prevalence of OMD is likely well below 1 in 100,000.

== Future research ==
Because of the rarity of OMD, no clinical trials are in the pipeline as of January 2019. However, mutations in RP1L1 might play a role in retinitis pigmentosa (RP), raising hope for a spillover effect for OMD patients should an RP1L1-related treatment be developed for RP. Given the possible relation between ABCA4 and OMD, progress with Stargardt disease via gene therapy might have a spillover effect for OMD patients as well.

Adeno-associated viral (AAV) vectors have been particularly successful in gene therapy of eyes and muscles. Unfortunately, their size is limited--too limited to hold the RP1L1 gene. Therefore, a non-viral approach would need to be developed for gene therapy to treat OMD. Since RP1 has the same size problem, a gene therapy for RP could have a spillover effect for OMD.

A stem-cell approach might entail taking stem cells from the patient, editing the mutation with CRISR, and inserting the stem cells in the eye. However, as of 2014, researchers did not yet know if retinal stem cell surgery would work.
