= Starr King School for the Ministry =

Unitarian Universalist seminary in Oakland, California

- Former names: Starr King School for Religious Leadership, Pacific Unitarian School for the Ministry
- Type: Graduate theological seminary
- Established: 1904
- Religious affiliation: Unitarian Universalist Association
- President: Stephanie L. Krusemark
- Dean: Gabriella Lettini
- Students: 85
- Location: Oakland, California, United States; 37.877015°N 122.261859°W
- Website: www.sksm.edu

Starr King School for the Ministry is a multi-religious Unitarian Universalist seminary in Oakland, California. The seminary was formed in 1904 to educate leaders for the growing number of progressive religious communities in the western part of the US. The school emphasizes the practical skills of religious leadership through the lens of Educating to Counter Oppressions (ECO). Today, it educates Unitarian Universalist ministers, religious educators, and spiritual activists, as well as progressive religious leaders from a variety of traditions, including Christianity, Islam, Judaism, Buddhism, earth-centered traditions, and others.

== History ==
Starr King School for the Ministry opened in 1904 as the Pacific Unitarian School for the Ministry. With most Unitarian ministers being educated at Harvard Divinity School in Cambridge, Massachusetts, and Meadville Lombard Theological School in Chicago, Illinois, the new seminary would meet the need to train religious leaders serving the progressive churches west of the Rocky Mountains. The school held its first classes at the First Unitarian Church of Oakland, moving just a few years later to the City of Berkeley to be closer to other "Holy Hill" seminaries and the University of California, Berkeley. The first president was Earl Morse Wilbur. In addition to his service to the school for 30 years, he is remembered for writing the first comprehensive histories of European Unitarianism.

In 1941, the school changed its name to honor the Rev. Thomas Starr King, minister of the First Unitarian Church of San Francisco. During the Civil War, the popular lecturer and activist spoke zealously in favor of the Union and was credited by Abraham Lincoln with preventing California from becoming a separate republic. In addition, he organized the Pacific Branch of the United States Sanitary Commission, which cared for wounded soldiers and was the predecessor to the American Red Cross. King's prominence also contributed greatly to the spread of Unitarianism on the West Coast.

In 1962, the "Holy Hill" seminaries officially formed the Graduate Theological Union (GTU). Starr King was a member of the GTU from 1964 until 2020. From the 1960s up through the mid-1980s the seminary was known as the Starr King School for Religious Leadership.

When Rev. Dr. Rebecca Parker became President of the school in 1990, she was the first woman to serve as the permanent head of an accredited U.S. theological school. She is an ordained minister of the United Methodist Church with dual fellowship in the Unitarian Universalist Association.

=== 21st century "New Beginning" ===
In 2019, the school began a process known as "New Beginnings" to ensure its future sustainability. These steps included selling its building in Berkeley and moving to a new facility in Oakland in 2022, leaving the GTU in 2020, and staff/faculty reductions.

=== Presidents ===
- Earl Morse Wilbur 1904–1931
- William Morgan (1931–?)
- Josiah Bartlett 1949–1969
- Robert C. Kimball 1969–1983
- Gordon B. McKeeman 1983–1988
- Rebecca Ann Parker 1990–2014
- Rosemary Bray McNatt 2014–2025
- Stephanie L. Krusemark 2025–present

== Academics ==
Starr King School for the Ministry educates people for Unitarian Universalist ministry and for progressive religious leadership in society. Its approach to the study of theology is inspired by Unitarian Universalism's liberal religious values. It is dedicated to providing student-centered, multi-religious, counter-oppressive graduate education that cultivates multi-religious life and learning, and creates just and sustainable communities.

The school offers two master's degrees: Master of Divinity (M.Div.) and Master of Arts in Social Change (M.A.S.C.). It also offers certificates in Chaplaincy Studies, Unitarian Universalist Studies, Multi-Religious Studies, and Psychedelic Justice & Companioning.

The school is accredited by the Association of Theological Schools (ATS).
