= General Assembly (Unitarian Universalist Association) =

Annual gathering of N. American Unitarian Universalists

- Status: Active
- Genre: Convention
- Date: June 24, 2020 to June 28, 2020
- Frequency: Annual
- Location: Virtual due to COVID-19 (2020)
- Organiser: Unitarian Universalist Association
- Website: uua.org/ga

General Assembly (GA) is an annual gathering of Unitarian Universalists of the Unitarian Universalist Association. It is held in June, in a different city in the United States every year. The last GA held outside the United States was in Quebec in 2002, after which congregations belonging to the Canadian Unitarian Council separated from the UUA. Member congregations (and three associate member organizations) send delegates and conventioneers to participate in the plenary sessions, workshops, regional gatherings, public witness events, and worship services. In recent years, attendance at each General Assembly has reached over 5,500.

== Events ==
The General Assembly opens with a parade of banners borne by members of and representing member churches and associated organizations. General Sessions of General Assembly consist of discussing and voting on Study Action Issues and Statements of Conscience; elections for Board of Trustees, officer and committee positions; and reports from the President, Moderator and other leaders of the UUA. A Synergy Bridging ceremony is held to congratulate graduates of individual churches' Religious Education programs.

In addition, the event is keynoted by the Ware Lectures, which are offered by individuals selected by the President in consultation with the General Assembly Planning Committee; they have been held since 1922 by the preceding American Unitarian Association in honor of Harriet E. Ware, who bequeathed $5,000 to the AUA. Previous Ware Lecturers have included Reverends Martin Luther King Jr. and Jesse Jackson, author Kurt Vonnegut, and Sister Simone Campbell. The most recent Ware Lecturer was Ibram X. Kendi.

Since a 2011 trial run, the General Assembly has allowed for remote online participation for congregations who are not able to send delegates in person, formally described as "off-site delegates". In 2020, due to COVID-19, all in-person programming initially scheduled to take place in Providence, Rhode Island were cancelled and moved to an online and remote format, resulting in the third-largest number of credentialed delegates in attendance behind the 2003 and 2007 General Assemblies. The 2021 iteration, initially pre-scheduled for Milwaukee, Wisconsin, was also moved to a virtual format. The 2022 General Assembly was held in a multi-platform format, with programming and participation in events occurring both in-person in Portland, Oregon and online.

The 2026 General Assembly is set to expand the multi-platform format, with an all-virtual business meeting followed by optional in-person gathering and virtual participation for programmatic events at several regional congregations serving as satellite locations, with livestreams being coordinated from the Galt House in Louisville, Kentucky. The 2027 General Assembly is set to return to a combination of in-person gathering in San Jose, California and online.

== Social Justice and Witness statements ==
Delegates of the General Assembly often passes a number of statements and guidances for social justice issues. Statements vary upon the description of weight for each statement:

- Statement of Conscience (SoC): An SoC is a statement which has been ratified by the General Assembly after three years of study and reflection (during which it remains in the stage of a Congregational Study/Action Issue (CSAI), with a fourth year dedicated to implementation). SoCs hold the weight of endorsement from the UUA at large.
- Action of Immediate Witness (AIW): An AIW is a statement which only holds the weight of endorsement by delegates for a single GA iteration.

== Actions ==
Actions taken at GA meetings have included the 1984 decision to approve religious blessing of same-sex marriages, making the UUA the first major church to have done so.

At the 2007 General Assembly the Unitarian Universalist Association announced the new five year Comprehensive Fundraising Campaign entitled: "Now Is The Time: A Campaign to Grow Our Faith". The campaign funds will support programs that will encourage growth of Unitarian Universalism as a whole. These programs fall under the following categories: Growing Our Numbers, Growing Our Diversity, Growing Our Witness, Growing Our Leadership, and Growing Our Spirit.

== Locations, themes and Ware Lecturers ==
Date	Location	Theme	Ware Lecturer
May 23–28, 1962	Washington, DC	"The Individual in a Mass Culture"	Walter Kaufmann
May 13–19, 1963	Chicago, IL	"The Free Church in a Changing World"	F.S.C. Northrop
May 9–16, 1964	San Francisco, CA	"The Greatest Experience..."	Linus Pauling
May 22–29, 1965	Boston, MA	"An Essential Past...An Unlimited Future"	Harry D. Gideonse
May 16–22, 1966	Hollywood, Florida	"Creative Use of Controversy"	Martin Luther King Jr.
May 1–6, 1967	Denver, Colorado	"Responding to a Revolutionary Age"	Saul Alinsky
May 23–30, 1968	Cleveland, Ohio	"Determining Our Priorities"	Carl B. Stokes
Jul 11-20, 1969	Boston, Massachusetts	"Encounter with Change"	Martin E. Marty, Bernard Delfgaauw, R. J. Werblowsky
June 29-July 4, 1970	Seattle, Washington	"Dynamics of Diversity"	Rollo May
June 25–30, 1979	East Lansing, Michigan	"A Time to Grow...to Everything There Is a Season"	Jesse Jackson
June 13–18, 1980	Albuquerque, New Mexico	"Touching Our Heritage...Enriching Our Tomorrows"	LaDonna Harris
June 12–18, 1981	Philadelphia, Pennsylvania	"An Urban Experience"	Vernon Jordan
June 21–26, 1982	Brunswick, Maine	"Coming of Age"	May Sarton
June 12–17, 1983	Vancouver, British Columbia	"L'Assemblee Generale"	Thomas R. Berger
June 25–30, 1984	Columbus, Ohio	"Being Human in an Age of Technology"	Helen Caldicott
June 17–22, 1985	Atlanta, Georgia	"Like the Phoenix Rising"	Shirley Chisholm
June 22–27, 1986	Rochester, New York	"Take Up the Song"	Kurt Vonnegut
June 22–27, 1987	Little Rock, Arkansas	"Faith of the Free"	Anthony Lewis
June 16–21, 1988	Palm Springs, California	"Touch the Earth... Reach the Sky"	Robert Coles
June 22–27, 1989	New Haven, Connecticut	"Bend Toward Justice"	Sissela Bok
June 21–26, 1990	Milwaukee, Wisconsin	"Sound the Chorus of Faith"	Schuyler Chapin
June 10–25, 1991	Hollywood, Florida	"Speak to the Earth and It Shall Teach Thee"	Elizabeth Dodson Gray
June 25–30, 1992	Calgary, Alberta	"Building the Global Village"	Mel Hurtig
June 24–29, 1993	Charlotte, North Carolina	"Universalism: For Such a Time as This"	Marian Wright Edelman
June 23–28, 1994	Fort Worth, Texas	"Facing Our New Frontiers"	Holland Hendrix
June 15–20, 1995	Spokane, Washington	"Building Our Future Generation by Generation"	Norman Lear
June 20–25, 1996	Indianapolis, Indiana	"The Future Is Now"	Sylvia Ann Hewlett
June 19–24, 1997	Phoenix, Arizona	"Building Interfaith Cooperation: Interfaith Action for a Just Community"	Joan Brown Campbell
June 25–30, 1998	Rochester, New York	"Fulfilling the Promise"	Amitai Etzioni
June 24–28, 1999	Salt Lake City, Utah	"Fulfilling the Promise: To Help One Another"	Mary Pipher
June 22–26, 2000	Nashville, Tennessee	"Fulfilling the Promise: Our Common Call"	Morris Dees
June 21–25, 2001	Cleveland, Ohio	"Fulfilling the Promise"	James A. Forbes
June 20–24, 2002	Quebec City, Quebec	N/A	Stephen Lewis
June 26–30, 2003	Boston, Massachusetts	N/A	Julian Bond
June 24–27, 2004	Long Beach, California	N/A	Holly Near
June 23–27, 2005	Fort Worth, Texas	"Ministering to Families in Today's World"	Elaine Pagels
June 21–25, 2006	St. Louis, Missouri	"Toward Right Relations"	Mary Oliver
June 20–24, 2007	Portland, Oregon	"Choices That Matter"	Rashid Khalidi
June 25–29, 2008	Fort Lauderdale, Florida	"Common Threads"	Van Jones
June 24–28, 2009	Salt Lake City, Utah		Melissa Harris-Lacewell
June 23–27, 2010	Minneapolis, Minnesota		Winona LaDuke
June 22–26, 2011	Charlotte, North Carolina		Karen Armstrong
June 20–24, 2012	Phoenix, Arizona	"Justice GA"	Maria Hinojosa
June 19–23, 2013	Louisville, Kentucky	"From Promise to Commitment"	Eboo Patel
June 25–29, 2014	Providence, Rhode Island	"Love Reaches Out"	Simone Campbell
June 24–28, 2015	Portland, Oregon	"Building a New Way"	Cornel West
June 22–26, 2016	Columbus, Ohio	"Heart Land: Where Faiths Connect"	Krista Tippett
June 21–25, 2017	New Orleans, Louisiana	"Resist and Rejoice"	Bryan Stevenson
June 20–24, 2018	Kansas City, Missouri	"All Are Called"	Brittany Packnett
June 19–23, 2019	Spokane, Washington	"The Power of We"	Richard Blanco
June 14–28, 2020	Virtual (COVID-19; initially scheduled for Providence, Rhode Island)	"Rooted, Inspired, & Ready!"	Naomi Klein
June 23–27, 2021	Virtual (COVID-19; initially scheduled for Milwaukee, Wisconsin)	"Circle 'Round for Justice ● Healing ● Courage"	Stacey Abrams and Desmond Meade
June 22–26, 2022	Portland, Oregon and Virtual (multi-platform)	"Meet the Moment: Reimagining Radical Faith Community"	Ibram X. Kendi
June 21–25, 2023	Pittsburgh, Pennsylvania and Virtual (multi-platform)	"Faithfully Becoming"	Imani Perry
June 20–23, 2024	Virtual	"Love Unites, Stories Ignite"	Julia Watts Belser
June 18–22, 2025	Baltimore, Maryland and Virtual (multi-platform)	"Meet the Moment"	Imara Jones
June 14–21, 2026*	Virtual business meeting followed by optional in-person gatherings	"Together Everywhere"	Mariann Budde
June 23–27, 2027*	San Jose, California and Virtual (multi-platform)	TBD	TBD
*Future General Assemblies
