= Unitarian Universalist Association =

Liberal religious association of congregations

- Abbreviation: UUA
- Classification: Inclusivist Liberal, UU
- Orientation: Unitarian Universalist (Radical Protestant and Restorationist merger)
- Scripture: no official sacred text
- Theology: Egalitarian (including Liberal Pluralist, Liberationist, Mainline Protestant, Omnist, and Syncretic)
- Polity: Congregational
- President: Sofía Betancourt
- Region: North America
- Headquarters: 24 Farnsworth Street, Boston, Massachusetts, U.S.
- Origin: May 15, 1961; 65 years ago
- Merger of: American Unitarian Association and Universalist Church of America
- Congregations: 1,000
- Members: 152,958 members and religious education enrollees (2024)
- Publications: UU World
- Official website: www.uua.org
- Logo

The Unitarian Universalist Association (UUA) is a liberal religious association of Unitarian Universalist congregations. It was formed in 1961 by the consolidation of the American Unitarian Association and the Universalist Church of America. Current Unitarian Universalism in the UUA has progressed beyond its historic roots in Radical Protestant and Christian primitivist movements, being defined as non-creedal and drawing syncretic wisdom from various religions and philosophies. Non-Christian influences and religious identities in contemporary Unitarian Universalism include humanism, nontheism, pantheism, Hinduism, Buddhism, Taoism, Judaism, Islam, and Earth-centered spirituality (and many Unitarian Universalists identify as dual faith, i.e. UU and Christian, UU and Buddhist, UU and Jewish, etc.). Thus, the UUA is a religious group with liberal leanings.

In the United States, Unitarian Universalism grew by 15.8% between 2000 and 2010 to include 211,000 adherents nationwide. As of 2024, there are 152,958 members and religious education enrollees (which is around 9% of American UUs) in the UUA. The UUA was one of the seventeen members of the now defunct International Council of Unitarians and Universalists (1995–2021).

== Congregations ==
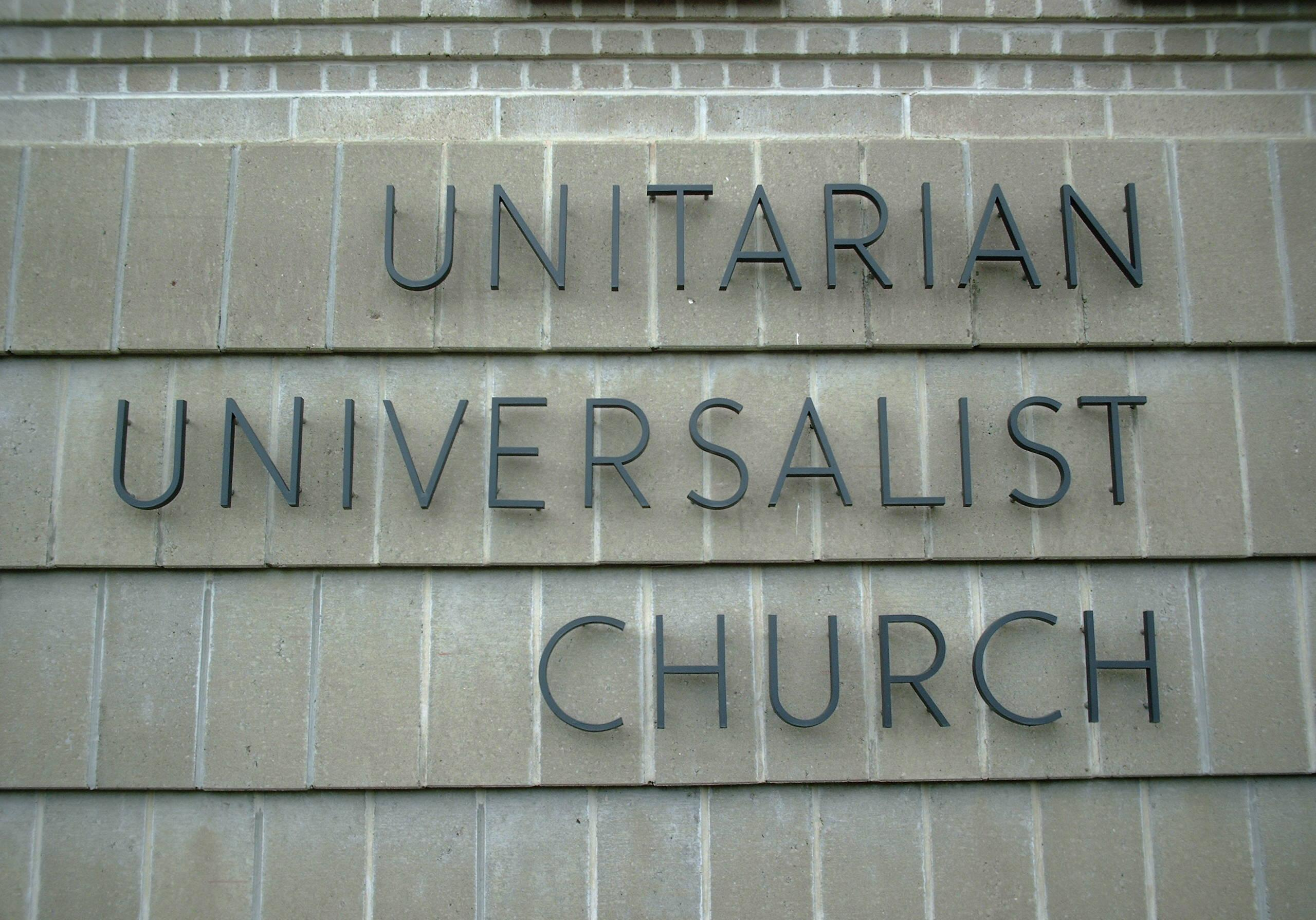
Sign on a UU church in Rochester, Minnesota, United States

Most of the member congregations of the UUA are in the United States and Canada, but the UUA has also admitted congregations from Australia, New Zealand, the Philippines and Pakistan. In recent times, UUA policy is for new congregations from outside the USA to form their own national bodies and having these bodies join the International Council of Unitarians and Universalists or, after the ICUU dissolution in 2021, its successor organization. Until 2002, almost all member congregations of the Canadian Unitarian Council (CUC) were also members of the UUA and most services to CUC member congregations were provided by the UUA. However, after an agreement between the UUA and the CUC, since 2002 most services have been provided by the CUC to its own member congregations, with the UUA continuing to provide ministerial settlement services. Since 2002, some Canadian congregations have continued to be members of both the UUA and CUC while others are members of only the CUC.

The Church of the Larger Fellowship (CLF) is a member church of the Unitarian Universalist Association providing denominational services to persons unable to attend a physical congregation because of distance or mobility, or who wish to belong to a congregation other than their local congregation. Many of these are Unitarian Universalists in other countries, members of the military, prisoners or non-mobile elderly.

== Organization ==
Old UUA logo

The Unitarian Universalist Association is headquartered at 24 Farnsworth Street, Boston, Massachusetts. This serves as the historical center of Unitarianism in the U.S. As of 2009, the UUA comprised 19 Districts, 1,041 congregations with 164,656 certified members and 61,795 church school enrollees served by 1,623 ministers. However, as of 2011 the UUA had 162,796 certified members and 54,671 church school enrollees. This shows a decline of 1,860 members and 7,124 enrollees in church school since 2008. The UUA has, for the first time, also reported decline in average weekly attendance to 100,693 people. This is a drop of 1.5% on the 2010 reported figure. Many atheists and humanists are also a part of the various congregations of the Unitarian Universalist Association.

=== Corporate status ===
The UUA was given corporate status in May 1961 under special acts of legislature of the Commonwealth of Massachusetts and the State of New York. See Chapter 148 of the acts of 1960 of the Massachusetts legislature and Chapter 827 of the Acts of 1960 of the New York legislature. Copies of said acts are attached to the minutes of the organizing meeting of the association held in Boston, Massachusetts, in May 1961 and also are printed in the 1961–62 directory of the association.

=== Decentralized association ===
The UUA is not a denomination in the traditional sense; the UUA is an association of congregations with no one organization able to speak authoritatively for the whole. It is the congregations that have authority over the larger body, through the annual General Assembly of the Unitarian Universalist Association. Since the general public understands denomination much more readily than association of congregations, the distinction is generally omitted in conversation. Because of this relationship between the congregations and the association, Unitarian Universalist congregations have a congregationalist polity of governance. However, day-to-day decisions are made by the president, the moderator, and the board of trustees.

In its role as a national organization representing the congregations, the UUA is a member of various organizations, both religious and secular.

=== Covenant of Values ===
Members of the UUA covenanted together via the seven Principles and Purposes, a part of Article II of the UUA bylaws. These Principles and Purposes were statements of shared values that Unitarian Universalist congregations agreed to uphold:

1. The inherent worth and dignity of every person;
2. Justice, equity and compassion in human relations;
3. Acceptance of one another and encouragement to spiritual growth in our congregations;
4. A free and responsible search for truth and meaning;
5. The right of conscience and the use of the democratic process within our congregations and in society at large;
6. The goal of world community with peace, liberty, and justice for all;
7. Respect for the interdependent web of all existence of which we are a part.

These principles, first adopted in 1960 and later revised in 1984 and 1985, proved so popular that many Unitarian Universalists came to see them as a wisdom source in and of themselves and a guide for participation in Unitarian Universalist congregations.

In June, 2024, the UUA General Assembly voted to replace the 7 principles in Article II of the UUA bylaws with a new covenant of 7 values. The central value is love. The other 6 are: interdependence, equity, transformation, pluralism, generosity, and justice.

=== General Assembly ===
General Assembly (GA) is held every year in June in a different city in the USA. Member congregations (and three associate member organizations) send delegates and conventioneers to participate in the plenary sessions, workshops, district gatherings, and worship services.

=== Finances and membership fees ===
The UUA requests annual contributions from its member congregations. The requested contribution, known as Fair Share, is calculated for each congregation by multiplying an annually determined membership fee times the number of registered members of that congregation. The UUA also has alternative modes of raising funds. In order for congregations to participate in certain programming, they will pay a nominal fee. Some funds are earned through charitable gifts or estate planning. Additionally, the UUA pools together investment funds from congregations or other constituents and manages them for a small percentage.

=== Alternate growth strategies ===
UUA leaders concerned with membership numbers fluctuating from barely perceptible growth to slight decline, are working with a variety of experimental UU communities that represent alternative models of congregational formation—or that may point to new forms of affiliation.

== Related organizations ==
Two non-congregational organizations belong to the UUA as Associate Member organizations. Associate Member organizations are esteemed as inherently integral to the work of the UUA and its member congregations, and are accorded two voting delegates each to the annual General Assembly. The Associate Member organizations are the Unitarian Universalist Service Committee (UUSC), which is active in social change actions, and the Unitarian Universalist Women's Federation, which provides education and advocacy on women's issues. The Unitarian Universalist United Nations Office, which is a center of information and action at the United Nations, was an Associate Member organization until it became an office within the UUA in 2011.

The UUA also recognizes many organizations as Independent Affiliate organizations. These organizations are created by Unitarian Universalists as needed to meet the special needs of the diversity within Unitarian Universalism. These groups may provide specialized spiritual support, work for specific social justice issues, provide support for religious professionals, etc.

The UUA owns Beacon Press, a nationally known publisher of both fiction and non-fiction books. Skinner House Books publishes books primarily of interest to Unitarian Universalists.

The UUA also participates in interfaith organizations such as the Interfaith Center on Corporate Responsibility.

== Governance ==
The UUA is governed by delegates elected to the annual General Assembly. GA delegates elect the president, the moderator, and members of the board of trustees.

From when the association was established in 1961 until 2010, the president and moderator were each elected to four-year terms by delegates at General Assembly. An individual could not be elected to more than two successive terms. Candidates ran by petition. The 2010 General Assembly adopted a bylaw amendment, to take effect in stages beginning in 2013, making changes in the composition of the board of trustees and in the terms and election procedures for president and moderator. Under the new system, the president and moderator are each limited to a single term of six years. A Presidential Search Committee nominates candidates for president. The board of trustees nominates candidates for moderator. Individuals who are not nominated by the committee or the board may run by petition. The 2010 amendment also reduced the size of the board of trustees and changed the election process so that all trustees are elected by General Assembly. (The prior board consisted of one trustee elected by each UUA district and several at-large trustees elected by General Assembly.)

=== President ===
The president of the UUA is its CEO and the religious leader of Unitarian Universalism in the United States. A former UUA president is Rev. Susan Frederick-Gray, who was elected at the 2017 UUA General Assembly in New Orleans, Louisiana; she was expected to be the first president to serve a single six-year term, per a 2010 bylaw change. Frederick-Gray was the first woman to be elected as president of the UUA. As of October 2023, the president is Rev. Dr. Sofía Betancourt. She is the first woman of color and openly queer person to be elected to the office.

Name	Elected
Rev. Dana McLean Greeley	1961
Rev. Robert West	1969
Rev. Paul Carnes	1977
Rev. O. Eugene Pickett	1979 (Note: Rev. Pickett was elected president by the Board of Trustees upon the death of Rev. Paul Carnes. He was subsequently elected to a four-year term by the General Assembly.)
Rev. William Schulz	1985
Rev. John A. Buehrens	1993
Rev. William G. Sinkford	2001
Rev. Peter Morales	2009
Rev. Dr. Sofía Betancourt, Dr. Leon Spencer, Rev. William G. Sinkford (interim co-presidents)	2017 (Note: Following Rev. Peter Morales' resignation on April 1, 2017, the Board of Trustees appointed three co-presidents to serve as a transition team until Rev. Frederick-Gray's election on June 24, 2017.)
Rev. Susan Frederick-Gray	2017
Rev. Dr. Sofía Betancourt	2023

=== Moderator and co-moderators ===
The moderator of the UUA is the chair of the Board of Trustees and is the presiding officer at General Assembly. The moderator is the highest UUA position traditionally held by laity.

Moderator Jim Key was elected for a six-year term at General Assembly in 2013. Due to "significant health concerns", Key resigned from office on May 13, 2017, less than a month before his death. Because of the amount of work needed for the moderator position, in 2017, the position was split into two co-moderator positions. In August 2017, Mr. Barb Greve and Elandria Williams were appointed to serve as Interim Co-Moderators until a special election for Moderator can be held at the 2018 General Assembly, where they were elected as co-moderators. In 2020, Rev. Meg Riley was elected as co-moderator, the first minister to serve as moderator of the UUA.

Name	Elected
Marshall E. Dimock	1961
Joseph L. Fisher	1964 (Note: Fisher was elected moderator by the Board of Trustees upon the resignations of his predecessor and subsequently elected by General Assembly to a full four-year term.)
Sandra M. Caron	1977
Natalie Gulbrandsen	1985
Denise Davidoff	1993
Diane Olson	2001
Gini Courter	2003 (Note: Courter was elected moderator by the Board of Trustees upon the resignations of her predecessor and subsequently elected by General Assembly to a full four-year term.)
Jim Key	2013 (Note: Citing "significant health concerns", Jim Key resigned from office on May 13, 2017, less than a month before his death. Vice-Moderator Denise Rimes led the Board of Trustees as interim moderator from May to August 2017. In August 2017, Mr. Barb Greve and Elandria Williams were appointed to serve as Interim Co-Moderators until a special election for Moderator can be held at the 2018 General Assembly, where they were elected co-moderators.)
Denise Rimes (interim moderator)	2017
Mr. Barb Greve and Elandria Williams	2017 (as interim co-moderators); 2018 (as co-moderators)
Rev. Meg Riley and Charles Du Mond	2020

== Boy Scouts of America controversy ==
The Religion in Life religious emblems program of UUA were once unrecognized by the Boy Scouts of America (BSA). The UUA published statements opposing the BSA's policies on homosexuals, atheists, and agnostics in 1992; and in 1993, the UUA updated Religion in Life to include criticism of these BSA policies. In 1998, the BSA withdrew recognition of Religion in Life, stating that such information was incompatible with BSA programs. The UUA removed the material from their curriculum and the BSA renewed their recognition of the program. When the BSA found that the UUA was issuing supplemental material with the Religion in Life workbooks that included statements critical of discrimination on the basis of sexual orientation or personal religious viewpoint, the BSA again withdrew recognition.

The Unitarian Universalist Scouters Organization (UUSO) created the Living Your Religion program in 2004 as a parallel award for Unitarian Universalist youth. The program was approved by the BSA Religious Relationships committee in 2005 and was promoted at the 2005 National Scout Jamboree as well as at the following jamborees in 2010 and 2013. The UUA stated that the UUSO was not recognized as an affiliate organization despite the stated UUSO goal to create a set of awards that are recognized by the UUA and BSA. In 2013, BSA opened membership to gay youth, followed by opening membership to gay adults in 2015; this policy change resolved the main UUA objection to supporting BSA and by December 2015, the UUSO had self-dissolved and the UUA religious emblems programs were again recognized by BSA.

=== Alternative UU-friendly scouting organizations ===
In the wake of this controversy, a number of SpiralScouts International circles and dozens of Navigators USA Chapters have formed within congregations of the UUA, despite having no official affiliation with the UUA.

Navigators USA, was founded by volunteers of All Souls Unitarian Church in New York City after terminating its charter with Boy Scout Troop 103 because of the BSA policies. Its founders describe as "...committed to providing a quality scouting experience that is inclusive and available to all children and families regardless of gender, race, religion, economic status, sexual orientation and social background." There are currently 120 chapters in the United States, plus a number in the UK, France, and Kenya.

In addition to SpiralScouts and Navigators USA, the UUA website also suggests Camp Fire as an alternative scout-like organization that comports with UU principles.

== See also ==
- Evensong (Unitarian Universalist Association)
- New religious movement
- Unitarian Universalism
- United and uniting churches
