= Unitarianism =

Nontrinitarian sect of Christianity

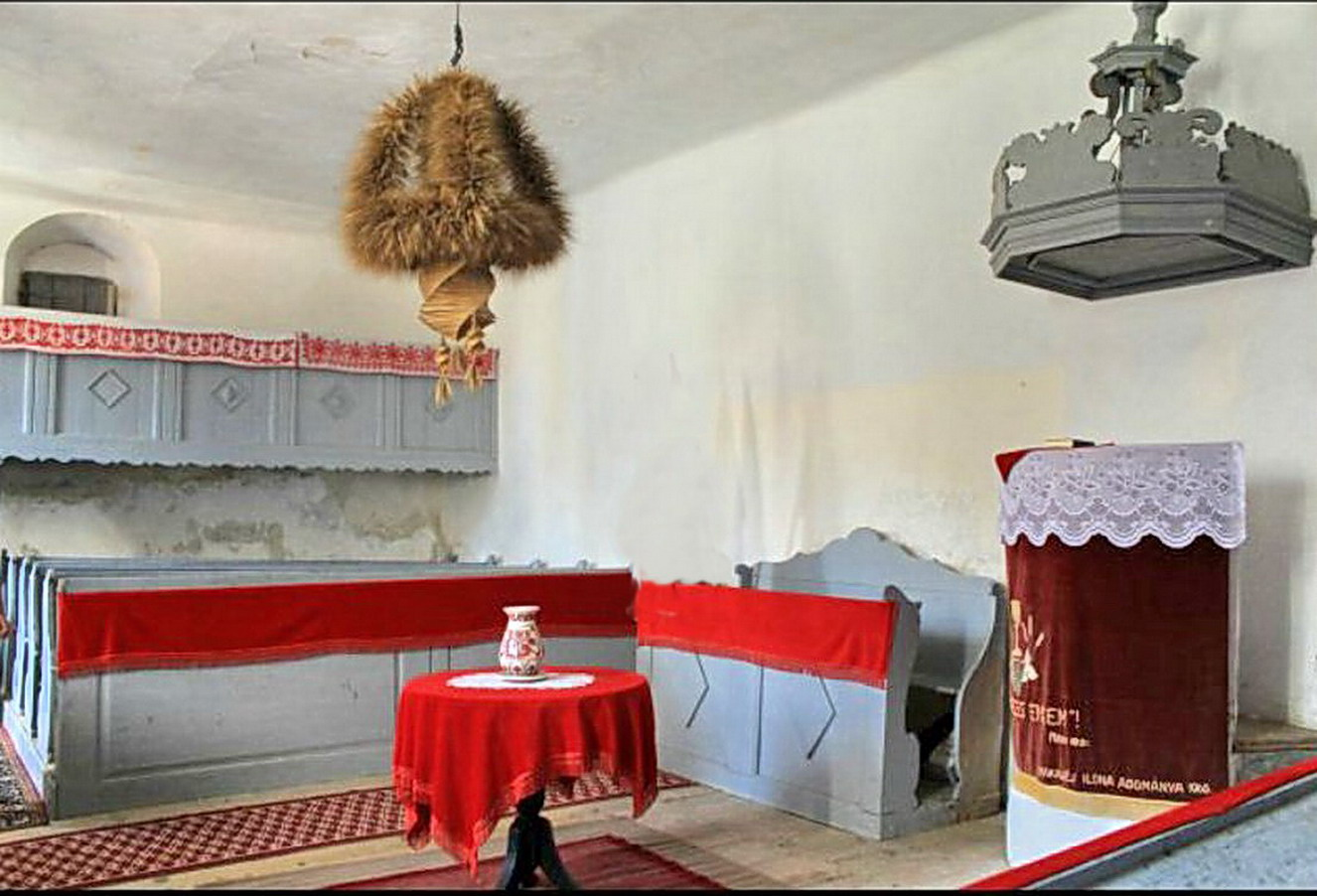
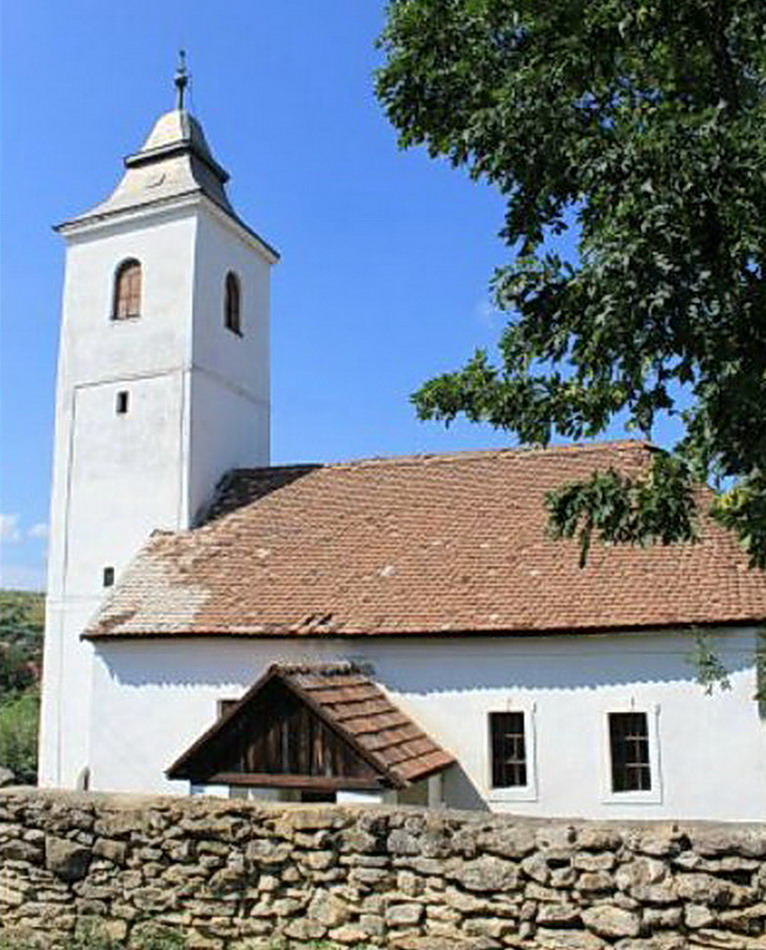
A view of the pulpit and communion table at the Unitarian Christian Church in Săndulești, Romania (top photograph), as well as the view of the exterior of the church (bottom photograph)

Unitarianism is a nontrinitarian movement of Christianity, which affirms the unitary nature of God as the singular and unique creator of the universe. Unitarian theology critiques the traditional Christian theology of the Trinity, which regards God as being one divine essence, but three distinct persons — God The Father, God The Son (i.e., Jesus Christ), and God The Spirit (i.e., the Holy Spirit). Unitarians view this understanding of God as a later theological corruption, and they embrace a view of God as a singular, unified entity; in most Unitarian theological interpretations, Jesus Christ retains highest respect as a spiritual and moral teacher of unparalleled insight and sensitivity, with his divine nature as the Son of God being subordinate to the Creator God.

Many Unitarians believe that Jesus Christ was inspired by God in his moral teachings and that he is the savior of mankind, and the exalted Son of God, but he is not equal to God himself. Accordingly, Unitarians reject the Ecumenical Councils and ecumenical creeds, and sit outside traditional, mainstream Christianity. Unitarianism was established in order to restore "primitive Christianity before later corruptions set in". Likewise, Unitarian Christians generally reject the doctrine of original sin. The churchmanship of Unitarianism may include liberal denominations or Unitarian Christian denominations that are more conservative, with the latter being known as biblical Unitarians.

The birth of the Unitarian faith is proximate to the Radical Reformation, beginning almost simultaneously among the Protestant Polish Brethren in the Polish–Lithuanian Commonwealth and in the Principality of Transylvania in the mid-16th century. The first Unitarian Christian denomination known to have emerged during that time was the Unitarian Church of Transylvania, founded by the Unitarian preacher and theologian Ferenc Dávid (c. 1520 – 1579). Among its adherents were a significant number of Italians who took refuge in Bohemia, Moravia, Poland, and Transylvania in order to escape from the religious persecution perpetrated against them by the Roman Catholic and Magisterial Protestant churches.

The early Unitarian Christian leader Demeter Hunyadi led the effort to catechize the faithful. The first Unitarian Christian confession of faith was the Consensus Ministrorum, which holds to a Unitarian view of God and teaches that Jesus Christ should be adored; the confession of faith titled the Complanatio (1638) established the necessity of the sacraments of infant baptism and reception of the eucharist. The widely used Racovian Catechism (1605) of the Polish Brethren explicated the Unitarian Christian faith from a Socinian perspective, supporting its doctrine with proof-texts from the Bible.

In the 17th century, significant repression in Poland led many Unitarians to flee or be killed for their faith. From the 16th to 18th centuries, Unitarians in Britain often faced significant political persecution, including John Biddle and Theophilus Lindsey. In England, the first Unitarian Church was established in 1774 on Essex Street, London, where today's British Unitarian headquarters is still located.

As is typical of dissenters and nonconformists, Unitarianism does not constitute one single Christian denomination; rather, it refers to a collection of both existing and extinct Christian groups (whether historically related to each other or not) that share a common theological concept of the unitary nature of God. Unitarian Christian communities and churches have developed in Central Europe (mostly Romania and Hungary), Ireland, India, Jamaica, Japan, Canada, Nigeria, South Africa, the United Kingdom, and the United States. In British America, different schools of Unitarian theology first spread in the New England Colonies and subsequently in the Mid-Atlantic States. The first official acceptance of the Unitarian faith on the part of a congregation in North America was by King's Chapel in Boston, from where James Freeman began teaching Unitarian doctrine in 1784 and was appointed rector. Later in 1785, he created a revised Unitarian Book of Common Prayer based on Lindsey's work.

== Terminology ==
Unitarianism is a proper noun and follows the same English usage as other Christian theologies that have developed within a religious group or denomination (such as Calvinism, Anabaptism, Adventism, Lutheranism, Wesleyanism, etc.). The term existed shortly before it became the name of a distinct religious tradition, thus occasionally it is used as a common noun to describe any understanding of Jesus Christ that denies the doctrine of the Trinity or affirms the belief that God is only one person. In that case, it would be a Nontrinitarian belief system not necessarily associated with the Unitarian movement. For example, the Unitarian movement has never accepted the Godhood of Jesus, and therefore does not include those nontrinitarian belief systems that do, such as Oneness Pentecostalism, United Pentecostal Church International, the True Jesus Church, and the writings of Michael Servetus (all of which maintain that Jesus is God as a single person).

Unitarianism is a Christian theology and practice that precedes and is distinct from Unitarian Universalism. In the 1890s the American Unitarian Association began to allow non-Christian and non-theistic churches and individuals to be part of their fellowship. As a result, people who held no Unitarian belief began to be called Unitarians because they were members of churches that belonged to the American Unitarian Association. After several decades, the non-theistic members outnumbered the theological Unitarians.

== History ==
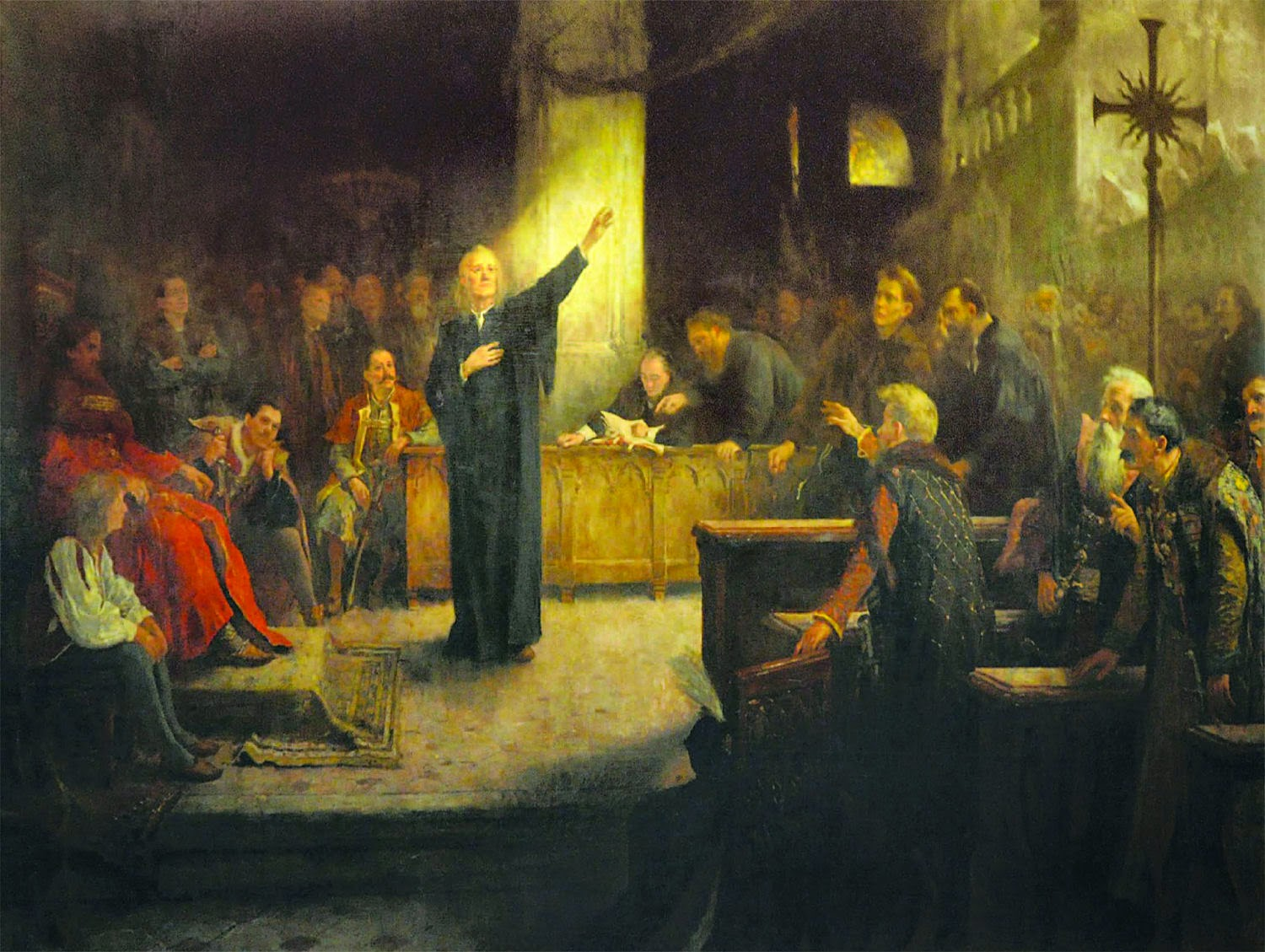
Ferenc Dávid holding his speech at the Diet of Torda (1568), in the Kingdom of Hungary (today Turda, Romania). Painting by Aladár Körösfői-Kriesch (1896).

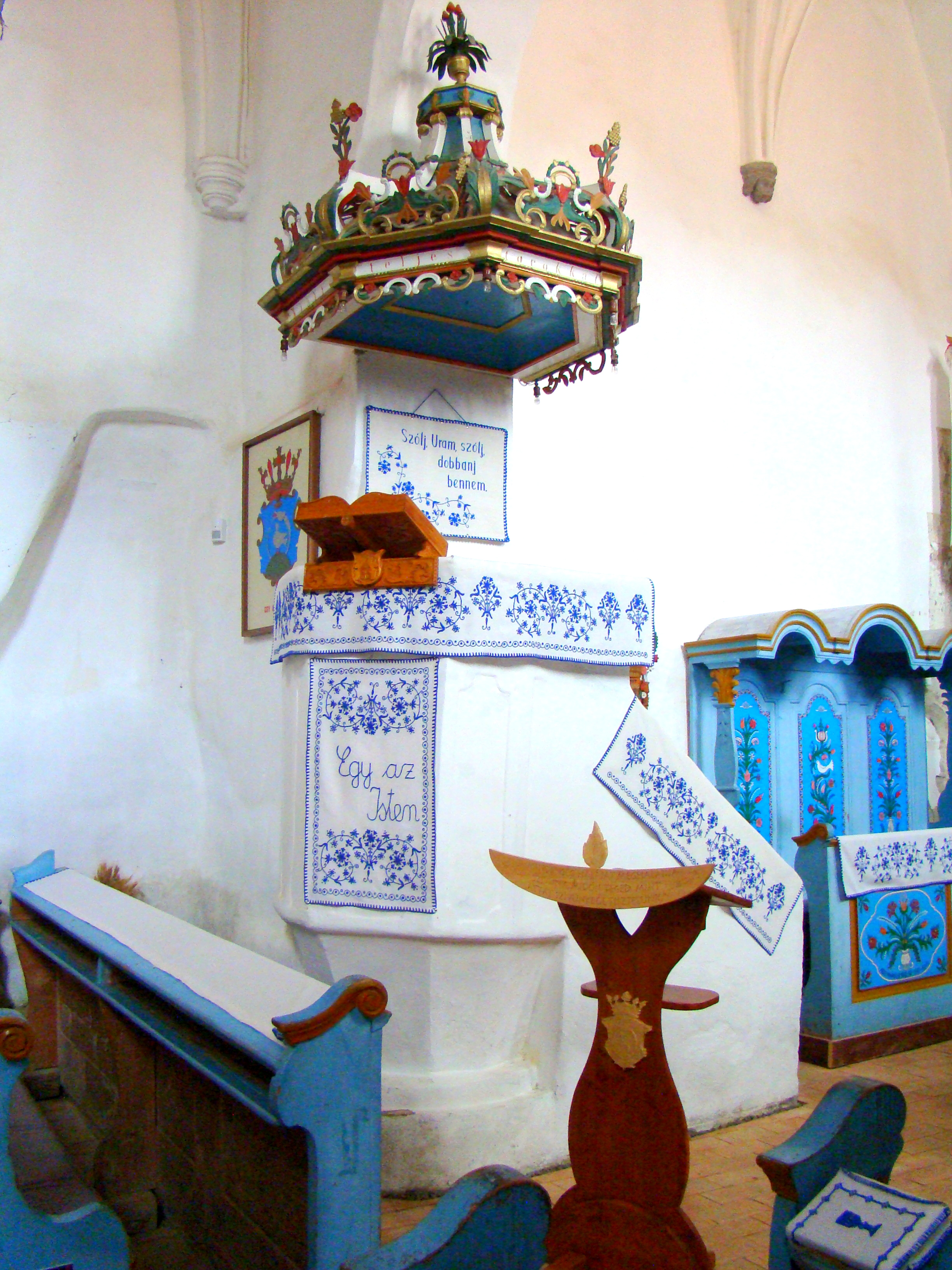
The pulpit of the Unitarian Christian Church in Dârjiu, Romania. Its prominent position in the church is characteristic of Unitarian Christian church furnishings.

Unitarianism, both as a theology and as a denominational family of churches, was defined and developed in Poland, Transylvania, England, Wales, India, Japan, Jamaica, the United States, and beyond in the 16th century through the present. Although common beliefs existed among Unitarians in each of these regions, they initially grew independently from each other. Only later did they influence one another and accumulate more similarities.

The Ecclesia minor or Minor Reformed Church of Poland, better known today as the Polish Brethren, was born as the result of a controversy that started on January 22, 1556, when Piotr of Goniądz (Peter Gonesius), a Polish student, spoke out against the doctrine of the Trinity during the general synod of the Reformed (Calvinist) churches of Poland held in the village of Secemin. After nine years of debate, in 1565, the anti-Trinitarians were excluded from the existing synod of the Polish Reformed Church (henceforth the Ecclesia maior) and they began to hold their own synods as the Ecclesia minor. Though frequently called "Arians" by those on the outside, the views of Fausto Sozzini (Faustus Socinus) became the standard in the church, and these doctrines were quite removed from Arianism. So important was Socinus to the formulation of their beliefs that those outside Poland usually referred to them as Socinians. The Polish Brethren were disbanded in 1658 by the Sejm (Polish Parliament). They were ordered to convert to Roman Catholicism or leave Poland. Most of them went to Transylvania or Holland, where they embraced the name "Unitarian". Between 1665 and 1668 a grandson of Socinus, Andrzej Wiszowaty Sr., published Bibliotheca Fratrum Polonorum quos Unitarios vocant (Library of the Polish Brethren who are called Unitarians 4 vols. 1665–1669).

The Unitarian Church of Transylvania was first recognized by the Edict of Torda, issued by the Transylvanian Diet under Prince John II Sigismund Zápolya (January 1568), and was first led by Ferenc Dávid (a former Reformed bishop, who had begun preaching the new doctrine in 1566). The term "Unitarian" first appeared as unitaria religio in a document of the Diet of Lécfalva, Transylvania, on 25 October 1600, though it was not widely used in Transylvania until 1638, when the formal recepta Unitaria Religio was published. The early Unitarian Christian leader Demeter Hunyadi led the effort to catechize the faithful. The first Unitarian Christian confession of faith was the Consensus Ministrorum, which holds to a Unitarian view of God and teaches that Jesus Christ should be adored; the confession of faith titled the Complanatio (1638) established the necessity of the sacraments of infant baptism and reception of the eucharist. The widely used Racovian Catechism (1605) of the Polish Brethren explicated the Unitarian Christian faith from a Socinian perspective, supporting its doctrine with proof-texts from the Bible.

Churches in the Unitarian Christian tradition featured prominent pulpits for the preaching of the Bible; they contained wooden communion tables for the celebration of the Lord's Supper, in contrast to the altars of Evangelical-Lutheran and Roman Catholic churches. In describing the interior of Unitarian Christian churches, the historian Andrew Spicer states: "The pulpit was located opposite the entrance and the hexagonal wooden communion table was placed at its foot. Together they created the focal point of the liturgical space, as can be seen at Rimetea and Colțești (Torockószentgyörgy)."

The word Unitarian had been circulating in private letters in England, in reference to imported copies of such publications as the Library of the Polish Brethren who are called Unitarians (1665). Henry Hedworth was the first to use the word "Unitarian" in print in English (1673), and the word first appears in a title in Stephen Nye's A Brief History of the Unitarians, called also Socinians (1687). The movement gained popularity in England in the wake of the Enlightenment and began to become a formal denomination in 1774 when Theophilus Lindsey organised meetings with Joseph Priestley, founding the first avowedly Unitarian congregation in the country. This occurred at Essex Street Church in London. Official toleration came in 1813.

The first official acceptance of the Unitarian faith on the part of a congregation in America was by King's Chapel in Boston, which settled James Freeman (1759–1835) in 1782, and revised the Prayer Book into a mild Unitarian liturgy in 1785. In 1800, Joseph Stevens Buckminster became minister of the Brattle Street Church in Boston, where his brilliant sermons, literary activities, and academic attention to the German "New Criticism" helped shape the subsequent growth of Unitarianism in New England. Unitarian Henry Ware (1764–1845) was appointed as the Hollis professor of divinity at Harvard College, in 1805. Harvard Divinity School then shifted from its conservative roots to teach Unitarian theology (see Harvard and Unitarianism). Buckminster's close associate William Ellery Channing (1780–1842) was settled over the Federal Street Church in Boston, 1803, and in a few years he became the leader of the Unitarian movement. A theological battle with the Congregational Churches resulted in the formation of the American Unitarian Association at Boston in 1825. Certainly, the unitarian theology was being "adopted" by the Congregationalists from the 1820s onwards. This movement is also evident in England at this time.

The first school founded by the Unitarians in the United States was the Clinton Liberal Institute, in Clinton, Oneida County, New York, founded in 1831.

== Beliefs ==
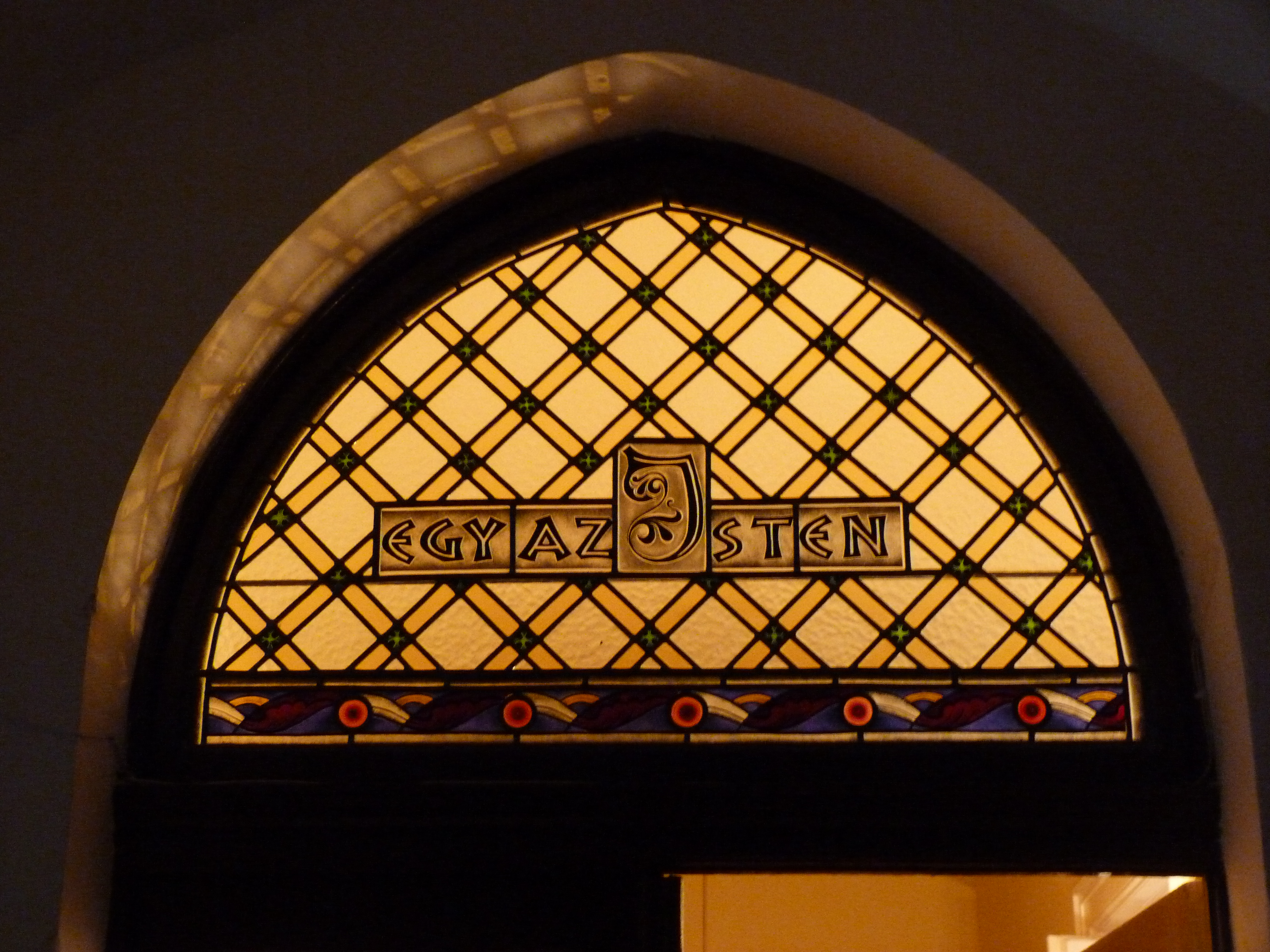
"God is One" (Egy az Isten) stained glass window in a Unitarian church in Budapest, Hungary

=== Christology ===
Unitarians charge that the doctrine of the Trinity fails to adhere to strict monotheism. Unitarians maintain that Jesus was a great man and a prophet of God—perhaps even a supernatural being—but not God himself. They believe Jesus did not claim to be God and that his teachings did not suggest the existence of a triune God.

Unitarian Christology can be divided according to whether or not Jesus is believed to have had a pre-human existence. Both forms maintain that God is one being and one person and that Jesus is the (or a) Son of God, but generally not God himself.

In the early 19th century, Unitarian Robert Wallace identified three particular classes of Unitarian doctrines in history:

- Arian, which believed in a pre-existence of the Logos;
- Socinian, which denied his pre-existence but agreed that Jesus should be worshipped;
- "Strict Unitarian", which, believing in an "incommunicable divinity of God", denied the worship of "the man Christ."

Unitarianism is considered a factor in the decline of classical deism because believers increasingly preferred to identify themselves as Unitarians rather than deists.

==== Socinian Christology ====
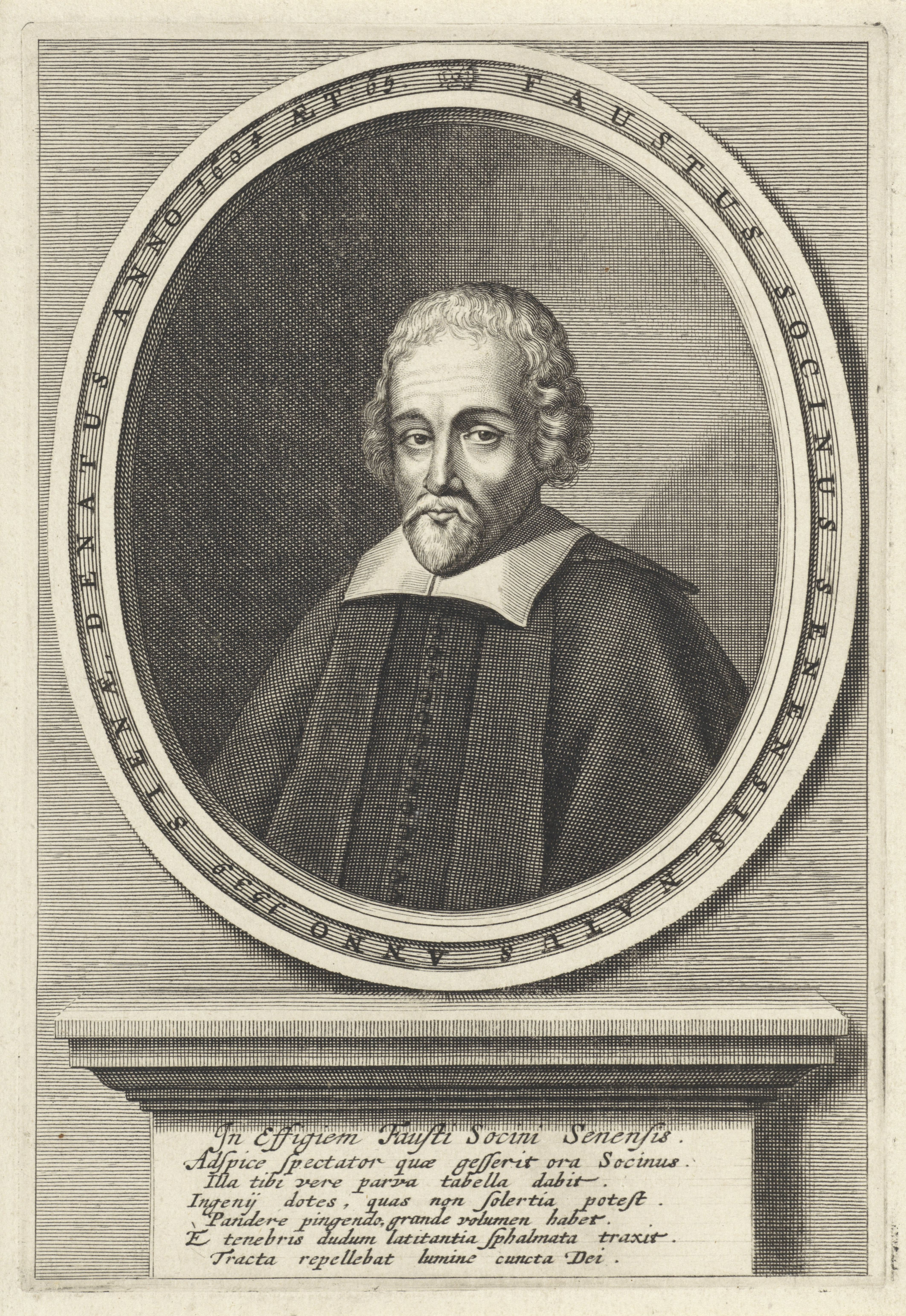
Fausto Sozzini was an Italian theologian who helped define Unitarianism and also served the Polish Brethren church.

The Christology commonly called "Socinian"—after Fausto Sozzini, one of the founders of Unitarian theology—refers to the belief that Jesus began his life when he was born as a human. In other words, the teaching that Jesus pre-existed his human body is rejected. The Racovian Catechism (1605) of the Polish Brethren explicated the Unitarian Christian faith from a Socinian perspective, supporting its doctrines with proof-texts from the Bible.

There are various views ranging from the belief that Jesus was simply a human (psilanthropism) who, because of his greatness, was adopted by God as his Son (adoptionism) to the belief that Jesus literally became the son of God when he was conceived by the Holy Spirit. (Note: The biblical narrative of Jesus' conception by the Holy Spirit is primarily found in the Gospel of Luke (1:26-38) and Matthew (1:18-25). In Luke, the angel Gabriel tells Mary she will conceive through the Holy Spirit, and in Matthew, the angel explains to Joseph that the child conceived in Mary is of the Holy Spirit.)

This Christology existed in some form or another before Sozzini. Theodotus of Byzantium, Artemon and Paul of Samosata denied the pre-existence of the Christ. These ideas were continued by Marcellus of Ancyra and his pupil Photinus in the 4th century AD. In the Radical Reformation and Anabaptist movements of the 16th century, this idea resurfaced with Sozzini's uncle, Lelio Sozzini. Having influenced the Polish Brethren to a formal declaration of this belief in the Racovian Catechism, Sozzini involuntarily ended up giving his name to this Christological position, which continued with English Unitarians, such as John Biddle, Thomas Belsham, Theophilus Lindsey, and James Martineau. In America, most of the early Unitarians were Arian in Christology (see below), but among those who held to a "Socinian" view was James Freeman.

Regarding the virgin birth of Jesus, among those who denied the preexistence of the Christ, some held to it, and others did not. Its denial is sometimes ascribed to the Ebionites; however, Origen (Contra Celsum volume 61) and Eusebius (HE iii.27) both indicate that some Ebionites did accept the virgin birth. On the other hand, Theodotus of Byzantium, Artemon, and Paul of Samosata all accepted the virgin birth. In the early days of Unitarianism, the stories of the virgin birth were accepted by most. There were a number of Unitarians who questioned the historicity of the Bible, including Symon Budny, Jacob Palaeologus, Thomas Belsham, and Richard Wright, and this made them question the virgin birth story. Beginning in England and America in the 1830s and manifesting itself primarily in transcendentalist Unitarianism, which emerged from the German liberal theology associated primarily with Friedrich Schleiermacher, the psilanthropist view increased in popularity. Its proponents took an intellectual and humanistic approach to religion. They embraced evolutionary concepts, asserted the "inherent goodness of man", and abandoned the doctrine of biblical infallibility, rejecting most of the miraculous events in the Christian Bible (including the virgin birth). Notable examples are James Martineau, Theodore Parker, Ralph Waldo Emerson and Frederic Henry Hedge. Famous American Unitarian William Ellery Channing was a believer in the virgin birth until later in his life, after he had begun his association with the Transcendentalists.

==== Arianism ====
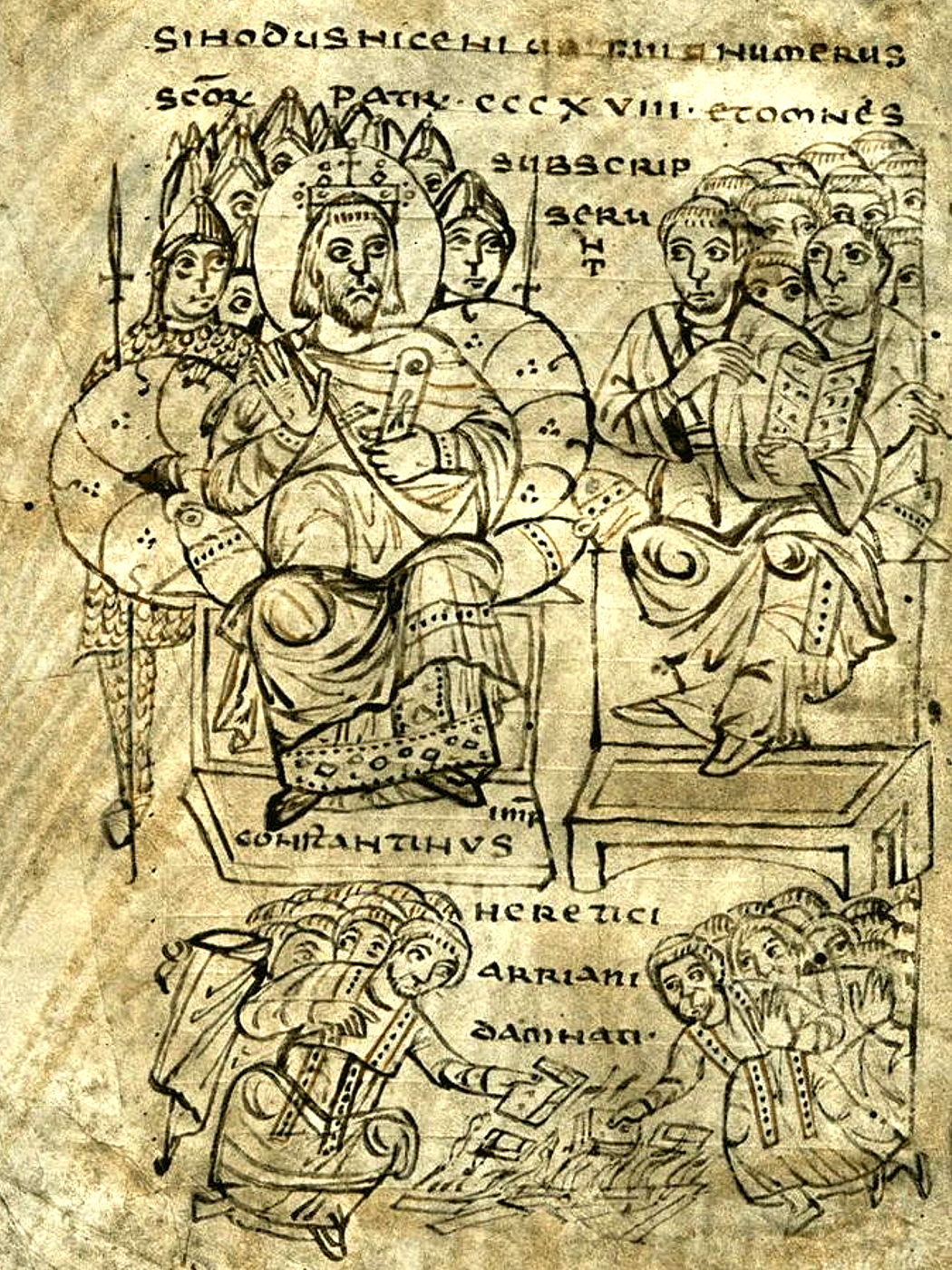
Constantine I burning Arian books, illustration from a book of canon law, c. 825

Arianism is often considered a form of Unitarianism.

The Christology of Arianism holds that Jesus, before his human life, existed as the Logos (Word), a being begotten or created by God, who dwelt with God in Heaven. There are many varieties of this form of Unitarianism, ranging from the belief that the Son was a divine spirit of the same substance (called subordinationism) or of a similar substance to that of God (called semi-Arianism) to the belief that he was an angel or other lesser spirit creature of a wholly different nature from God. Not all of these views necessarily were held by Arius, the namesake of Arianism. It is still nontrinitarian because, according to it, Jesus was and is a being always been beneath God in divinity, though higher than humans. Arian Christology was not the majority view among Unitarians in Poland, Transylvania, or England. It was only with the advent of American Unitarianism that it gained a foothold in the Unitarian movement.

Among early Christian theologians who believed in a pre-existent Jesus subordinate to God the Father were Lucian of Antioch, Eusebius of Caesarea, Arius, Eusebius of Nicomedia, Asterius the Sophist, Eunomius, and Ulfilas, as well as Felix, Bishop of Urgell. Proponents also associate it (more controversially) with Justin Martyr and Hippolytus of Rome. Antitrinitarian Michael Servetus did not deny the pre-existence of the Christ. In his Treatise Concerning the Divine Trinity, Servetus taught that the Logos was the reflection of Jesus, that said reflection of the Logos was the Word with God "and it was God Himself". He further wrote that "the Word was the very essence of God or the manifestation of God's essence, and there was in God no other substance or hypostasis than His Word, in a bright cloud where God then seemed to subsist. And in that very spot the face and personality of Christ shone bright." Isaac Newton held Arian beliefs as well. Other 19th-century Arian Unitarians included Andrews Norton and William Ellery Channing (in his earlier years).

=== Other beliefs ===
Although there is no specific authority on Unitarian beliefs aside from their inclusion of the rejection of the Trinity, the following beliefs are generally accepted:

- One God and the oneness or unity of God.
- The life and teachings of Jesus constitute the exemplary model for living one's own life.
- Reason, rational thought, science, and philosophy coexist with faith in God.
- Humans have the ability to exercise free will in a responsible, constructive and ethical manner with the assistance of religion.
- Human nature in its present condition is neither inherently corrupt nor depraved (see original sin) but capable of both good and evil, as God intended.
- No religion can claim an absolute monopoly on the Holy Spirit or theological truth.
- Though God inspired the authors of the Christian Bible, they were humans and, therefore, subject to human error.
- The traditional doctrines of predestination, Hell, and the vicarious sacrifice and satisfaction theories of the atonement are invalid because they malign God's character and veil the true nature and mission of Jesus.

In 1938, The Christian Leader attributed "the religion of Jesus, not a religion about Jesus", to Unitarians, though the phrase was used earlier by Congregationalist Rollin Lynde Hartt in 1924.

== Worship ==
Early worship in the Unitarian Christian tradition gave prominence to the preaching of the Bible, exemplified by the promiment pulpits in Unitarian Christian churches. Unitarian Christian churches traditionally contain a wooden communion table for the celebration of the Lord's Supper. The Summa Universae Theologiae Christianae secundum Unitarios maintains a memoralist theology of the Lord's Supper, as does the Racovian Catechism, which states that "this rite is to be observed for the purpose of commemorating or showing forth the kindness manifested by Christ towards us".

In Britain, Unitarian worship varies by congregation, with some congregations including a time for parishioners to publicly share their recent joys or concerns.

== Modern Christian Unitarian organizations ==
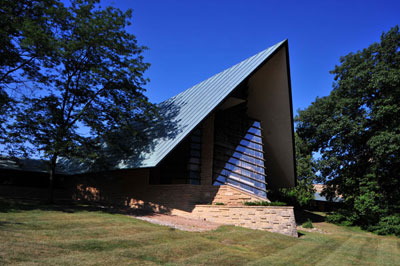
First Unitarian Meeting House in Madison, Wisconsin, designed by Unitarian Frank Lloyd Wright

This section relates to Unitarian churches and organizations today which are still specifically Christian, whether within or outside Unitarian Universalism. Unitarian Universalism, conversely, refers to the embracing of non-Christian religions.

=== International groups ===
The Unitarian Christian Alliance represents various Unitarian Christian denominations and churches. Some Unitarian Christian groups are affiliated with the International Council of Unitarians and Universalists (ICUU), founded in 1995. The ICUU has "full member" groups in Australia, New Zealand, United Kingdom, Canada, Czech Republic, Denmark, EUU, Finland, Germany, Hungary, Indonesia, India, Nigeria, Pakistan, Philippines, Poland, Romania, South Africa, Spain, Sri Lanka and the United States. Brazil is a Provisional Member.

The ICUU includes small "Associate Groups", including Congregazione Italiana Cristiano Unitariana, Turin (founded in 2004) and the Bét Dávid Unitarian Association, Oslo (founded 2005).

=== Transylvania ===
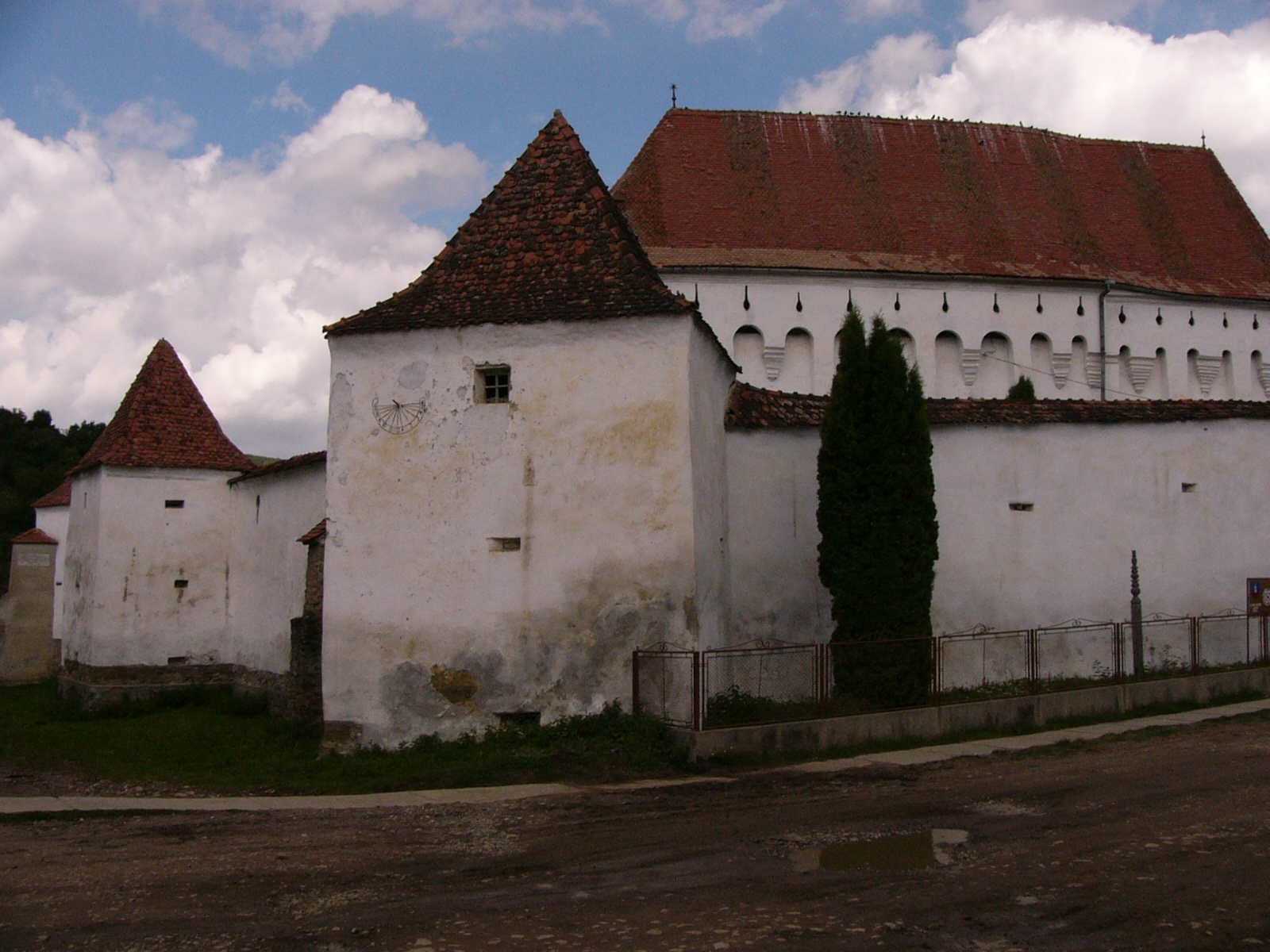
The Dârjiu fortified church, a 13th-century fortified church belonging to the Unitarian Church of Transylvania. This is the only Unitarian fortified church in Transylvania which is on the UNESCO's World Heritage List.

The largest Unitarian denomination worldwide today is also the oldest Unitarian denomination (since 1565, first use of the term "Unitarian" 1600): the Unitarian Church of Transylvania (in Romania, which is in union with the Unitarian Church in Hungary). The church in Transylvania still looks to the statement of faith, the Summa Universae Theologiae Christianae secundum Unitarios (1787), though today assent to this is not required. The modern Unitarian Church in Hungary (25,000 members) and the Transylvanian Unitarian Church (75,000 members) are affiliated with the International Council of Unitarians and Universalists (ICUU) and claim continuity with the historical Unitarian Christian tradition established by Ferenc Dávid in 1565 in Transylvania under John II Sigismund Zápolya. The Unitarian churches in Hungary and Transylvania are structured and organized along a church hierarchy that includes the election by the synod of a national bishop who serves as superintendent of the Church. Many Hungarian Unitarians embrace the principles of rationalist Unitarianism. Unitarian high schools exist only in Transylvania (Romania), including the John Sigismund Unitarian Academy in Cluj-Napoca, the Protestant Theological Institute of Cluj, and the Berde Mózes Unitárius Gimnázium in Cristuru Secuiesc; both teach Rationalist Unitarianism.

=== United Kingdom ===
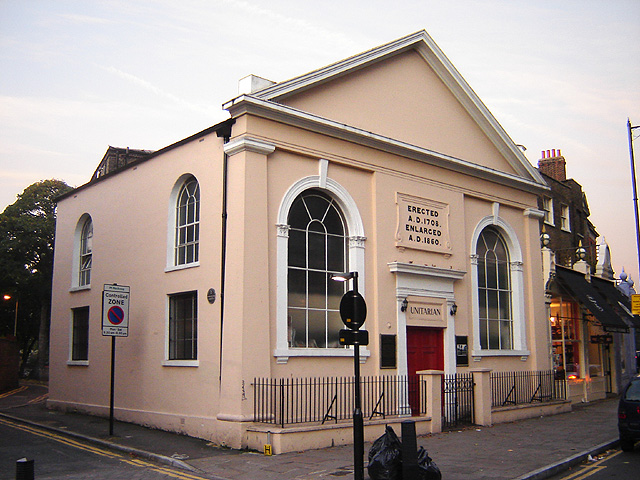
Newington Green Unitarian Church in London, England. Built in 1708, this is the oldest nonconformist church in London still in use.

The Unitarian Christian Association (UCA) was founded in the United Kingdom in 1991 by Rev. Lancelot Garrard (1904–1993) and others to promote specifically Christian ideas within the General Assembly of Unitarian and Free Christian Churches (GAUFCC), the national Unitarian body in the UK. Just as the UUCF and ICUU maintain formal links with the Unitarian Universalist Association in the US, so the UCA is an affiliate body of the GAUFCC in the UK.

The majority of Unitarian Christian publications are sponsored by an organization and published specifically for their membership. Generally, they do not serve as a tool for missionary work or encouraging conversions.

=== India ===
In India, three different schools of Unitarian thought influenced varying movements, including the Brahmo Samaj, the Unitarian Church of the Khasi Hills, and the Unitarian Christian Church of Chennai, in Madras, founded in 1795. As of 2011, "Thirty-five congregations and eight fellowships comprising almost 10,000 Unitarians now form the Unitarian Union of North East India."

=== United States ===
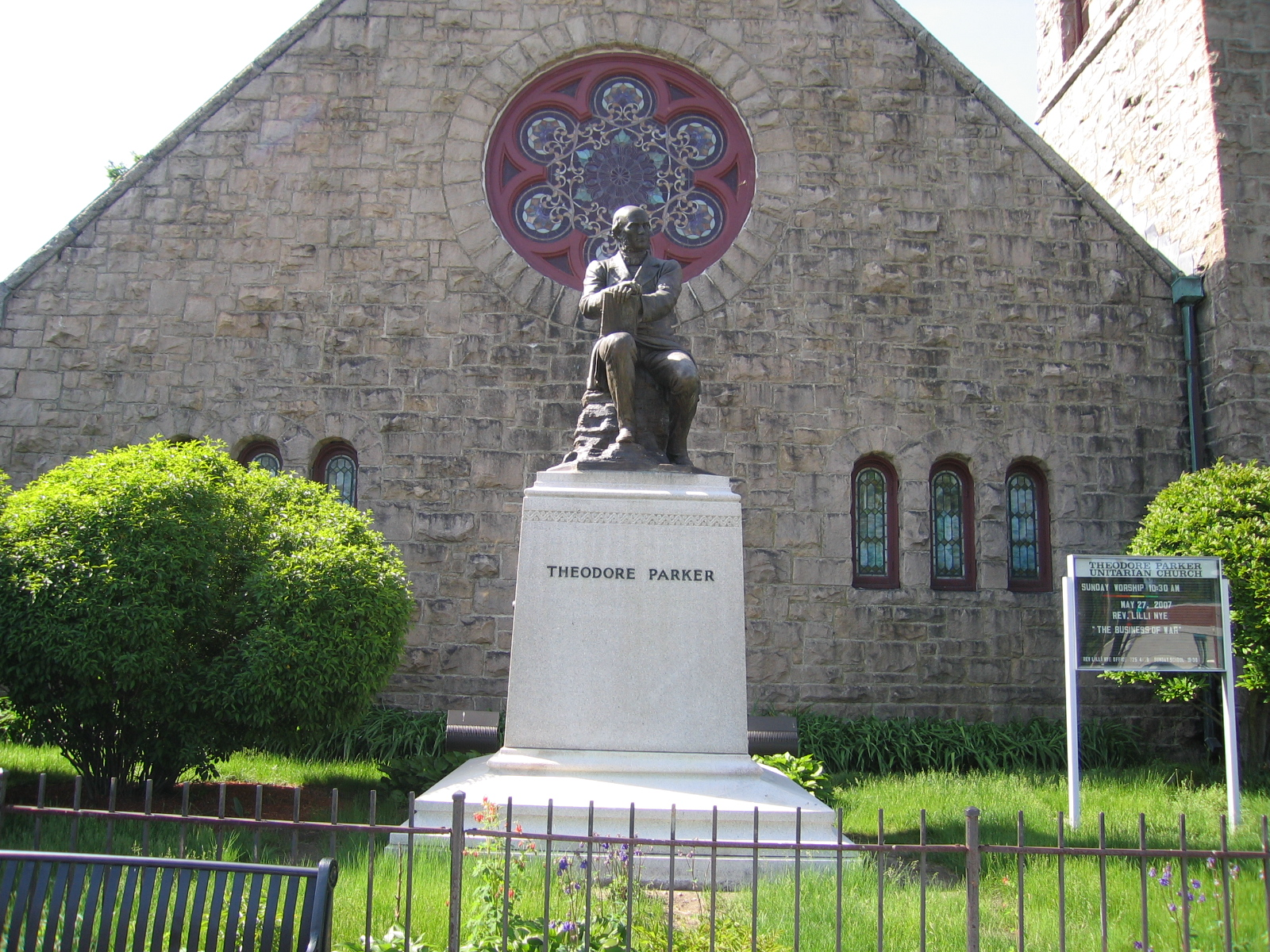
Unitarian minister Theodore Parker (1810–1860) was a prominent reformer and abolitionist. His statue is in front of the Theodore Parker Unitarian Universalist Church in West Roxbury, Massachusetts.

The American Unitarian Conference (AUC) was formed in 2000 and stands between UUA and ICUU in attachment to the Christian element of modern Unitarianism. The American Unitarian Conference is open to non-Christian Unitarians, being particularly popular with non-Christian theists and deists. As of 2009, the AUC has three congregations in the United States.

Unitarian Christian Ministries International was a Unitarian ministry incorporated in South Carolina until its dissolution in 2013 when it merged with the Unitarian Christian Emerging Church. The Unitarian Christian Emerging Church has recently undergone reorganization and today is known as the Unitarian Christian Church of America. In addition, the Unitarian Universalist Faith Alliance and Ministries follow a Progressive Christian format honoring Sacred Space and Creation Spirituality.

The Unitarian Christian Church of America (UCCA) was formed on 1 October 2016 through the merging of the Unitarian Christian Emerging Church and the Unitarian Christian Conference. The church's current ministry in on-line and through local fellowship gatherings. The current senior pastor and current president of the UCCA is the Reverend Dr. Shannon Rogers. The UCCA has both ordained and lay members.

=== Australia and New Zealand ===
The first Unitarian Church in Australia was built in 1854 in Melbourne and was followed soon afterwards by chapels in Sydney and Adelaide, and later regional centres including Ballarat. The modern church, no longer unitarian Christian, retains properties in Adelaide, Sydney and Melbourne, and smaller congregations elsewhere in Australia and New Zealand.

=== South Africa ===
The Unitarian movement in South Africa was founded in 1867 by David Faure, member of a well-known Cape family. He encountered advanced liberal religious thought while completing his studies at the University of Leiden in the Netherlands for the ministry of the Dutch Reformed Church in Cape Town.

=== Ireland ===
There are two active Unitarian churches in Ireland, one in Dublin and the other in Cork. Both are member churches of the Non-subscribing Presbyterian Church of Ireland.

=== Denmark ===
Unitarianism was a latecomer to Denmark. Some of the inspiration came from Norway and England – family members of the founders, and the wife of Edward Grieg. 1900–1918 the society priest was Uffe Birkedal, who had previously been a Lutheran priest. He held the first worship 18 February 1900. A founding general assembly 18 May 1900 elected Mary Bess Westenholz as the first chairman of the Society. The Society newsletter was named Protestantisk Tidende 1904–1993, and then renamed Unitaren, reflecting a gradually changing perception of being part of the Danish Lutheran Church, to one where this was no longer assumed.

=== Germany ===
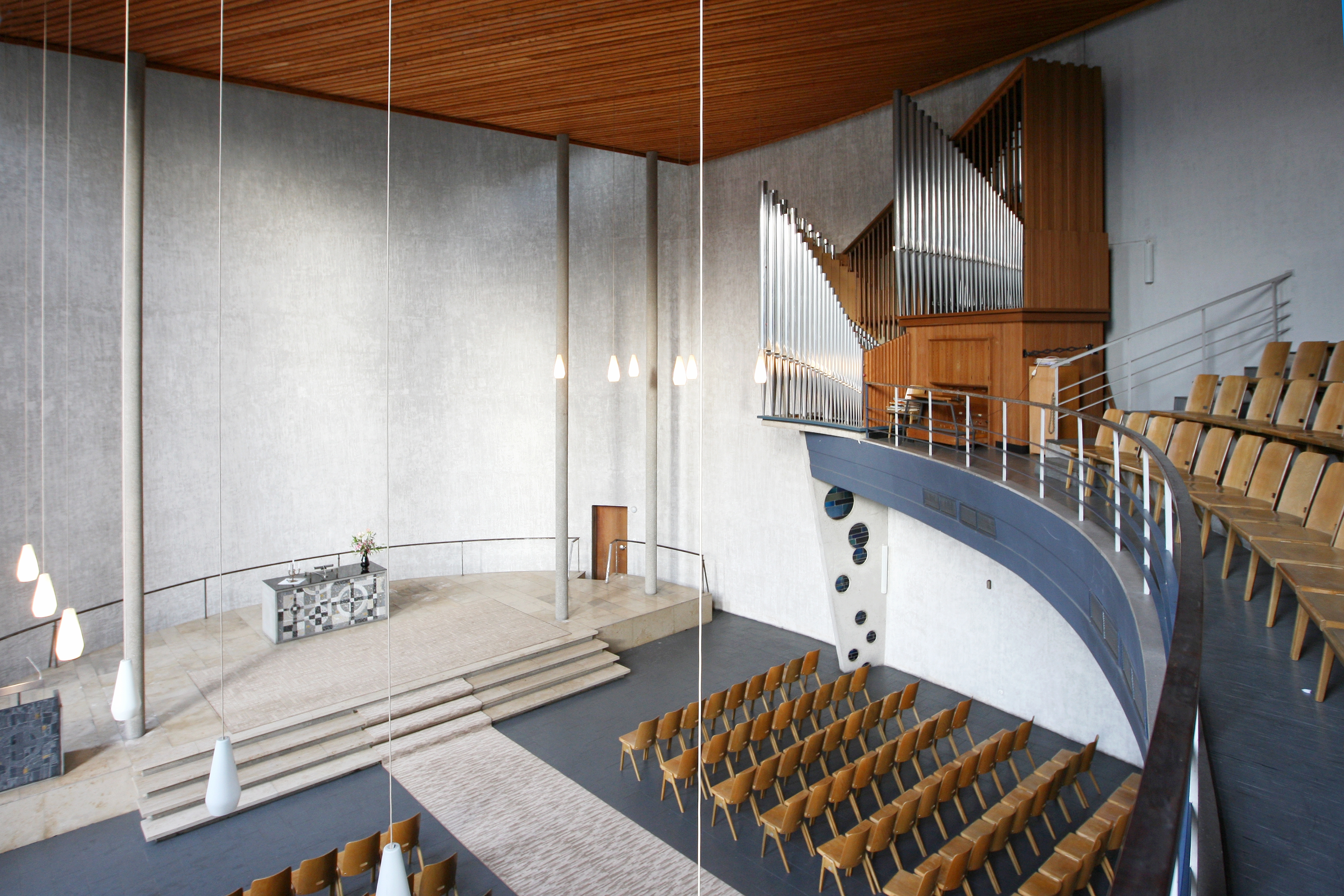
Interior view of the Unitarian consecration hall in Frankfurt – view from the gallery

Many of the Unitarian communities present in Germany today represent a non-Christian, humanistic Unitarianism that is not historically connected to the Christian, anti-Trinitarian Unitarianism of the Reformation era. Alongside these, there are also groups that adhere to the Christian orientation. In Germany, there are, among others, the Unitarians – Religious Community of Free Faith, the Unitarian Free Religious Community in Frankfurt am Main, the Unitarian Church in Berlin, the Christian Unitarians, and regional groups of the European Unitarian Universalists (including in Frankfurt am Main and Kaiserslautern).

=== Biblical Unitarians ===
Biblical Unitarianism identifies the Christian belief that the Bible teaches that God the Father is one singular being, and that Jesus Christ is a distinct being, the exalted Son of God. A few denominations use this term to describe themselves, clarifying the distinction between them and those churches which, from the late 19th century, evolved into modern British Unitarianism and, primarily in the United States, Unitarian Universalism. In 16th-century Italy, Biblical Unitarianism was powered by the ideas of the Non-trinitarian theologians Lelio and Fausto Sozzini, founders of Socinianism; their doctrine was embraced and further developed by the Unitarian Church of Transylvania during the 16th and 17th centuries. Unitarian Christian doctrine from the Socinian perspective, is codified in the Racovian Catechism. Today, it's represented by the churches associated with the Christian Church in Italy.

== Notable Unitarians ==
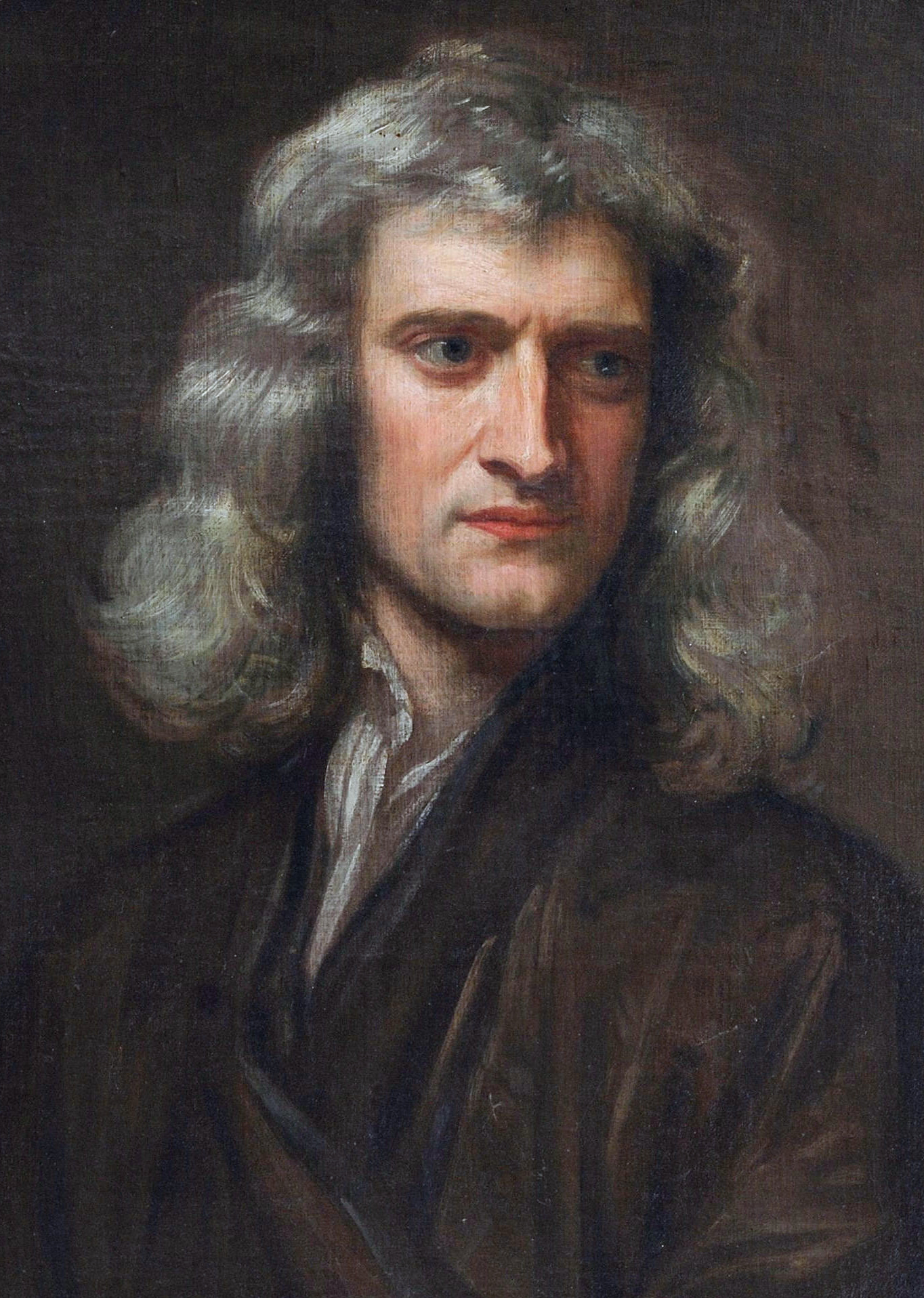
Isaac Newton held Arian views.

Notable Unitarians include classical composers Edvard Grieg and Béla Bartók; Ralph Waldo Emerson, Theodore Parker, Yveon Seon and Thomas Lamb Eliot in theology and ministry; Oliver Heaviside, Erasmus Darwin, Joseph Priestley, John Archibald Wheeler, Linus Pauling, Sir Isaac Newton and inventor Sir Francis Ronalds in science; George Boole in mathematics; Susan B. Anthony in civil government; Frances Ellen Watkins Harper, Whitney Young of the National Urban League, and Florence Nightingale in humanitarianism and social justice; John Bowring, Samuel Taylor Coleridge and Elizabeth Gaskell in literature; Frank Lloyd Wright in the arts; Josiah Wedgwood, Richard Peacock and Samuel Carter MP in industry; Thomas Starr King in ministry and politics; and Charles William Eliot in education. Julia Ward Howe was a leader in the woman suffrage movement, the first ever woman to be elected to the Academy of Arts and Letters, and author of the "Battle Hymn of the Republic", volumes of poetry, and other writing. Although raised a Quaker, Ezra Cornell, founder of Cornell University in Ithaca, New York, attended the Unitarian church and was one of the founders of Ithaca's First Unitarian Church. Eramus Darwin Shattuck, a signatory to the Oregon State Constitution, founded the first Unitarian church in Oregon in 1865.

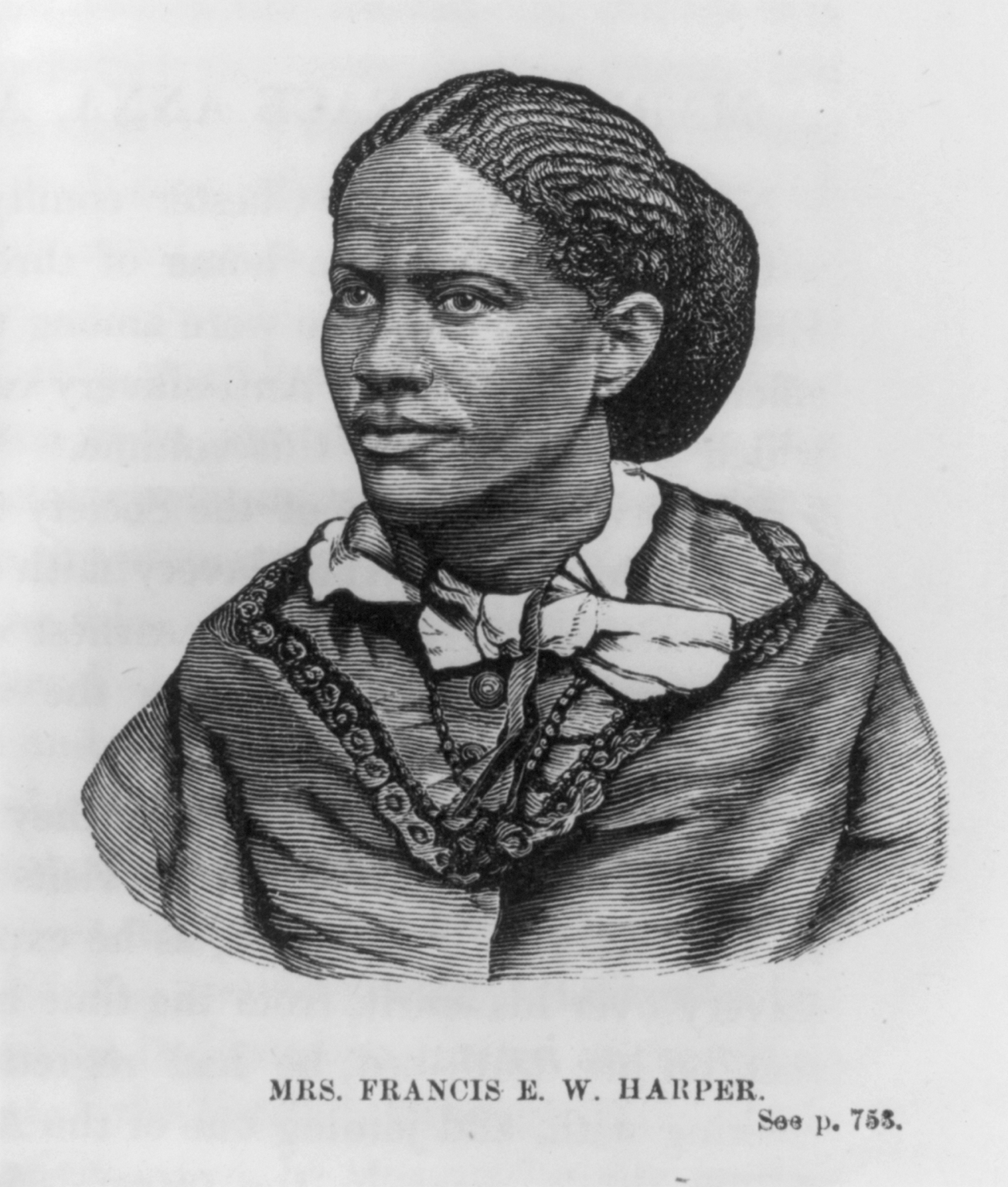
Frances Ellen Watkins Harper was an abolitionist, journalist, and suffragist associated with both American Unitarianism and the African Methodist Episcopal Church.

Eleven Nobel Prizes have been awarded to Unitarians: Robert Millikan and John Bardeen (twice) in physics; Emily Green Balch, Albert Schweitzer and Linus Pauling for peace; George Wald and David H. Hubel in medicine; Linus Pauling in chemistry; and Herbert A. Simon in economics.

Four presidents of the United States were Unitarians: John Adams, John Quincy Adams, Millard Fillmore, and William Howard Taft. Adlai Stevenson II, the Democratic presidential nominee in 1952 and 1956, was a Unitarian; he was the last Unitarian to be nominated by a major party for president as of 2024. Although a self-styled materialist, Thomas Jefferson was pro-Unitarian to the extent of suggesting that it would become the predominant religion in the United States. John Adams is widely considered the first Unitarian president, while some describe him as Christian Deist. In a 1813 letter to Jefferson, Adams asserted that the Christian Trinity was a "fabrication" derived from Pythagorean and Platonic philosophies rather than divine revelation, and expressed surprise that theologian Joseph Priestley had overlooked these connections.

In the United Kingdom, although Unitarianism was the religion of only a small minority of the population, its practitioners had an enormous impact on Victorian politics, not only in the larger cities – Birmingham, Leeds, Manchester and Liverpool – but in smaller communities such as Leicester, where there were so many Unitarian mayors that the Unitarian Chapel was known as the "Mayors' Nest". Numerous Unitarian families were highly significant in the social and political life of Britain from Victorian times to the middle of the 20th century. They included the Nettlefolds, Martineaus, Luptons, Kitsons, Chamberlains and Kenricks. In Birmingham, England, a Unitarian church – the Church of the Messiah – was opened in 1862. It became a cultural and intellectual centre of a whole society, a place where ideas about society were openly and critically discussed. (Note: Henry W. Crosskey's congregation included Joseph Chamberlain, father of British prime minister Neville Chamberlain and Arthur, his younger brother, who was married to Louisa Kenrick; William Kenrick, his brother-in-law, who was married to Mary Chamberlain; and Sir Thomas Martineau, who was the nephew of Harriet Martineau, another outspoken public figure and author. Sir Thomas Martineau (died 1893) was related to the Chamberlain family by marriage; Sir Thomas had married Emily Kenrick, the sister of Florence Chamberlain, née Kenrick. In Lambeth, South London, another two members of the Martineau family, Caroline and Constance, worked at Morley College, the former acting as (unpaid) principal for over 11 years. Several other prominent Unitarians were involved in the development of this liberal arts college, which was founded by actors at the Old Vic theatre.)

== See also ==
- Anomoeanism – radical Arians of the 4th century.
- Binitarianism
- Christadelphians
- Divine simplicity
- Jesus in Islam
- Jehovah's Witnesses
- Messianic Judaism
- Monarchianism
- The New Church
- New Thought
- Nondualism
- Non-Trinitarian churches
- Sabellianism
- Tawhid
- Unitarian (disambiguation)
  - Unitarian church (disambiguation)
