= First Unitarian Church =

First Unitarian Church may refer to:

- First Unitarian Church (Berkeley, California), listed on the National Register of Historic Places (NRHP)
- First Unitarian Church of Los Angeles, Los Angeles, California
- First Unitarian Church of Oakland, Oakland, California, NRHP-listed
- First Unitarian Church of San Jose, San Jose, California, NRHP-listed
- First Unitarian Church of Honolulu, Honolulu, Hawaii
- First Unitarian Church of Chicago, Chicago, Illinois
- First Unitarian Church of Hobart, Hobart, Indiana, NRHP-listed
- First Unitarian Church (Des Moines, Iowa), one of the notable Unitarian churches
- First Unitarian Church (Iowa City, Iowa), NRHP-listed
- First Unitarian Church (Baltimore, Maryland), NRHP-listed
- First Unitarian Church (Peabody, Massachusetts), NRHP-listed
- First Unitarian Church (Somerville, Massachusetts), NRHP-listed
- First Unitarian Church (Stoneham, Massachusetts), NRHP-listed
- First Unitarian Church of Detroit, Detroit, Michigan, NRHP-listed
- First Unitarian Church of Omaha, Omaha, Nebraska, NRHP-listed
- First Unitarian Church of Philadelphia, Philadelphia, Pennsylvania, NRHP-listed
- First Unitarian Church of Providence, Rhode Island
- First Unitarian Church of Rochester, Rochester, New York
- First Unitarian Church (Cincinnati, Ohio), NRHP-listed
- First Unitarian Church of Marietta, Marietta, Ohio, NRHP-listed
- First Unitarian Church of Portland, Portland, Oregon, NRHP-listed
- First Unitarian Church (Milwaukee, Wisconsin), NRHP-listed

== See also ==
- First Unitarian Society (disambiguation)
- List of Unitarian churches
