= First Unitarian Society =

First Unitarian Society usually designates a humanist Unitarian/Unitarian Universalist congregation, and may refer to:

- First Unitarian Society, Minneapolis, established 1881, birthplace of religious humanism
- First Unitarian Society in Newton, Massachusetts (1906)
- First Unitarian Society Meetinghouse, Shorewood Hills, Madison, Wisconsin (1951), a National Historic Landmark and NRHP-listed

== See also ==
- Unitarian Society (disambiguation)
- First Unitarian Church (disambiguation)
- List of Unitarian churches
