= Unitarism =

Unitarism may refer to:

- Political unitarism, political doctrine advocating for creation of a unitary state
- Ethnic unitarism, a form of ethnic homogenization
- Cultural unitarism, a form of cultural homogenization
- Unitarism (management), a term in human resource management

== See also ==
- Unionism (disambiguation)
- Unitarianism (disambiguation)
