= Unitarian church =

A Unitarian church is a religious group which follows Unitarianism, Unitarian Universalism, Free Christianity, or another movement with "Unitarian" in its name.

Unitarian church may refer specifically to:

== National churches ==
- General Assembly of Unitarian and Free Christian Churches, the main body in the United Kingdom
- Unitarian Universalist Association, in the U.S.
- Canadian Unitarian Council
- Unitarian Church of Transylvania, 1565–present, in what is now Romania and Hungary
- Non-subscribing Presbyterian Church of Ireland
- American Unitarian Association, 1825–1961

== Local churches ==
=== United Kingdom ===
- Billingshurst Unitarian Chapel, 1754, West Sussex
- Brighton Unitarian Church, 1820, built by Amon Henry Wilds
- Newington Green Unitarian Church, North London
- Rivington Unitarian Chapel, in Lancashire
- Rosslyn Hill Unitarian Chapel, Hampstead, North London; one of the biggest congregations nationally
- Todmorden Unitarian Church, in West Yorkshire
- Toxteth Unitarian Chapel, in Liverpool
- Unitarian Chapel, Liverpool
- Unitarian Meeting House, Ipswich
- York Unitarian Chapel, a building on St. Saviourgate, York, England

=== United States ===
- Unitarian Church (Hampton Falls, New Hampshire), NRHP-listed
- Unitarian Church in Summit, in Summit, New Jersey
- Unitarian Church of All Souls, New York City
- Unitarian Church in Charleston, South Carolina
- All Souls Unitarian Church (Tulsa, Oklahoma)
- All Souls Church, Unitarian (Washington, D.C.), founded as the First Unitarian Church of Washington
- Unitarian Church (Burlington, Vermont)
- Unitarian Memorial Church, in Fairhaven, Massachusetts
- Mount Vernon Unitarian Church

== See also ==
- List of Unitarian, Universalist, and Unitarian Universalist churches
- First Unitarian Church (disambiguation)
- United and uniting churches, formed through the merger between two or more Protestant denominations
