= Beryllus of Bostra =

3rd century bishop of Bostra, Nabatea

Beryllus of Bostra (fl. c. 222–235) was a bishop of Bostra whose writings are lost but is mainly remembered for denying the pre-existence of Christ, and also for dynamic Monarchianism, the denial of Christ's independent divinity. According to Eusebius he was among the "learned churchmen" (Hist. eccl. VI, 20) of the period. His writings and letters were held in the library established by Alexander of Jerusalem, but have not been preserved. Origen disputed with Beryllus at the Councils of Arabia regarding Monarchianism between 238 and 244 and appears to have persuaded him, though he may have retained his view on pre-existence. Beryllos offers an early example of the heretical beliefs Hellenic Christians imputed to the Arabs as a race.

== See also ==
- Artemon
- Theodotus of Byzantium
- Paul of Samosata
- Photinus
- Natalius
