= Photinus =

Bishop

Photinus (Greek: Φωτεινός; died 376) was a Christian bishop of Sirmium in Pannonia Secunda (today the town Sremska Mitrovica in Serbia), best known for denying the incarnation of Christ, thus being considered a heresiarch by Catholic, Orthodox, and many Protestant Churches. His name became synonymous in later literature for someone asserting that Christ was not God. His teachings are mentioned by various ancient authors, like Ambrosiaster (Pseudo-Ambrose), Hilary of Poitiers, Socrates Scholasticus, Sozomen, Ambrose of Milan, Augustine of Hippo, John Cassian, Sulpicius Severus, Jerome, Vigilius of Thapsus and many others.

None of his writings are extant; his views must be reconstructed through his critics.

== Life ==
Photinus grew up in Ancyra in Galatia, where he was a student and later a deacon of bishop Marcellus. Marcellus, in later life a staunch opponent of Arianism, was excommunicated and deposed in 336 but rehabilitated by the Synod of Serdica in 343, which also made Photinus bishop of Sirmium. In 344, the Synod of Antioch deposed Marcellus and drew up the Macrostich, a creed which listed their beliefs and objections to Marcellus's doctrines (among others). R. P. C. Hanson (1973) described Photinus' Christology as consistent with the early teachings of Marcellus between 340 and 350.

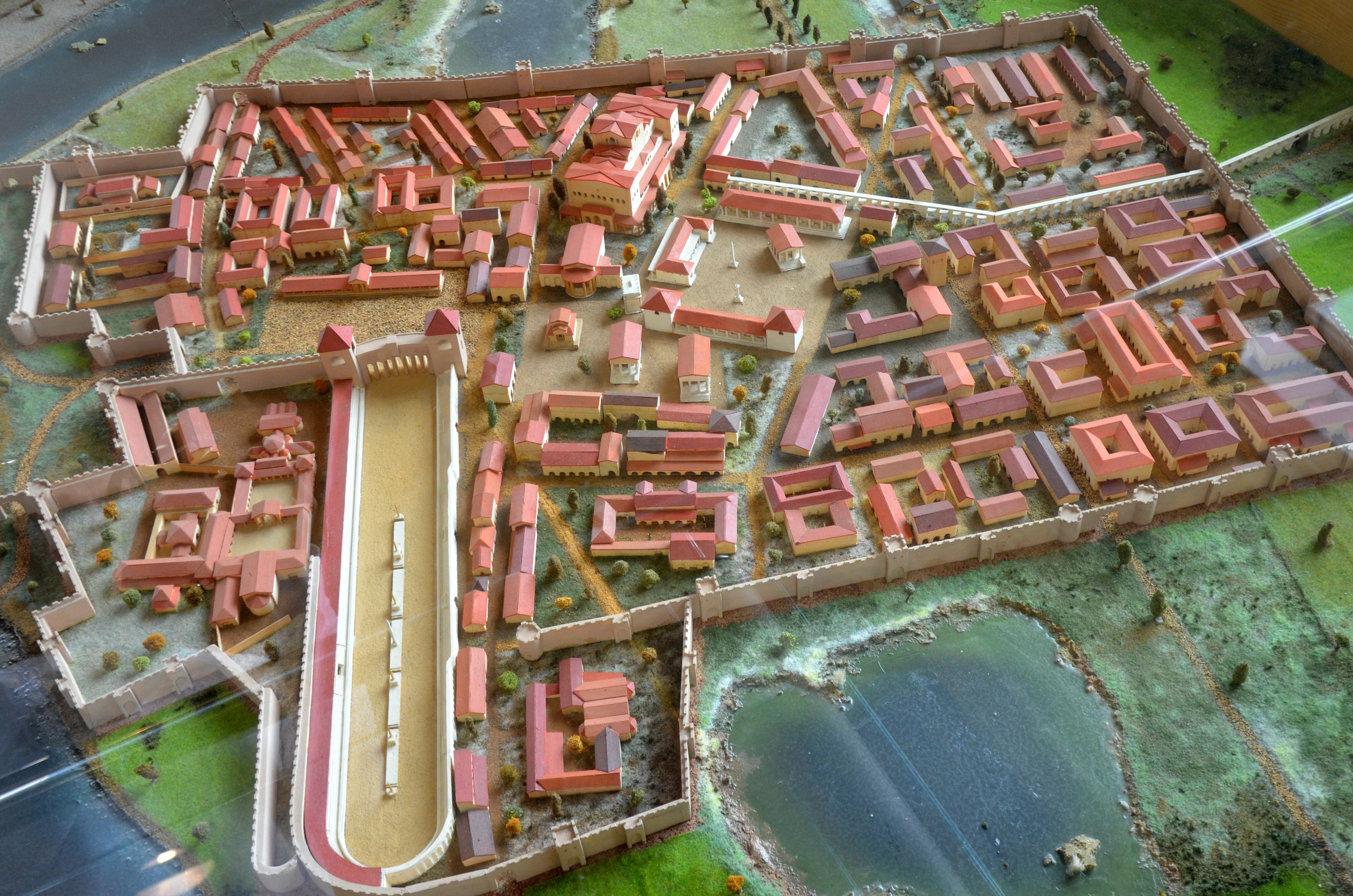
A scale model of Sirmium in Sremska Mitrovica, Serbia

At the time Photinus voiced his own theological system, according to which Jesus was not divine and the Logos did not exist before the conception of Jesus. For Photinus the Logos was simply a mode of manifestation of the Father, hence he denied the pre-existence of Christ and saw theophanies in the Old Testament as of the father, and the image of the "Son of God" (actually, Son of man) in front of (and distinct from) the Ancient of Days as prediction only. Photinus's apprehension of God as Father, and his teachings about the nature of Jesus Christ are maybe more complex than has been thought.

The church historian Socrates Scholasticus identifies Photinus' beliefs with those of Sabellius, Paul of Samosata and Marcellus. This also was presumably misapprehension of Photinus' doctrine about Jesus. Ambrose, among the many accusing Photinus of reducing Christ to a man adopted by God, notes that his favourite verses were 1 Timothy 2:5 and John 8:40. In the controversies against Polish Socinian influence in the 18th century, Photinus was repeatedly cast as a heretical predecessor of early Unitarians for his denial of the pre-existence of Christ.

Synods held in 345 and 347 excommunicated Photinus, but Photinus remained in office due to his popular support. A synod at Sirmium was held and Hilarius of Poitiers quotes some of its Arian propositions.

Photinus appealed to emperor Constantius II. At another synod in Sirmium in 351, Photinus argued with the semi-Arian Basil of Ancyra and Photinus was deposed on charges of Sabellianism and Adoptionism. He was anathematised and sent into exile, where he wrote several theological works.

He returned to his see during the reign of Emperor Julian the Apostate, who wrote him an approving letter in AD 362, which attacked Diodore of Tarsus, who was then engaged in combatting Julian's attempts to de-Christianize the empire, and began:

O Photinus, you at any rate seem to maintain what is probably true, and come nearest to being saved, and do well to believe that he whom one holds to be a god can by no means be brought into the womb. But Diodorus, a charlatan priest of the Nazarene, when he tries to give point to that nonsensical theory about the womb by artifices and juggler's tricks, is clearly a sharp-witted sophist of that creed of the country-folk.

Ambrosiaster, in the next generation, probably referred to this letter when he commented that Photinus 'because he did not regard Christ as God on the grounds that he was born, he appears wise to the worldly.'

According to Jerome, Emperor Valentinian I (364–375) exiled Photinus again. In about 365, a letter from Liberius, bishop of Rome, to several Macedonian bishops mentions a bishop called Photinus among the latter. It is unlikely that this refers to Photinus, bishop of Sirmium, whose see was located in Pannonia) and not Macedonia.

After being exiled by Valentinian, Photinus settled in his native Galatia and his doctrines, Photinianism, died in the West. By the time of Augustine, a "Photinian" was anyone who believed Christ was merely a man.

== See also ==
- Artemon
- Beryllus of Bostra
- Natalius
- Paul of Samosata
- Theodotus of Byzantium
