= Demetrius of Antioch =

3rd-century Patriarch of Antioch

- Patriarch of Antioch
- Church: Church of Antioch
- Installed: c. 253–256 or c. 260–261
- Predecessor: Fabius of Antioch
- Successor: Paul of Samosata

Demetrius of Antioch was patriarch of Antioch in the 3rd century AD. In 253 he was taken to Persia as a captive by Shapur I, where he became the first bishop of Gundeshapur. Despite being far from his original see, Demetrius was not replaced as patriarch of Antioch until Paul of Samosata became Patriarch in 260.

== Bibliography ==
- Baum, Wilhelm; Winkler, Dietmar W. (2003). The Church of the East - A Concise History. London-New York: Routledge-Curzon. ISBN 978-1-134-43019-2.

Titles of the Great Christian Church
Preceded by Fabius	Patriarch of Antioch c. 253–256 or c. 260–261	Succeeded by Paul
