= Paul of Samosata =

Patriarch of Antioch from 260 to 268

- Patriarch of Antioch
- Portrait by Romeyn de Hooghe, 1688
- Church: Church of Antioch
- Installed: 260–268
- Predecessor: Demetrius of Antioch
- Successor: Domnus I of Antioch

Personal details
- Born: 200 Samosata
- Died: 275

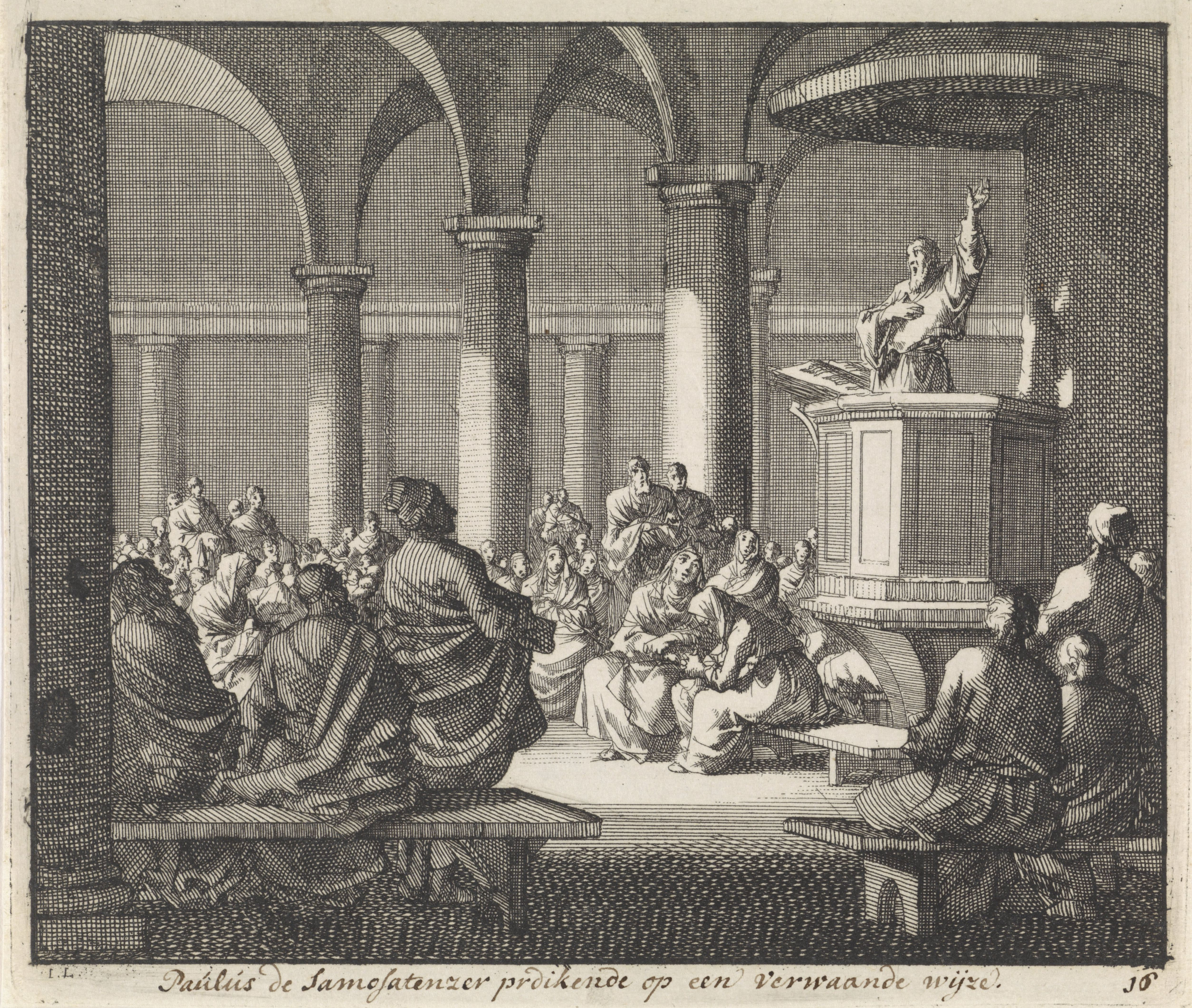
Paul of Samosata preaches from the pulpit.

Paul of Samosata (Ancient Greek: Παῦλος ὁ Σαμοσατεύς, lived from 200 to 275) was patriarch of Antioch from 260 to 268 and the originator of the Paulianist heresy named after him. He was a believer in monarchianism, a nontrinitarian doctrine; his teachings also reflect adoptionism.

== Life ==
Paul was born at Samosata into a family of humble origin. He was elected patriarch of Antioch in 260. He held the civil office of Procurator ducenarius.

His Monarchianist teachings aroused strong opposition in the church. He was also accused of corruption on a grand scale. Edward Gibbon describes him as follows:

The wealth of that prelate was a sufficient evidence of his guilt since it was neither derived from the inheritance of his fathers nor acquired by the arts of honest industry. But Paul considered the service of the church as a very lucrative profession. His ecclesiastical jurisdiction was venal and rapacious; he extorted frequent contributions from the most opulent of the faithful and converted to his own use a considerable part of the public revenue. By his pride and luxury the Christian religion was rendered odious in the eyes of the Gentiles. His council chamber and his throne, the splendour with which he appeared in public, the suppliant crowd who solicited his attention, the multitude of letters and petitions to which he dictated his answers, and the perpetual hurry of business in which he was involved, were circumstances much better suited to the state of a civil magistrate than to the humility of a primitive bishop. When he harangued his people from the pulpit, Paul affected the figurative style and the theatrical gestures of an Asiatic sophist, while the cathedral resounded with the loudest and most extravagant acclamations in the praise of his divine eloquence. Against those who resisted his power, or refused to flatter his vanity, the prelate of Antioch was arrogant, rigid, and inexorable; but he relaxed the discipline, and lavished the treasures of the church on his dependent clergy, who were permitted to imitate their master in the gratification of every sensual appetite. For Paul indulged himself very freely in the pleasures of the table, and he had received into the episcopal palace two young and beautiful women, as the constant companions of his leisure moments.

In 269, seventy bishops, priests and deacons assembled at Antioch as a Pre-Ecumenical synod or council called the Synods of Antioch:

From Egypt to the Euxine Sea, the bishops were in arms and in motion. Several councils were held, confutations were published, ex-communications were pronounced, ambiguous explanations were by turns accepted and refused, treaties were concluded and violated.

The synod deposed Paul as bishop and elected Domnus I as his successor. They also wrote an encyclical letter to Pope Dionysius and Pope Maximus of Alexandria, bishops of Rome and Alexandria respectively. This letter is the only indisputably contemporary document concerning him and was preserved in Eusebius of Caesarea's Ecclesiastical History.

However, because the synod had acted without consulting the clergy or the people, its authority was in question, enabling Paul to claim continued possession of his bishopric. Since he had friendly relations with Zenobia, the separatist queen of Palmyra ruling in Syria, he maintained his occupancy of the bishop's house in Antioch for another four years. Late in 272, however, when the emperor Aurelian defeated Zenobia, Paul lost her protection. Aurelian allowed the two parties, for and against Paul, to present their cases before his own tribunal. Aurelian was not a Christian and had no interest in the doctrinal issues of the Church. Wishing only to restore order, he relied on the judgment of the bishops of Italy and Rome. The unanimous verdict was for Paul to relinquish his position as bishop.

The ruling of Aurelian occurred during the "Little Peace of the Church", a roughly 40-year period when Christianity flourished without official sanctions from the central government. It was the first time the Church had sought the emperor's intervention in an internal dispute.

== Teachings ==
Paul's teaching is a form of Monarchianism, which emphasised the oneness of God. Paul taught that Jesus was born a mere man, but that he was infused with the divine Logos or word of God. Hence, Jesus was seen not as God-become-man but as man-become-God. In his Discourses to Sabinus of Spoleto, of which only fragments are preserved in a book against heresies ascribed to Anastasius, Paul writes:

- "Having been anointed by the Holy Spirit he received the title of the anointed (i.e. Christos), suffering in accordance with his nature, working wonders in accordance with grace. For in fixity and resoluteness of character he likened himself to God, and having kept himself free from sin was united with God, and was empowered to grasp as it were the power and authority of wonders. By these he was shown to possess over and above the will, one and the same activity (with God), and won the title of Redeemer and Saviour of our race";
- "The Saviour became holy and just; and by struggle and hard work overcame the sins of our forefather. By these means he succeeded in perfecting himself, and was through his moral excellence united with God; having attained to unity and sameness of will and energy (i.e. activity) with Him through his advances in the path of good deeds. This will be preserved inseparable (from the Divine), and so inherited the name which is above all names, the prize of love and affection vouchsafed in grace to him";
- "We do not award praise to beings which submit merely in virtue of their nature, but we do award high praise to beings which submit because their attitude is one of love; and so submitting because their inspiring motive is one and the same, they are confirmed and strengthened by one and the same indwelling power, of which the force ever grows, so that it never ceases to stir. It was in virtue of this love that the Saviour coalesced with God, so as to admit of no divorce from Him, but for all ages to retain one and the same will and activity with Him, an activity perpetually at work in the manifestation of good";
- "Wonder not that the Saviour had one will with God. For as nature manifests the substance of the many to subsist as one and the same, so the attitude of love produces in the many a unity and a sameness of will which is manifested by unity and sameness of approval and well-pleasingness".

Paul was an early forerunner of Adoptionism. It was suggested that the Paulicians of Armenia adhered to his teachings, and received their name from him. However, historical records show that the Paulicians were bitterly persecuted more for their gnostic and iconoclastic views than for their adherence to Adoptionism.

Paul's pupil Lucian of Antioch is considered to have had a major influence on Arius the founder of Arianism.

=== Eusebius' account ===
Another major source of information we have of Paul of Samosata comes from Eusebius of Caesarea, who described some of the doctrines and practices Paul displayed openly, which included:

- Receiving money for his religious services, as well as paying others to preach his doctrines;
- Preferring to be called an imperial procurator of queen Zenobia, rather than bishop;
- Stopping the production of psalms to Christ, and training women to sing psalms to himself as an angel come down from heaven.

Likewise, Eusebius hints to the fact that Paul was "too familiar" with his women followers, whom he called "subintroductae".

== Aftermath ==
Canon 19 of the First Council of Nicaea dealt with the Paulianists:

Concerning the Paulianists who have flown for refuge to the Catholic Church, it has been decreed that they must by all means be rebaptised; and if any of them who in past time have been numbered among their clergy should be found blameless and without reproach, let them be rebaptised and ordained by the Bishop of the Catholic Church; but if the examination should discover them to be unfit, they ought to be deposed. Likewise in the case of their deaconesses, and generally in the case of those who have been enrolled among their clergy, let the same form be observed. And we mean by deaconesses such as have assumed the habit, but who, since they have no imposition of hands, are to be numbered only among the laity.

Athanasius of Alexandria explained that despite the fact that the followers of Paul of Samosata baptised in the name of the Trinity, they did not make it in the orthodox sense, making their baptism invalid. The Paulianists seemed to have disappeared soon after the council, although the Paulicianists, a 7th-century dualistic sect, were often misidentified as being one and the same.

== See also ==
- Artemon
- Beryllus of Bostra
- Photinus
- Natalius
- Theodotus of Byzantium

== Bibliography ==
- Clifton, Chas S. (1992): Encyclopedia of Heresies and Heretics, ABC-CLIO Books.

Titles of the Great Christian Church
Preceded by Demetrius	Patriarch of Antioch; 260 – 268	Succeeded by Domnus I
