= Demeter Hunyadi =

Hungarian Unitarian

Demeter Hunyadi (1579–1592) was a Hungarian Unitarian. In 1579 he became the second superintendent of the Antitrinitarian Church. The early Unitarian Christian leader Demeter Hunyadi led the effort to catechize the faithful. The first Unitarian Christian confession of faith was the Consensus Ministrorum, which holds to a Unitarian view of God and teaches that Jesus Christ should be adored; the confession of faith titled the Complanatio (1638) established the divinity of Christ (though subordinate to God), as well as the necessity of the sacraments of infant baptism and reception of the eucharist.
