= Artemon =

Teacher

Artemon (Ancient Greek: Ἀρτέμων) (fl. c. 230 AD), a prominent Christian teacher in Rome, who held Adoptionist, or Nontrinitarian views. Little is known about his life.

He is mentioned as the leader of a nontrinitarian sect at Rome in the third century. He is spoken of by Eusebius of Caesarea as the forerunner of Paul of Samosata, an opinion confirmed by the acts of a Council of Antioch in 264, which connect the two names as united in mutual communion and support. Eusebius and Theodoret describe his teaching as a denial of Christ's divinity and an assertion that he was a mere man, the falsification of Scripture, and an appeal to tradition in support of his errors. Both authors mention refutations: Eusebius an untitled work, Theodoret one known as The Little Labyrinth, which has been attributed to a Roman priest named Caius, and more recently to Hippolytus of Rome, the supposed author of the Philosophoumena.

== Eusebius' Account ==
Eusebius' main account of Artemon is found in Ecclesiastical History Book V, Chapter XXVIII, and speaks as follows:

For they say that all the early teachers and the apostles received and taught what they now declare, and that the truth of the Gospel was preserved until the times of Victor, who was the thirteenth bishop of Rome from Peter, but that from his successor, Zephyrinus, the truth had been corrupted. And what they say might be plausible, if first of all the Divine Scriptures did not contradict them. And there are writings of certain brethren older than the times of Victor, which they wrote in behalf of the truth against the heathen, and against the heresies which existed in their day. I refer to Justin and Miltiades and Tatian and Clement and many others, in all of whose works Christ is spoken of as God. For who does not know the works of Irenaeus and of Melito and of others which teach that Christ is God and man? And how many psalms and hymns, written by the faithful brethren from the beginning, celebrate Christ the Word of God, speaking of Him as Divine. How then since the opinion held by the Church has been preached for so many years, can its preaching have deen delayed as they affirm, until the times of Victor?

=== Syllogisms and Geometry ===
Eusebius states that:

They do not endeavor to learn what the Divine Scriptures declare, but strive laboriously after any form of syllogism which may be devised to sustain their impiety. And if any one brings before them a passage of Divine Scripture, they see whether a conjective or disjunctive form of syllogism can be made from it. And as being of the earth and speaking of the earth, and as ignorant of him who cometh from above, they forsake the holy writings of God to devote themselves to geometry. Euclid is laboriously measured by some of them; and Aristotle and Theophrastus are admired; and Galen, perhaps, by some is even worshiped.

== See also ==
- Beryllus of Bostra
- Theodotus of Byzantium
- Paul of Samosata
- Photinus
- Natalius
