= Unitarian Society =

The Unitarian Society or Unitarian Society may refer to:

- Unitarian Society (Fall River), an historic church building in Fall River, Massachusetts
- First Unitarian Society (disambiguation)
- First Unitarian Society of Madison, a Unitarian Universalist congregation in Shorewood Hills, Madison, Wisconsin
- First Unitarian Society in Newton, West Newton, Newton, Massachusetts
- First Unitarian Congregational Society, a Unitarian Universalist congregation in Brooklyn, New York
- Unitarian Universalist Religious Society of Spain, an attempt to organize Unitarian Universalism in Spain
