= Theodotus of Byzantium =

Late 2nd century Greek Christian writer

Theodotus of Byzantium (Ancient Greek: Θεόδοτος Theodotos; also known as Theodotus the Tanner, Theodotus the Shoemaker, Theodotus the Cobbler, and Theodotus the Fuller; flourished late 2nd century) was a dynamic monarchian theologian from Byzantium, one of several named Theodotus whose writings were condemned as heresy in the early church.

Theodotus held the profession of a leatherworker or fuller in Byzantium. He taught that Jesus was a virgin born man and, though he (Jesus) later received the spirit of God upon baptism (that is to say, he received the Christ in the form of a dove, thus according to Hippolytus agreed with Gnostics), he was not himself God until after his resurrection. This Christology, now referred to as "Dynamic Monarchianism" by modern scholars, was declared heretical by Pope Victor I, and Theodotus was excommunicated. Eusebius in referencing Theodotus' beliefs, refers to the group calling the correct "preaching [to] have been delayed" ultimately "until the times of Victor". He argued that " if Victor agreed with their opinions", why were they cast out? Meanwhile, Hippolytus lists Theodotus's denial of Christ during persecution as the reason for his beliefs.

Ultimately, Theodotus' following seems to have been quite small, and later having a "fruitless attempt" at establishing a church in Rome.

== See also ==
- Artemon
- Beryllus of Bostra
- Paul of Samosata
- Photinus
- Natalius

== Sources ==
- Lampe P, Johnson MD. Steinhauser M. (trans.) From Paul to Valentinus: Christians at Rome in the First Two Centuries Published by Fortress Press, 2003 Chapter 33: The Theodotians p. 344-9 ISBN 0-8006-2702-4 ISBN 978-0-8006-2702-7
