= First Unitarian Church of Marietta =

Historic church in Ohio, United States

- First Unitarian Church Of Marietta
- U.S. National Register of Historic Places
- U.S. Historic district – Contributing property
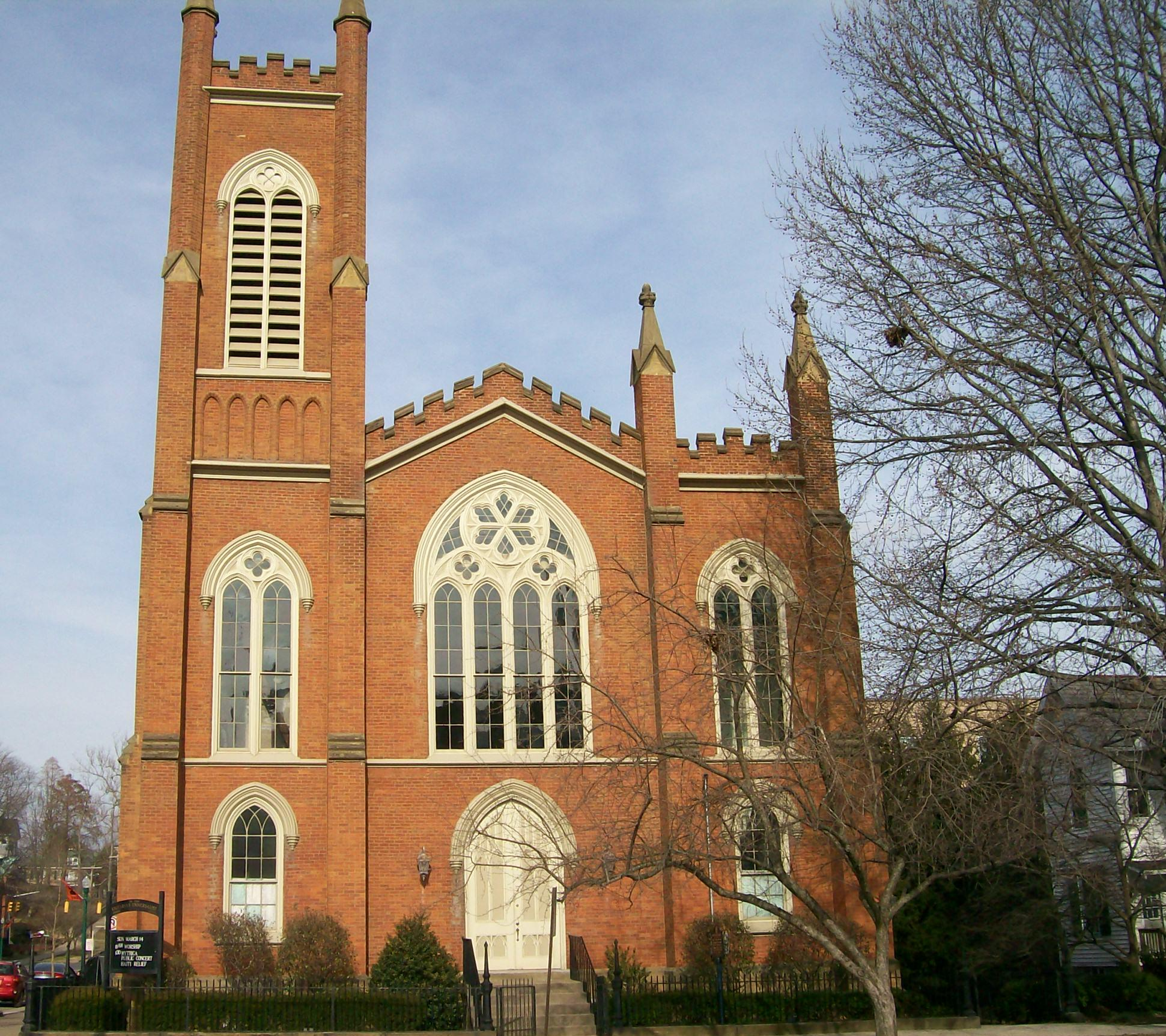
- Front of the church

- Location within Ohio Location within the United States
- Location: 232 3rd St., Marietta, Ohio
- Coordinates: 39°24′58″N 81°27′11″W
- Area: Less than 1 acre (0.40 ha)
- Built: 1855
- Architect: John M. Slocomb
- Architectural style: Gothic Revival
- Part of: Marietta Historic District (ID74001646)
- NRHP reference No.: 73001548
- Added to NRHP: October 3, 1973

The First Unitarian Church of Marietta is a historic Unitarian Universalist church in the city of Marietta, Ohio, United States. Founded in 1869, it uses a building constructed in 1858 for one of its two predecessor churches; this building's high-quality architecture has led to its designation as a historic site.

In January 1830, Nahum Ward published an advertisement in the Marietta Intelligencer seeking to find other friends of liberal religion, and the resulting group organized as a Unitarian church in the following month. Members laid the cornerstone of their building in July 1855, and by the time of the building's dedication in June 1857, the congregation had paid approximately $25,000 for lot, materials, furnishings, and labor. The original form of the congregation ceased to exist in May 1869 at its merger with the city's Universalist church, which itself had been founded in 1817 but suffered severe damage to its property in an 1860 flood. The combined church took the name of "First Universalist Church of Marietta".

Built of brick on a stone foundation and featuring additional elements of stone, the First Unitarian Church is a Gothic Revival building. Pilasters divide the facade into three bay, with the doorway in the center, and the side is divided into five. The left bay of the facade, from the perspective of a viewer on the street, is occupied by the base of a square tower nearly twice the height of the rest of the building; while shorter windows in the tower and facade sit below similar second-story windows, and the side windows occupy the height of both stories, tall third-story windows are set near the top of the tower, and the pilasters on all four corners of the tower, similar to those on the rest of the building, are crowned with pointed pinnacles. The building's general shape is that of a front-gable rectangle, with small-size crenellations atop the edges, and the Gothic Revival style is typified by the ogive windows and doorways in the facade and side. Constructed under the direction of architect John M. Slocomb, the building is one of the region's earliest extant Gothic Revival churches. Both stonework and brickwork were completed by local craftsmen, the bricks being made from clay extracted from Sacra Via, the ceremonial walls built by the Mound Builders near the edge of the Muskingum River.

In October 1973, the church was listed on the National Register of Historic Places, qualifying both because of its architecture and its close connection to Nahum Ward, who was deemed a significant resident of nineteenth-century Marietta. It was the last of four Marietta locations to be listed on the Register in 1973, following the Mound Cemetery Mound in February and the Wilcox-Mills House and Erwin Hall at Marietta College in April. It is also a part of the Marietta Historic District, listed on the Register in 1974, which embraces more than two thousand buildings across 900 acres (360 ha) of the city.
