= First Unitarian Church (Peabody, Massachusetts) =

Historic church in Massachusetts, United States

- U.S. National Register of Historic Places
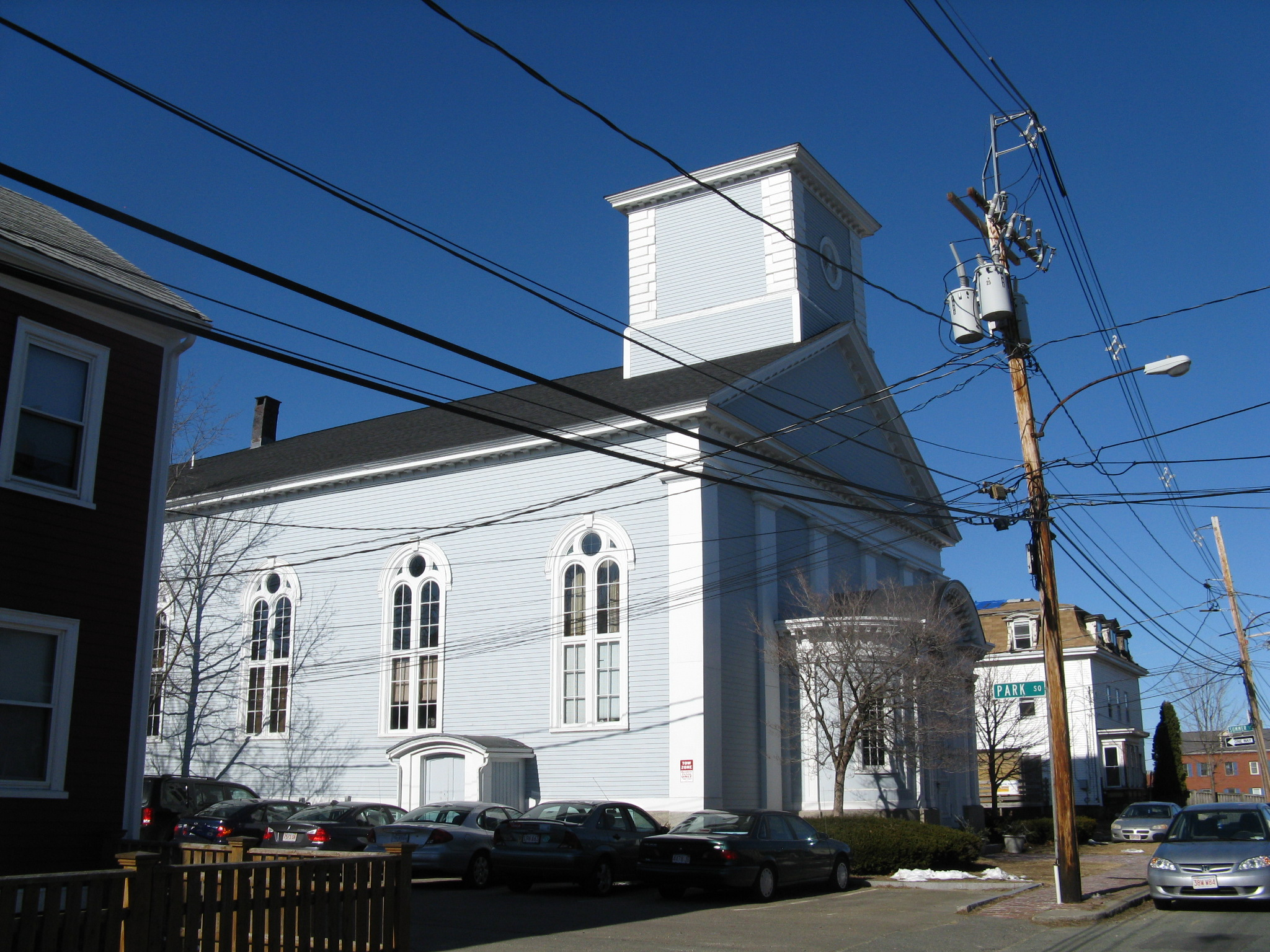
- First Unitarian Church

- Location within Massachusetts Location within the United States
- Location: 7 Park Street, Peabody, Massachusetts
- Coordinates: 42°31′28″N 70°55′38″W
- Built: 1872
- Architectural style: Greek Revival, Italianate
- NRHP reference No.: 88001091
- Added to NRHP: September 18, 1989

The First Unitarian Church is a historic church in Peabody, Massachusetts. The wood-frame church was built in 1826, when the area was known as South Danvers. The front facade has a projecting rounded entrance hall decorated with pilasters and a heavily bracketed cornice. The main part of the facade also has pilasters rising to a pedimented gable that has large-scale dentil molding. The side walls have six lancet-style windows. The tower, which lacks a steeple, has quoined corners, and molding on the cornice of its roofline that matches that of the main roof.

The church building was listed on the National Register of Historic Places in 1989. It has been converted to condominiums.

== See also ==
- National Register of Historic Places listings in Essex County, Massachusetts
