= First Unitarian Church (Iowa City, Iowa) =

- U.S. National Register of Historic Places
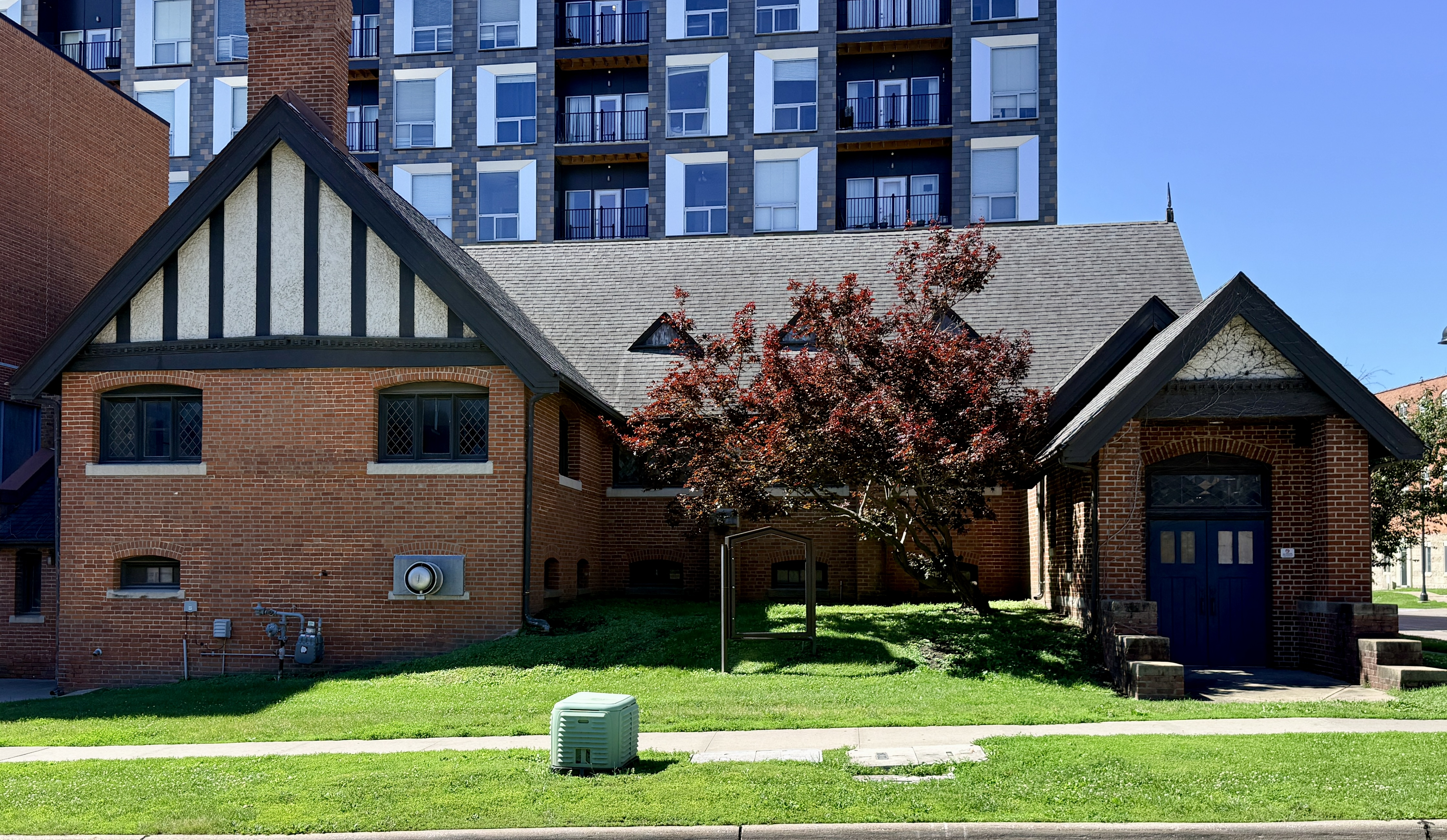
- Former First Unitarian in 2026

- Location within Iowa Location within the United States
- Location: 10 S. Gilbert St. Iowa City, Iowa
- Coordinates: 41°39′39.4″N 91°31′47.7″W
- Area: less than one acre
- Built: 1908
- Architectural style: Tudor Revival
- NRHP reference No.: 100002996
- Added to NRHP: October 5, 2018

First Unitarian Church is a historic building located in the downtown area of Iowa City, Iowa, United States. The local Universalist congregation traces its beginnings to 1841. Their building at Iowa Avenue and Dubuque Street was destroyed in a fire in 1868, and they built a larger building at Iowa Avenue and Clinton Street. In 1881 the Universalists merged with the local Unitarian Society. In their arrangement, the Unitarians paid for the minister while the Universalists owned the church building. The University of Iowa bought their building in 1907 and renamed it Unity Hall for use as a student union. The Unitarian-Universalist congregation dedicated this Tudor Revival building for their use on October 24, 1908. The dedication address was given by Rev. Eleanor E. Gordon, who was the secretary of the State Unitarian Conference of Iowa at the time. Because of their growth and costs to update the old building, the congregation voted in 2015 to build a new structure in near-by Coralville. They sold this building to developer Jesse Allen. It has subsequently been used as a winter shelter for the homeless while plans were made to include it in a new commercial-residential development. The former church building was listed on the National Register of Historic Places in 2018.
