= Unitarian =

Unitarian or Unitarianism may refer to:

== Christian and Christian-derived theologies ==
A Unitarian is a follower of, or a member of an organisation that follows, any of several theologies referred to as Unitarianism:

- Unitarianism (1565–present), a liberal Christian theological movement known for its belief in the unitary nature of God, and for its rejection of the doctrines of the Trinity, original sin, predestination, and of biblical inerrancy
- Unitarian Universalism (often referring to themselves as "UUs" or "Unitarians"), a primarily North American liberal pluralistic religious movement that grew out of Unitarianism
- In everyday British usage, "Unitarian" refers to the organisation formally known as the General Assembly of Unitarian and Free Christian Churches, which holds beliefs similar to Unitarian Universalists
- International Council of Unitarians and Universalists, an umbrella organization
- American Unitarian Association, a religious denomination in the United States and Canada, formed in 1825 and consolidated in 1961 with the Universalist Church of America to form the Unitarian Universalist Association
- Canadian Unitarian Council, an institution that joined the Unitarian Universalist Association in 1961 and left by agreement in 2002 to provide almost all equivalent services for Unitarian Universalists in Canada
- Biblical Unitarianism, a scripture-fundamentalist non-Trinitarian movement (flourished c.1876-1929)
- Nontrinitarianism, a generic name for a Christian point of view that rejects the Trinity doctrine

== Other religious theologies ==
- The English translation of the Arabic term موحد Muwaḥḥid (plural موحدون Muwaḥḥidūn), alternately meaning "monotheist", which may refer to:
  - The Almohad Caliphate, a dynasty and movement in the Maghreb and Al-Andalus
  - The endonym of the Druze people, a monotheistic ethnoreligious community, found primarily in Syria, Lebanon, Israel and Jordan
  - The self-description of many Salafi and Wahhabi groups
  - An endonym of the Unitarian Bahá’ís, a Bahá’í division centred on a revival of the claims of Mirza Muhammad Ali

== Politics ==
- Political unitarism, concepts that enforce fully unified government.
- Unitary state, a political system where a country is governed as one single unit
- A member of the Unitarian Party of Argentine history
- A period of the Argentine Civil War, the Unitarian-Federalist War: 1828–31

== Other uses ==
- A scholar who holds that the works of Homer were composed by a single individual (see Homeric scholarship)

== See also ==
- Unification Church
- Unity Church
- United Reform Church
