= Antipope Natalius =

3rd century priest from Rome

- Church: Adoptionism
- Installed: c. 199
- Term ended: c. 200
- Predecessor: Roman claimant: Victor I Zephyrinus; Antipapal claimant: Antipapacy established
- Successor: Roman claimant: Zephyrinus; Antipapal claimant: Hippolytus of Rome
- Opposed to: Pope Zephyrinus

Natalius was a figure in early church history who is sometimes considered to be the first antipope of his birthplace of Rome.

The only information about Natalius is a quote from an unnamed earlier writer by Eusebius, telling of a 3rd-century priest who accepted the bishopric of the Adoptionists, which was seen as a heretical group in Rome. Natalius soon repented and tearfully begged Pope Zephyrinus to receive him into communion.

According to the accounts, Natalius became the head of this Christian community, due to the influence of the theologians, Asclepiodotus and Theodotus the Younger, disciples of Theodotus of Byzantium. The latter Theodotus had been excommunicated in 190 by Pope Victor I for his teachings, and this caused a schism, albeit of small proportions, within the Church. Theodotus, a leather merchant and a scholar of Greek culture, argued that Jesus was at first an ordinary man, in whom the Logos, God or the Wisdom of God dwelt "as in a temple", as it had been with Moses and the prophets. This had happened at his baptism, when he received the divine grace or adoption (dynamis) and thus became equally divine, his divinity being inferior to that of the Father (God or Logos). This doctrine, called dynamic monarchianism, was both Ebionistic and Adhocianistic.

== See also ==
- List of papal elections
- Papal conclave
- Papal selection before 1059
