= Heilprin =

Origin
- Languages: Jewish (Yiddish, German language)

Other names
- Variant forms: Heilbronn, Heilbron, Heilbronner, Heilbroner, Heilpern, Halpern, Halper, Halperin, Alperin, Galperin, Gelperin, Halpert, Alper, Alperovich, Alpers, Alpert, Alperovitch, Alperowicz, Alperovitz

Heilprin (Hebrew: היילפרין) is a Jewish surname with many variants.

== Origins ==
Some people with the name derive it from the town of Heilbronn, Germany. "Heilbronn" means "healing well".

Besides the numerous Heilbrons, Heilbronners, Heilpruns, and Heilbruns who are known to have lived between the middle of the 16th century and the present time, there are four distinct branches of the Heilprin family. The progenitor of the oldest of these was Zebulun Eliezer (b. 1541), whose son, Moses of Brest-Litovsk, was a brother-in-law of Samuel Edels (Eideles) (died 1632).

The genealogy of another branch, which includes several rabbis and prominent leaders of communities and of the Council of Four Lands, is as follows:

The genealogy of a third branch is that made by Belinson of the family of Jehiel ben Solomon Heilprin, who went from Brody in 1821 to Odessa, where he was dayyan until 1835; he then succeeded Reuben Hardenstein in the rabbinate of Odessa, which Heilprin held until his death, January 13, 1877. The places following the names in the following family tree denote in most instances the rabbinates.

The fourth branch is that of Jehiel ben Solomon ben Jekuthiel of Minsk, author of "Seder ha-Dorot", whose son Moses succeeded him in the rabbinate and whose grandson, Löb b. Isaac, published his work. Jehiel was probably related to the third branch of the Heilprin family. A large number of the Heilprins now living in Russia claim descent from Jehiel. Phineas Mendel, father of Michael Heilprin, was also probably descended from one of the several prominent Heilprins who lived in his native city, Lublin.

Heilprins are to be found in almost all Ashkenazic communities, but they are not necessarily of the same family, since most of the family names borne by the Jews of Austria, Germany, and eastern Europe were assumed indiscriminately by order of their respective governments toward the end of the 18th century or at the beginning of the 19th.

== People with the surname Heilprin ==
- Angelo Heilprin (1853–1907), Hungarian-American naturalist, geologist, and traveler; son of Michael Heilprin
- Ben Shlomo Lipman-Heilprin (1902–1968), Israeli physician
- Elchanan Heilprin (1921–2015), rabbi
- Jehiel ben Solomon Heilprin (ca. 1660 – ca. 1746), Lithuanian rabbi, kabalist, and chronicler
- Louis Heilprin (1851–1912), Hungarian-American encyclopedist; son of Michael Heilprin
- Louis Heilprin Pollak (1922–2012), United States District Judge and dean of Yale Law School and the University of Pennsylvania Law School; great-grandson of Michael Heilprin
- Michael Heilprin (1823–1888), Polish-Hungarian Jewish biblical scholar, critic, and writer, father of Angelo and Louis
- Phineas Mendel Heilprin (1801–1863), Polish-Hungarian-US Hebraist; father of Michael Heilprin, grandfather of Louis and Angelo
- Walter Heilprin Pollak (1887–1940), American civil liberties lawyer; grandson of Michael Heilprin, father of Louis Heilprin Pollak
- Uriel Heilperin, better known under his pen name Yonatan Ratosh (1908–1981), Israeli poet, leader of the Canaanite movement

== See also ==
- Heilprin Glacier
