= September 26 =

September 26 this year in various calendars
- Saturday, 26 September 2026
Akan	Fomemene
Armenian	8 Sahmi 1476
Aztec	Tititl 19, 13 Mazātl
Babylonian	13 Ululu, 2337 SE
Balinese pawukon	Menga, Pasah, Sri, Umanis, Tungleh, Saniscara of Bala, Ludra, Dangu, Sri
Bengali	11 Ashshin, BS 1433
Chinese	Yin Water Rabbit・Girl Mansion; Fire Horse Year, Month 8, Day 16 (Qiufen, 12 days until Hanlu)
Common Era	26 September 2026 CE
Coptic	16 Thout, AM 1743
Egyptian	13 Mechir, 2775 NE
Ethiopian	16 Maskaram, 2019 Amätä Məhrät
French Republican	Décade I, Quartidi de Vendémiaire de l'Année 235 de la République
Gregorian	26 September, AD 2026
Hebrew	15 Tishrei, AM 5787
Hindu	Pūrvabhādrapada・Gaṇḍa; Solar: 10 Āśvina, 1948 SE; Lunisolar: Pūrṇimā, Śukla pakṣa of Bhādrapada, 2083 VE; Rāudra・5127 KY・1,872,844
Icelandic	Laugardagur, 3 Haustmánuður 2026
Islamic	13 Rabi' al-thani, AH 1448 (using tabular method)
ISO week date	2026-W39-6
Japanese	16 Hazuki, Reiwa 8 (Shūbun, 12 days until Kanro)
Julian	13 September, AD 2026 (AM 7534)
Julian day	2461310
Korean	16 Dakdal, 4359 DE
Maya	13.0.13.17.7; 0 Yax, 13 Manik
Roman	Idibus Septembribus, MMDCCLXXIX AUC
Solar Hijri	4 Mehr, SH 1405
Tibetan	15 khrums, me pho rta 2153 or 1772 or 1000

<<	September					>>
Su	Mo	Tu	We	Th	Fr	Sa
		1	2	3	4	5
6	7	8	9	10	11	12
13	14	15	16	17	18	19
20	21	22	23	24	25	26
27	28	29	30
2026

September 26 in recent years
2026 (Saturday)
2025 (Friday)
2024 (Thursday)
2023 (Tuesday)
2022 (Monday)
2021 (Sunday)
2020 (Saturday)
2019 (Thursday)
2018 (Wednesday)
2017 (Tuesday)

September 26 is the 269th day of the year (270th in leap years) in the Gregorian calendar; 96 days remain until the end of the year.

== Events ==
=== Pre-1600 ===
- 46 BC – Julius Caesar dedicates a temple to Venus Genetrix, fulfilling a vow he made at the Battle of Pharsalus.
- 715 – Ragenfrid defeats Theudoald at the Battle of Compiègne.
- 1087 – William II is crowned King of England, and reigns until 1100.
- 1142 – Stephen of Blois's army approaches Oxford, beginning the siege of Oxford.
- 1143 – Election of pope Celestine II following the death of pope Innocent II.
- 1212 – The Golden Bull of Sicily is issued to confirm the hereditary royal title in Bohemia for the Přemyslid dynasty.
- 1345 – Friso-Hollandic Wars: Frisians defeat Holland in the Battle of Warns.
- 1371 – Serbian–Turkish wars: Ottoman Turks fight against a Serbian army at the Battle of Maritsa.
- 1423 – Hundred Years' War: A French army defeats the English at the Battle of La Brossinière.
- 1493 – Pope Alexander VI issues the papal bull Dudum siquidem to the Spanish, extending the grant of new lands he made them in Inter caetera.
- 1580 – Francis Drake finishes his circumnavigation of the Earth in Plymouth, England.

=== 1601–1900 ===
- 1687 – Morean War: The Parthenon in Athens, used as a gunpowder depot by the Ottoman garrison, is partially destroyed after being bombarded during the Siege of the Acropolis by Venetian forces.
- 1688 – The city council of Amsterdam votes to support William of Orange's invasion of England, which became the Glorious Revolution.
- 1777 – American Revolutionary War: British troops capture and begin the occupation of Philadelphia, which had been serving as the American capital city, during the Philadelphia campaign.
- 1789 – George Washington appoints Thomas Jefferson the first United States Secretary of State.
- 1799 – War of the 2nd Coalition: French troops defeat Austro-Russian forces, leading to the collapse of Suvorov's campaign.
- 1810 – A new Act of Succession is adopted by the Riksdag of the Estates, and Jean Baptiste Bernadotte becomes heir to the Swedish throne.

=== 1901–present ===
- 1905 – Albert Einstein publishes the third of his Annus Mirabilis papers, introducing the special theory of relativity.
- 1907 – Four months after the 1907 Imperial Conference, New Zealand and Newfoundland are promoted from colonies to dominions within the British Empire.
- 1914 – The United States Federal Trade Commission is established by the Federal Trade Commission Act.
- 1917 – World War I: The Battle of Polygon Wood begins.
- 1918 – World War I: The Meuse-Argonne Offensive began which would last until the total surrender of German forces.
- 1919 – Ukrainian War of Independence: The Revolutionary Insurgent Army of Ukraine defeats the White Russian Volunteer Army at the Battle of Peregonovka.
- 1923 – The German government calls off the passive resistance to the French and Belgian occupation of the Ruhr.
- 1933 – As gangster Machine Gun Kelly surrenders to the FBI, he shouts out, "Don't shoot, G-Men!", which becomes a nickname for FBI agents.
- 1936 – Spanish Civil War: Lluis Companys reshuffles the Generalitat de Catalunya, with the marxist POUM and anarcho-syndicalist CNT joining the government.
- 1942 – Holocaust: Senior SS official August Frank issues a memorandum detailing how Jews should be "evacuated".
- 1950 – Korean War: United Nations troops recapture Seoul from North Korean forces.
- 1953 – Rationing of sugar in the United Kingdom ends.
- 1954 – The Japanese rail ferry Tōya Maru sinks during a typhoon in the Tsugaru Strait, Japan, killing 1,172.
- 1959 – Typhoon Vera, the strongest typhoon to hit Japan in recorded history, makes landfall, killing 4,580 people and leaving nearly 1.6 million others homeless.
- 1960 – In Chicago, the first televised debate takes place between presidential candidates Richard M. Nixon and John F. Kennedy.
- 1978 – Air Caribbean Flight 309 crashes in Residencial Las Casas in San Juan, Puerto Rico, killing six.
- 1980 – A terrorist bombing at the Oktoberfest in Munich, Germany, kills 13 people and injures 213 others.
- 1983 – Soviet Air Force officer Stanislav Petrov identifies a report of an incoming nuclear missile as a computer error and not an American first strike, thus preventing nuclear war.
- 1983 – Soyuz 7K-ST No. 16L, intended to launch a crew to the Salyut 7 space station, explodes on the launch pad. The launch escape system is activated before the Soyuz-U rocket explodes, saving the crew.
- 1984 – The United Kingdom and China agree to a transfer of sovereignty over Hong Kong, to take place in 1997.
- 1992 – A Nigerian Air Force Lockheed C-130 Hercules crashes in Ejigbo, Lagos, killing 159.
- 1994 – A Yakovlev Yak-40 crashes into a river near Vanavara, Russia, killing 24.
- 1997 – A Garuda Indonesia Airbus A300 crashes near Medan airport, killing 234.
- 1997 – An earthquake strikes the Italian regions of Umbria and the Marche, causing part of the Basilica of St. Francis at Assisi to collapse.
- 2000 – Anti-globalization protests in Prague (some 20,000 protesters) turn violent during the IMF and World Bank summits.
- 2000 – The MS Express Samina sinks off Paros in the Aegean Sea killing 80 passengers.
- 2002 – The overcrowded Senegalese ferry, MV Le Joola, capsizes off the coast of the Gambia killing more than 1,000.
- 2009 – Typhoon Ketsana hits the Philippines, China, Vietnam, Cambodia, Laos and Thailand, causing 700 fatalities.
- 2010 – The Philippine Bar exam bombing occurs near the De La Salle University in Taft Avenue, Manila injuring 47 people.
- 2014 – A mass kidnapping of 43 students from a teaching college occurs in Iguala, Mexico.
- 2022 – A mass shooting occurs at a school in Izhevsk, Udmurtia, Russia, resulting in the deaths of 18 people, including 11 children.
- 2024 – Hurricane Helene makes landfall in Perry, Florida as a Category 4 hurricane, killing over 250 people, causing US$78.7 billion in damage and becoming the deadliest hurricane in the mainland United States since Katrina.

== Births ==
=== Pre-1600 ===
- 932 – Al-Mu'izz li-Din Allah, Arab caliph (died 975)
- 1329 – Anne of Bavaria, German queen consort (died 1353)
- 1406 – Thomas de Ros, 8th Baron de Ros, English soldier and politician (died 1430)
- 1462 – Engelbert, Count of Nevers, younger son of John I, Duke of Cleves (died 1506)
- 1526 – Wolfgang, Count Palatine of Zweibrücken (died 1569)

=== 1601–1900 ===
- 1637 – Sébastien Leclerc, French painter (died 1714)
- 1641 – Nehemiah Grew, English plant anatomist and physiologist (died 1712)
- 1651 – Francis Daniel Pastorius, founder of Germantown, Philadelphia (died 1720)
- 1660 – George William, Duke of Liegnitz (died 1675)
- 1698 – William Cavendish, 3rd Duke of Devonshire (died 1755)
- 1711 – Richard Grenville-Temple, 2nd Earl Temple, English politician, First Lord of the Admiralty (died 1779)
- 1750 – Cuthbert Collingwood, 1st Baron Collingwood, English admiral (died 1810)
- 1758 – Cosme Argerich, Argentinian physician (died 1820)
- 1767 – Wenzel Müller, Austrian composer and conductor (died 1835)
- 1774 – Johnny Appleseed, American gardener and environmentalist (died 1845)
- 1783 – Richard Griffin, 3rd Baron Braybrooke, English politician and literary figure (died 1858)
- 1791 – Théodore Géricault, French painter and lithographer (died 1824)
- 1792 – William Hobson, Irish-New Zealand explorer and politician, 1st Governor of New Zealand (died 1842)
- 1820 – Ishwar Chandra Vidyasagar, Indian philosopher, painter, and academic (died 1891)
- 1840 – Louis-Olivier Taillon, Canadian lawyer and politician, 8th Premier of Quebec (died 1923)
- 1843 – Joseph Furphy, Australian author and poet (died 1912)
- 1848 – Henry Walters, American art collector and philanthropist (died 1931)
- 1849 – Ivan Pavlov, Russian physiologist and physician, Nobel Prize laureate (died 1936)
- 1856 – Anna Paaske, Norwegian opera singer and music teacher (died 1935)
- 1865 – Archibald Butt, United States Army Officer (died 1912)
- 1865 – Mary Russell, Duchess of Bedford (died 1937)
- 1869 – Komitas, Armenian-French priest and composer (died 1935)
- 1870 – Christian X of Denmark (died 1947)
- 1872 – Max Ehrmann, American poet and lawyer (died 1945)
- 1873 – Wacław Berent, Polish author and translator (died 1940)
- 1874 – Lewis Hine, American photographer and activist (died 1940)
- 1874 – Charles Vyner Brooke, 3rd Raj of Sarawak (died 1963)
- 1875 – Edmund Gwenn, English-American actor (died 1959)
- 1876 – Edith Abbott, American economist, social worker, and author (died 1957)
- 1876 – Ghulam Bhik Nairang, Indian poet, lawyer, and politician (died 1952)
- 1877 – Ugo Cerletti, Italian neurologist and academic (died 1963)
- 1877 – Alfred Cortot, Swiss pianist and conductor (died 1962)
- 1877 – Bertha De Vriese, Belgian physician (died 1958)
- 1878 – Walter Steinbeck, German actor (died 1942)
- 1884 – Jack Bickell, Canadian businessman and philanthropist (died 1951)
- 1886 – Archibald Hill, English physiologist, academic, and politician, Nobel Prize laureate (died 1977)
- 1887 – Edwin Keppel Bennett, English author and poet (died 1958)
- 1887 – Antonio Moreno, Spanish-American actor and director (died 1967)
- 1887 – Barnes Wallis, English scientist and engineer, invented the Bouncing bomb (died 1979)
- 1888 – J. Frank Dobie, American journalist and author (died 1964)
- 1888 – T. S. Eliot, English poet, playwright, critic, Nobel Prize laureate (died 1965)
- 1889 – Gordon Brewster, Irish cartoonist (died 1946)
- 1889 – Martin Heidegger, German philosopher and academic (died 1976)
- 1889 – Abdulkadir Inan, Bashkir/Turkish Turkologist (died 1976)
- 1890 – Jack Tresadern, English footballer and manager (died 1959)
- 1891 – William McKell, Australian politician, 12th Governor General of Australia (died 1985)
- 1891 – Charles Münch, French violinist and conductor (died 1968)
- 1891 – Hans Reichenbach, German philosopher from the Vienna Circle (died 1953)
- 1892 – Robert Staughton Lynd, American sociologist and academic (died 1970)
- 1894 – Gladys Brockwell, American actress (died 1929)
- 1895 – Jürgen Stroop, German general (died 1952)
- 1897 – Pope Paul VI (died 1978)
- 1897 – Arthur Rhys-Davids, English lieutenant and pilot (died 1917)
- 1898 – George Gershwin, American pianist and composer (died 1937)
- 1900 – Suzanne Belperron, French jewelry designer (died 1983)

=== 1901–present ===
- 1901 – George Raft, American actor, singer, and dancer (died 1980)
- 1901 – Ted Weems, American bandleader and musician (died 1963)
- 1902 – Albert Anastasia, Italian-American mobster (died 1957)
- 1905 – Millito Navarro, Puerto Rican baseball player (died 2011)
- 1905 – Karl Rappan, Austrian footballer and coach (died 1996)
- 1907 – Anthony Blunt, English historian and spy (died 1983)
- 1907 – Shug Fisher, American singer-songwriter, musician, actor, and comedian (died 1984)
- 1907 – Bep van Klaveren, Dutch boxer (died 1992)
- 1909 – Bill France Sr., American race car driver, founded NASCAR (died 1992)
- 1909 – A. P. Hamann, American lieutenant, lawyer, and politician (died 1977)
- 1911 – Al Helfer, American sportscaster (died 1975)
- 1913 – Frank Brimsek, American ice hockey player (died 1998)
- 1914 – Achille Compagnoni, Italian skier and mountaineer (died 2009)
- 1914 – Jack LaLanne, American fitness expert (died 2011)
- 1917 – Réal Caouette, Canadian journalist and politician (died 1976)
- 1917 – Tran Duc Thao, Vietnamese-French philosopher and theorist (died 1993)
- 1918 – Eric Morley, English businessman and television host, founded the Miss World (died 2000)
- 1919 – Barbara Britton, American actress (died 1980)
- 1919 – Matilde Camus, Spanish poet and author (died 2012)
- 1922 – Takis Miliadis, Greek actor (died 1985)
- 1922 – Nicholas Romanov, Prince of Russia (died 2014)
- 1923 – Dev Anand, Indian actor, director, producer, and screenwriter (died 2011)
- 1923 – Hugh Griffiths, Baron Griffiths, English cricketer, lawyer, and judge (died 2015)
- 1923 – James Hennessy, English businessman and diplomat (died 2024)
- 1924 – Jean Hoerni, Swiss physicist, inventor and businessman (died 1997)
- 1925 – Norm Dussault, American-Canadian ice hockey player (died 2012)
- 1925 – Marty Robbins, American singer-songwriter, guitarist, actor, and race car driver (died 1982)
- 1926 – Julie London, American singer and actress (died 2000)
- 1926 – Manfred Mayrhofer, Austrian philologist and academic (died 2011)
- 1927 – Robert Cade, American physician and educator, co-invented Gatorade (died 2007)
- 1927 – Patrick O'Neal, American actor (died 1994)
- 1927 – Enzo Bearzot, Italian footballer and manager (died 2010)
- 1928 – Bob Van der Veken, Belgian actor (died 2019)
- 1928 – Wilford White, American football player (died 2013)
- 1930 – Philip Bosco, American actor (died 2018)
- 1930 – Joe Brown, English mountaineer and author (died 2020)
- 1931 – Kenneth Parnell, American sex offender (died 2008)
- 1932 – Donna Douglas, American actress (died 2015)
- 1932 – Joyce Jameson, American actress (died 1987)
- 1932 – Manmohan Singh, Indian economist and politician, 13th Prime Minister of India (died 2024)
- 1932 – Vladimir Voinovich, Russian author and poet (died 2018)
- 1934 – Neil Coles, English golfer and architect
- 1935 – Bob Barber, English cricketer
- 1935 – Lou Myers, American actor (died 2013)
- 1935 – Joe Sherlock, Irish politician (died 2007)
- 1936 – Leroy Drumm, American sailor and songwriter (died 2010)
- 1936 – Winnie Madikizela-Mandela, South African academic and politician, 8th First Lady of South Africa (died 2018)
- 1937 – Valentin Pavlov, Russian banker and politician, 11th Premier of the Soviet Union (died 2003)
- 1937 – Jerry Weintraub, American film producer and agent (died 2015)
- 1938 – Lucette Aldous, New Zealand-Australian ballerina and educator (died 2021)
- 1938 – Jonathan Goldsmith, American actor
- 1938 – Lars-Jacob Krogh, Norwegian journalist (died 2010)
- 1939 – Ricky Tomlinson, English actor and screenwriter
- 1941 – Salvatore Accardo, Italian violinist and conductor
- 1941 – Martine Beswick, Jamaican-English model and actress
- 1941 – David Frizzell, American country music singer-songwriter and guitarist
- 1942 – Kent McCord, American actor
- 1942 – Gloria E. Anzaldúa, American scholar of Chicana cultural theory (died 2004)
- 1943 – Ian Chappell, Australian cricketer and sportscaster
- 1943 – Tim Schenken, Australian racing driver
- 1944 – Jan Brewer, American politician, 22nd Governor of Arizona
- 1944 – Keith O'Nions, English geologist and academic
- 1944 – Anne Robinson, English journalist and game show host
- 1945 – Louise Beaudoin, Canadian academic and politician
- 1945 – Gal Costa, Brazilian singer (died 2022)
- 1945 – Bryan Ferry, English singer-songwriter
- 1946 – Andrea Dworkin, American activist and author (died 2005)
- 1946 – John MacLachlan Gray, Canadian actor, playwright, and composer
- 1946 – Mary Beth Hurt, American actress (died 2026)
- 1946 – Radha Krishna Mainali, Nepalese politician
- 1946 – Louise Simonson, American author
- 1946 – Claudette Werleigh, Haitian Prime Minister
- 1946 – Christine Todd Whitman, American politician (50th Governor of New Jersey)
- 1947 – Lucius Allen, American basketball player
- 1947 – Lynn Anderson, American singer and actress (died 2015)
- 1947 – Philippe Lavil, French singer and actor
- 1947 – Dick Roth, American swimmer
- 1948 – Olivia Newton-John, English-Australian singer-songwriter and actress (died 2022)
- 1948 – Vladimír Remek, Czech politician, diplomat, cosmonaut and military pilot
- 1949 – Clodoaldo, Brazilian footballer and manager
- 1949 – Wendy Saddington, Australian singer and journalist (died 2013)
- 1949 – Jane Smiley, American novelist
- 1949 – Minette Walters, English journalist and author
- 1950 – Andy Haden, New Zealand rugby player (died 2020)
- 1951 – Tommy Taylor, English footballer and manager
- 1951 – Stuart Tosh, Scottish singer-songwriter and drummer
- 1953 – Dolores Keane, Irish singer and actress
- 1953 – Douglas A. Melton, American biologist and academic
- 1953 – Paul Stephenson, English police officer
- 1954 – Craig Chaquico, American guitarist
- 1954 – Kevin Kennedy, American baseball player, manager, and sportscaster
- 1954 – Cesar Rosas, Mexican-American singer-songwriter and guitarist
- 1955 – Carlene Carter, American singer-songwriter
- 1956 – Steve Butler, American race car driver and engineer
- 1956 – Linda Hamilton, American actress
- 1957 – Bob Staake, American author and illustrator
- 1957 – Klaus Augenthaler, German footballer and manager
- 1957 – Michael Dweck, American photographer and director
- 1957 – Oscar Andrade, Brazilian politician (died 2026)
- 1958 – Rudi Cerne, German figure skater and journalist
- 1958 – Darby Crash, American singer-songwriter (died 1980)
- 1958 – Robert Kagan, Greek-American historian and author
- 1958 – Kenny Sansom, English footballer
- 1958 – Richard B. Weldon Jr., American sailor and politician
- 1959 – Andrew Bolt, Australian journalist
- 1959 – Trevor Dodds, Namibian golfer
- 1959 – Rich Gedman, American baseball player and coach
- 1959 – Ilya Kormiltsev, Russian poet and translator (died 2007)
- 1960 – Uwe Bein, German footballer and manager
- 1960 – Jouke de Vries, Dutch academic and politician
- 1960 – Doug Supernaw, American country music singer-songwriter and guitarist (died 2020)
- 1961 – Jeanie Buss, American sports executive
- 1961 – Cindy Herron, American singer-songwriter and actress
- 1961 – Marianne Mikko, Estonian journalist and politician
- 1961 – Will Self, English novelist and journalist
- 1962 – Melissa Sue Anderson, American-Canadian actress
- 1962 – Jonas Bergqvist, Swedish ice hockey player
- 1962 – Mark Haddon, English author and poet
- 1962 – Steve Moneghetti, Australian runner
- 1962 – Al Pitrelli, American guitarist and songwriter
- 1962 – Tracey Thorn, English singer-songwriter and writer
- 1962 – Jacky Wu, Taiwanese singer, actor, and television host
- 1963 – Lysette Anthony, English actress and producer
- 1963 – Joe Nemechek, American race car driver
- 1964 – Dave Martinez, American baseball player and coach
- 1965 – Radisav Ćurčić, Serbian-Israeli basketball player
- 1965 – Petro Poroshenko, Ukrainian businessman and politician, 5th President of Ukraine
- 1966 – Jillian Barberie, Canadian actress and sportscaster
- 1966 – Christos Dantis, Greek singer-songwriter and producer
- 1966 – Shane Dye, New Zealand jockey
- 1966 – Craig Heyward, American football player (died 2006)
- 1967 – Bruno Akrapović, Bosnian footballer and manager
- 1967 – Shannon Hoon, American singer-songwriter and guitarist (died 1995)
- 1967 – Craig Janney, American ice hockey player
- 1968 – Jim Caviezel, American actor
- 1968 – Ben Shenkman, American actor
- 1969 – Andy Petterson, Australian footballer and coach
- 1969 – David Slade, English director and producer
- 1969 – Holger Stanislawski, German footballer and manager
- 1969 – Paul Warhurst, English footballer and manager
- 1970 – Daryl Beattie, Australian motorcycle racer
- 1970 – Sheri Moon Zombie, American actress and fashion designer
- 1970 – David Parland, Swedish guitarist (died 2013)
- 1972 – Ras Kass, American rapper and producer
- 1972 – Beto O'Rourke, American politician
- 1972 – Shawn Stockman, American singer
- 1973 – Marty Casey, American singer-songwriter and guitarist
- 1973 – Julienne Davis, American actress, producer, and screenwriter
- 1973 – Dr. Luke, American record producer and songwriter
- 1973 – Chris Small, Scottish snooker player and coach
- 1973 – Olga Vasdeki, Greek triple jumper
- 1974 – Boris Cepeda, German-Ecuadorian pianist and diplomat
- 1974 – Gary Hall Jr., American swimmer
- 1974 – Martin Müürsepp, Estonian basketball player and coach
- 1975 – Emma Härdelin, Swedish singer and violinist
- 1975 – Jake Paltrow, American director and screenwriter
- 1975 – Chiara Schoras, German actress
- 1976 – Michael Ballack, German footballer
- 1976 – Sami Vänskä, Finnish bass player
- 1977 – Kerem Özyeğen, Turkish singer-songwriter and guitarist
- 1977 – Aka Plu, Japanese comedian and actor
- 1978 – Robert Kipkoech Cheruiyot, Kenyan runner
- 1979 – Chris Kunitz, Canadian ice hockey player
- 1979 – Naomichi Marufuji, Japanese wrestler
- 1979 – Fuifui Moimoi, Tongan-New Zealand rugby league player
- 1979 – Cameron Mooney, Australian footballer
- 1979 – Jaycie Phelps, American gymnast
- 1979 – Taavi Rõivas, Estonian politician, 16th Prime Minister of Estonia
- 1979 – Jacob Tierney, Canadian actor, director, and screenwriter
- 1980 – Patrick Friesacher, Austrian racing driver
- 1980 – Brooks Orpik, American ice hockey player
- 1980 – Daniel Sedin, Swedish ice hockey player
- 1980 – Henrik Sedin, Swedish ice hockey player
- 1981 – Asuka, Japanese professional wrestler
- 1981 – Yao Beina, Chinese singer (died 2015)
- 1981 – Christina Milian, American singer-songwriter, dancer, and actress
- 1981 – Ayumi Tsunematsu, Japanese voice actress
- 1981 – Serena Williams, American tennis player
- 1982 – Rob Burrow, English rugby player (died 2024)
- 1982 – John Scott, Canadian ice hockey player
- 1982 – Sun Li, Chinese actress
- 1983 – Ricardo Quaresma, Portuguese footballer
- 1984 – Nev Schulman, American photographer, television host, and producer
- 1985 – Talulah Riley, English actress
- 1986 – Sean Doolittle, American baseball player
- 1987 – Rosanna Munter, Swedish singer-songwriter
- 1988 – Chris Archer, American baseball player
- 1988 – James Blake, English singer-songwriter and producer
- 1988 – Kiira Korpi, Finnish figure skater
- 1988 – Buddy Matthews, Australian wrestler
- 1989 – Jonny Bairstow, English cricketer
- 1991 – Alma Jodorowsky, French actress, fashion model and singer
- 1991 – Dan Preston, English footballer
- 1992 – Yoo Ara, South Korean singer and actress
- 1993 – Rosicleide Andrade, Brazilian Paralympic judoka
- 1993 – Michael Kidd-Gilchrist, American basketball player
- 1994 – Jack Conger, American swimmer
- 1995 – Miloš Veljković, Serbian footballer
- 1997 – Özge Yağız, Turkish actress
- 1997 – Isaiah Rivera, Puerto Rican dunker
- 2000 – Frankie Amaya, American soccer player
- 2000 – Princess Salma bint Abdullah, Jordanian princess
- 2001 – João Pedro, Brazilian footballer
- 2001 – Xinyu Wang, Chinese tennis player
- 2003 – Jane Remover, American musician
- 2006 – Myles Lewis-Skelly, English footballer

== Deaths ==
=== Pre-1600 ===
- 800 – Berowulf, bishop of Würzburg
- 862 – Musa ibn Musa al-Qasawi, Muslim military leader (born c. 790)
- 1241 – Fujiwara no Teika, Japanese poet
- 1290 – Margaret, Maid of Norway Queen of Scotland (born 1283)
- 1313 – Gottfried von Hagenau, Alsatian theologian, medical doctor, and poet
- 1327 – Cecco d'Ascoli, Italian encyclopaedist, physician and poet (born 1257)
- 1328 – Ibn Taymiya, Islamic scholar and philosopher of Harran (born 1263)
- 1345 – William II, Count of Hainaut
- 1371 – Jovan Uglješa, Serbian despot
- 1413 – Stephen III, Duke of Bavaria (born 1337)
- 1417 – Francesco Zabarella, Italian cardinal (born 1360)
- 1468 – Juan de Torquemada, Spanish cardinal and theologian (born 1388)
- 1536 – Didier de Saint-Jaille, 46th Grandmaster of the Knights Hospitaller
- 1588 – Amias Paulet, Governor of Jersey (born 1532)
- 1600 – Claude Le Jeune, French composer (born 1530)

=== 1601–1900 ===
- 1620 – Taichang Emperor of China (born 1582)
- 1623 – Charles Grey, 7th Earl of Kent, English politician, Lord Lieutenant of Bedfordshire (born 1540)
- 1626 – Wakisaka Yasuharu, Japanese daimyō (born 1554)
- 1716 – Antoine Parent, French mathematician and theorist (born 1666)
- 1764 – Benito Jerónimo Feijóo y Montenegro, Spanish monk and scholar (born 1676)
- 1800 – William Billings, American composer and educator (born 1746)
- 1802 – Jurij Vega, Slovene mathematician and physicist (born 1754)
- 1820 – Daniel Boone, American hunter and explorer (born 1734)
- 1825 – José Bernardo de Tagle y Portocarrero, Marquis of Torre Tagle, Peruvian soldier and politician, 2nd President of Peru (born 1779)
- 1830 – Teresa Casati, Italian noblewomen and revolutionary (born 1787)
- 1846 – Thomas Clarkson, English abolitionist (born 1760)
- 1847 – John Oliver Curran, Irish physician (born 1819)
- 1868 – August Ferdinand Möbius, German mathematician and astronomer (born 1790)
- 1877 – Hermann Grassmann, German mathematician and physicist (born 1809)

=== 1901–present ===
- 1902 – Levi Strauss, German-American businessman, founded Levi Strauss & Co. (born 1829)
- 1904 – Lafcadio Hearn, Greek-Japanese author and academic (born 1850)
- 1904 – John Fitzwilliam Stairs, Canadian businessman and politician (born 1848)
- 1922 – Charles Wade, Australian politician, 17th Premier of New South Wales (born 1863)
- 1935 – Andy Adams, American author (born 1859)
- 1935 – Iván Persa, Slovene-Hungarian priest and author (born 1861)
- 1937 – Bessie Smith, American singer and actress (born 1894)
- 1943 – Henri Fertet, French Resistance fighter (born 1926)
- 1945 – Béla Bartók, Hungarian pianist and composer (born 1881)
- 1946 – William Strunk Jr., American author and educator (born 1869)
- 1947 – Hugh Lofting, English-American author and poet (born 1886)
- 1951 – Hans Cloos, German geologist and academic (born 1885)
- 1952 – George Santayana, Spanish philosopher, novelist, and poet (born 1863)
- 1953 – Xu Beihong, Chinese painter and educator (born 1895)
- 1954 – Ellen Roosevelt, American tennis player (born 1868)
- 1957 – Arthur Powell Davies, American minister and author (born 1902)
- 1959 – S. W. R. D. Bandaranaike, Sri Lankan lawyer and politician, 4th Prime Minister of Sri Lanka (born 1899)
- 1959 – Leslie Morshead, Australian general (born 1889)
- 1959 – Teodor Ussisoo, Estonian furniture designer and educator (born 1878)
- 1961 – Charles Erwin Wilson, American politician, 5th United States Secretary of Defense (born 1890)
- 1965 – James Fitzmaurice, Irish soldier and pilot (born 1898)
- 1968 – Ben Shlomo Lipman-Heilprin, Polish-Israeli neurologist and physician (born 1902)
- 1968 – Daniel Johnson Sr., Canadian lawyer and politician, 20th Premier of Quebec (born 1915)
- 1968 – Władysław Kędra, Polish pianist (born 1918)
- 1972 – Charles Correll, American actor and screenwriter (born 1890)
- 1973 – Samuel Flagg Bemis, American historian and author (born 1891)
- 1973 – Ralph Earnhardt, American race car driver (born 1928)
- 1973 – Anna Magnani, Italian actress and singer (born 1908)
- 1976 – Leopold Ružička, Croatian-Swiss chemist and academic, Nobel Prize laureate (born 1887)
- 1977 – Uday Shankar, Indian dancer and choreographer (born 1900)
- 1978 – Manne Siegbahn, Swedish physicist and academic, Nobel Prize laureate (born 1886)
- 1979 – Arthur Hunnicutt, American actor (born 1910)
- 1982 – Alec Hurwood, Australian cricketer (born 1902)
- 1984 – Paquirri, Spanish bullfighter (born 1948)
- 1984 – John Facenda, American sportscaster (born 1913)
- 1987 – Ramang, Indonesian footballer and manager (born 1928)
- 1987 – Herbert Tichy, Austrian geologist, journalist, and mountaineer (born 1912)
- 1988 – Branko Zebec, Croatian and Yugoslav football player and coach (born 1929)
- 1989 – Hemanta Kumar Mukhopadhyay, Indian singer-songwriter and producer (born 1920)
- 1990 – Hiram Abas, Turkish intelligence officer (born 1932)
- 1990 – Alberto Moravia, Italian author and critic (born 1907)
- 1991 – Billy Vaughn, American singer and bandleader (born 1919)
- 1995 – Kalju Pitksaar, Estonian chess player (born 1931)
- 1996 – Nicu Ceaușescu, Romanian politician (born 1951)
- 1997 – Dorothy Kingsley, American screenwriter and producer (born 1909)
- 1998 – Betty Carter, American singer (born 1930)
- 1999 – Oseola McCarty, American philanthropist (born 1908)
- 2000 – Richard Mulligan, American actor (born 1932)
- 2000 – Baden Powell de Aquino, Brazilian guitarist and composer (born 1937)
- 2002 – Nils Bohlin, Swedish engineer, invented three-point safety belt (born 1920)
- 2003 – Shawn Lane, American guitarist, songwriter, and producer (born 1963)
- 2003 – Robert Palmer, English singer-songwriter (born 1949)
- 2004 – Marianna Komlos, Canadian bodybuilder, model, and wrestler (born 1969)
- 2005 – Helen Cresswell, English author and screenwriter (born 1934)
- 2006 – Byron Nelson, American golfer and coach (born 1912)
- 2006 – Iva Toguri D'Aquino, American wartime propaganda broadcaster (born 1916)
- 2007 – Bill Wirtz, American businessman (born 1929)
- 2008 – Marc Moulin, Belgian keyboard player, producer, and journalist (born 1942)
- 2008 – Paul Newman, American actor, director, producer, and businessman (born 1925)
- 2010 – Terry Newton, English rugby player (born 1978)
- 2010 – Gloria Stuart, American actress (born 1910)
- 2011 – Bob Cassilly, American sculptor, founded the City Museum (born 1949)
- 2012 – M'el Dowd, American actress and singer (born 1933)
- 2012 – Sylvia Fedoruk, Canadian physicist and politician, 17th Lieutenant Governor of Saskatchewan (born 1927)
- 2012 – Eugene Genovese, American historian and author (born 1930)
- 2012 – Sam Steiger, American journalist and politician (born 1929)
- 2013 – Azizan Abdul Razak, Malaysian politician, 10th Menteri Besar of Kedah (born 1944)
- 2013 – Seánie Duggan, Irish hurler (born 1922)
- 2013 – Mario Montez, Puerto Rican-American actor (born 1935)
- 2013 – Sos Sargsyan, Armenian actor and director (born 1929)
- 2014 – Jim Boeke, American football player and coach (born 1938)
- 2014 – Sam Hall, American screenwriter (born 1921)
- 2014 – Gerald Neugebauer, American astronomer and physicist (born 1932)
- 2014 – Tamir Sapir, Georgian-American businessman (born 1946)
- 2015 – Eudóxia Maria Froehlich, Brazilian zoologist (born 1928)
- 2015 – Sidney Phillips, American soldier, physician, and author (born 1924)
- 2015 – Ana Seneviratne, Sri Lankan police officer and diplomat (born 1927)
- 2016 – Toughie, last known Rabbs' fringe-limbed treefrog (h. fl. 2005)
- 2019 – Jacques Chirac, French politician, President of France (born 1932)
- 2024 – John Ashton, American actor (born 1948)

== Holidays and observances ==
- Christian feast days:
  - Canadian Martyrs (Catholic Church in Canada)
  - Cosmas and Damian
  - Blessed Crescencia Valls Espí
  - John of Meda
  - Blessed Kaspar Stanggassinger
  - Blessed Luigi Tezza
  - Nilus the Younger
  - Thérèse Couderc
  - Wilson Carlile (Anglican)
  - September 26 (Eastern Orthodox liturgics)
- Day of the National Flag (Ecuador)
- Dominion Day (New Zealand)
- European Day of Languages (European Union)
- International Day for the Total Elimination of Nuclear Weapons
- Petrov day
- Revolution Day (Yemen)
