= 1877 =

1877 in various calendars
- Gregorian calendar: 1877; MDCCCLXXVII
- Ab urbe condita: 2630
- Armenian calendar: 1326; ԹՎ ՌՅԻԶ
- Assyrian calendar: 6627
- Baháʼí calendar: 33–34
- Balinese saka calendar: 1798–1799
- Bengali calendar: 1283–1284
- Berber calendar: 2827
- British Regnal year: 40 Vict. 1 – 41 Vict. 1
- Buddhist calendar: 2421
- Burmese calendar: 1239
- Byzantine calendar: 7385–7386
- Chinese calendar: 丙子年 (Fire Rat); 4574 or 4367 — to — 丁丑年 (Fire Ox); 4575 or 4368
- Coptic calendar: 1593–1594
- Discordian calendar: 3043
- Ethiopian calendar: 1869–1870
- Hebrew calendar: 5637–5638
- Hindu calendars
- Vikram Samvat: 1933–1934
- Shaka Samvat: 1798–1799
- Kali Yuga: 4977–4978
- Holocene calendar: 11877
- Igbo calendar: 877–878
- Iranian calendar: 1255–1256
- Islamic calendar: 1293–1294
- Japanese calendar: Meiji 10 (明治１０年)
- Javanese calendar: 1805–1806
- Julian calendar: Gregorian minus 12 days
- Korean calendar: 4210
- Minguo calendar: 35 before ROC 民前35年
- Nanakshahi calendar: 409
- Thai solar calendar: 2419–2420
- Tibetan calendar: མེ་ཕོ་བྱི་བ་ལོ་ (male Fire-Rat); 2003 or 1622 or 850 — to — མེ་མོ་གླང་ལོ་ (female Fire-Ox); 2004 or 1623 or 851

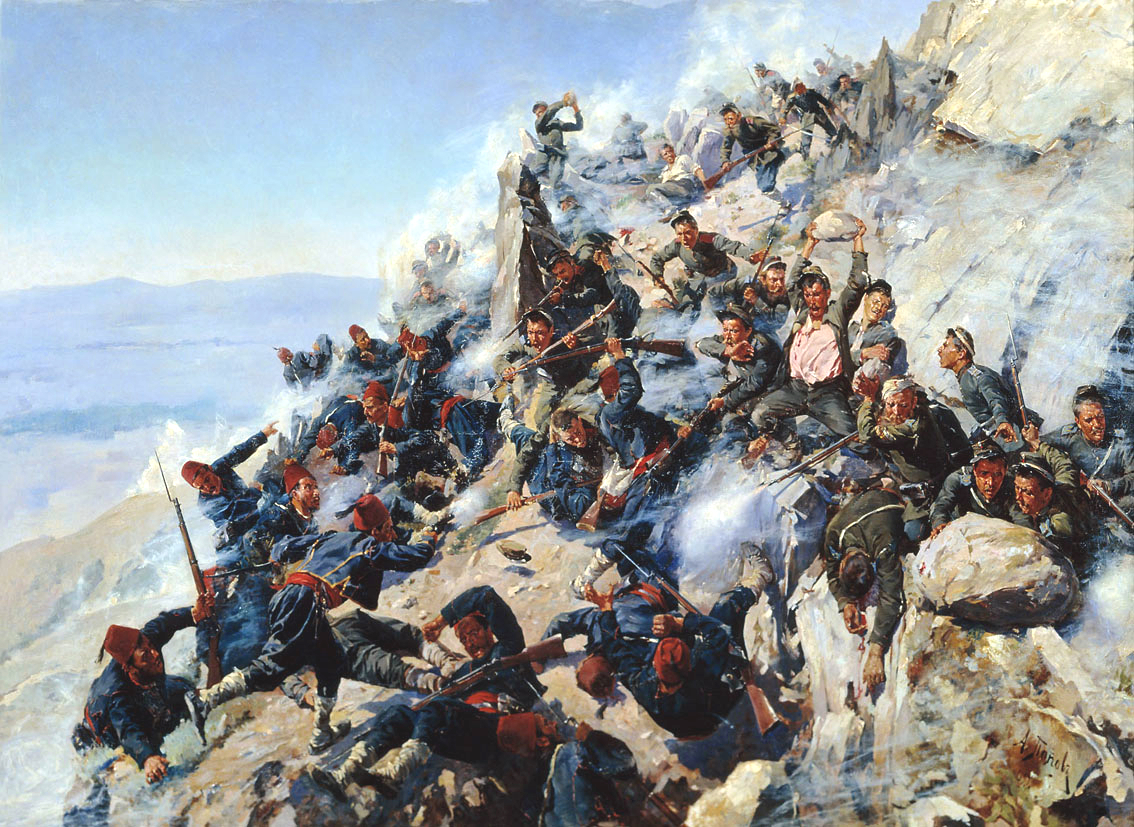
April 24: Start of the Russo-Turkish War (1877–1878)

1877 (MDCCCLXXVII) was a common year starting on Monday of the Gregorian calendar and a common year starting on Saturday of the Julian calendar, the 1877th year of the Common Era (CE) and Anno Domini (AD) designations, the 877th year of the 2nd millennium, the 77th year of the 19th century, and the 8th year of the 1870s decade. As of the start of 1877, the Gregorian calendar was 12 days ahead of the Julian calendar, which remained in localized use until 1923.

== Events ==
=== January ===
- January 1 – Queen Victoria is proclaimed Empress of India by the Royal Titles Act 1876, introduced by Benjamin Disraeli, the prime minister of the United Kingdom .
- January 8 – Great Sioux War of 1876: Battle of Wolf Mountain – Crazy Horse and his warriors fight their last battle with the United States Cavalry in Montana.
- January 20 – The Constantinople Conference ends, with Ottoman Turkey rejecting proposals of internal reform and Balkan provisions.
- January 29 – The Satsuma Rebellion, a revolt of disaffected samurai in Japan, breaks out against the new imperial government; it lasts until September, when it is crushed by a professionally led army of draftees.

=== February ===
- February 17 – Major General Charles George Gordon of the British Army is appointed Governor-General of the Sudan.

=== March ===
- March 2 – Compromise of 1877: The 1876 United States presidential election is resolved with the selection of Rutherford B. Hayes as the winner, even though Samuel J. Tilden won the popular vote on November 7, 1876.
- March 4
  - Emile Berliner patents the microphone in the United States.
  - Pyotr Ilyich Tchaikovsky's ballet Swan Lake debuts in Moscow.
- March 15 – English cricket team in Australia and New Zealand in 1876–77: The first Test cricket match is held between England and Australia.
- March 24 – For the only time in history, The Boat Race between the Universities of Oxford and Cambridge is declared a "dead heat" (i.e., a draw).
- March – The Nineteenth Century magazine is founded in London.

=== April ===
- April 10 – The first human cannonball act in the British Isles, and perhaps the world, is performed by 17-year-old Rossa Matilda Richter ("Zazel") at the London Royal Aquarium.
- April 12
  - The United Kingdom annexes the South African Republic, violating the Sand River Convention of 1852, causing the First Boer War.
  - The University of Tokyo is officially established in Japan.
- April 24
  - Russo-Turkish War (1877–1878): Russia declares war on the Ottoman Empire.
  - The Compromise of 1877 forces federal troops to withdraw from the Southern United States. This is the latest date disputed by historians when the Reconstruction Era ended and when the Gilded Age started.

=== May ===
- May 5 – Great Sioux War of 1876: Sitting Bull leads his band of Lakota into Canada, to avoid harassment by the U.S. Army under Colonel Nelson Miles.
- May 6 – Chief Crazy Horse of the Oglala Sioux surrenders to U.S. troops in Nebraska.
- May 8–11 – At Gilmore's Gardens in New York City, the first Westminster Kennel Club Dog Show is held.
- May 9 – Iquique Earthquake and tsunami: An earthquake of at least magnitude 8.5 M_{s} occurs on the west coast of South America, killing 2,541 around the Pacific Rim.
- May 16 – 16 May 1877 crisis in France: Parliament passes a no-confidence motion against the government appointed by President MacMahon.
- May 21 (May 9 O.S.) – By a speech in the Parliament of Romania by Mihail Kogălniceanu, the country declares itself independent from the Ottoman Empire (recognized in 1878 after the end of the Romanian independence war).
- May 30 – Yakub Beg of Yettishar dies having been poisoned in Korla.

=== June ===
- June 15 – Henry Ossian Flipper becomes the first African American cadet to graduate from the U.S. Military Academy.
- June 17 – American Indian Wars: Battle of White Bird Canyon – The Nez Perce defeat the U.S. Cavalry at White Bird Canyon, in the Idaho Territory. This begins the Nez Perce War.
- June 20 – Alexander Graham Bell installs the world's first commercial telephone service in Hamilton, Ontario, Canada.
- June 21 – The Molly Maguires are hanged at Carbon County Prison, in Mauch Chunk, Pennsylvania.
- June 26 – The eruption of the volcano Cotopaxi in Ecuador causes severe mudflows that wipe out surrounding cities and valleys, killing 1,000.
- June 30 – The British Mediterranean fleet is sent to Besika Bay.

=== July ===
- July 1 – An F4 tornado touches down near Gap, Pennsylvania, and moves towards Chester County. A woman is killed near Ercildoun; a man is killed near Parkesburg; and possibly a third person dies. 4 homes are destroyed at Parkesburg and 20 buildings are destroyed at Ercildoun. 10 or more homes are leveled in Chester County.
- July 9–19 – The All England Lawn Tennis and Croquet Club stages the first Wimbledon Championships in lawn tennis. English cricketer Spencer Gore becomes first Wimbledon gentlemen's singles champion (the only event held).
- July 16 – Great Railroad Strike of 1877: Riots by Baltimore and Ohio Railroad railroad workers in Baltimore lead to a sympathy strike and rioting in Pittsburgh, and a full-scale worker's rebellion in St. Louis, briefly establishing a communist government, before U.S. president Rutherford B. Hayes calls in the armed forces.
- July 19 – Russo-Turkish War: The first battle in the siege of Plevna is fought.
- July 30
  - Russo-Turkish War: The second battle in the siege of Plevna is fought.
  - Russo-Turkish War: The Turkish army and its allies destroy the Bulgarian city of Stara Zagora and massacre the inhabitants.
- July – The serial publication of Leo Tolstoy's Anna Karenina is concluded, in The Russian Messenger.

=== August ===
- August 9 – American Indian Wars: Battle of the Big Hole – Near Big Hole River, Montana, a small band of Nez Perce people who refuse government orders to move to a reservation, clash with the United States Army. The army loses 29 soldiers, and the Indians lose 89 warriors, in an Army victory.
- August 12 – American astronomer Asaph Hall discovers Deimos, the outer moon of Mars.
- August 18 – Asaph Hall discovers Phobos, the inner moon of Mars.

=== September ===
- September 1 – The Battle of Lovcha, third battle in the siege of Plevna, is fought. Russian forces successfully reduce the Ottoman fortress at Lovcha.
- September 5 – American Indian Wars: Oglala Sioux chief Crazy Horse is bayoneted by a United States soldier, after resisting confinement in a guardhouse at Fort Robinson in Nebraska.
- September 22 – Treaty 7 is concluded between several mainly Blackfoot First Nations tribes and the Canadian Confederation, at the Blackfoot Crossing of the Bow River, settling the Blackfoot on Indian reserves in what will become southern Alberta.
- September 24 – Battle of Shiroyama in Kagoshima, Japan: The Imperial Japanese Army annihilates heavily outnumbered rebel samurai under Saigō Takamori (who is killed), ending the Satsuma Rebellion.

=== October ===
- October 22 – The Blantyre mining disaster in Scotland kills 207 miners.

=== November ===
- November 14 – Henrik Ibsen's first contemporary realist drama The Pillars of Society is premièred at the Odense Teater.
- November 21 – Thomas Edison announces his invention of the phonograph, a machine that can record sound, considered his first great invention. Edison demonstrates the device for the first time on November 29.
- November 22 – The first college lacrosse game is played between New York University and Manhattan University.

=== December ===
- December 9 – The fourth battle of the Russo-Turkish War is fought, concluding the siege of Plevna.
- December 13 – Serbia restates its previous declaration of war against Turkey.
- December 16 – The premiere of Bruckner's Symphony No. 3 is given by the Vienna Philharmonic. Many of the audience walk out.
- December 30 – The premiere of Brahms' Symphony No. 2 is given by the Vienna Philharmonic under the baton of Hans Richter.

== Births ==
=== January–March ===
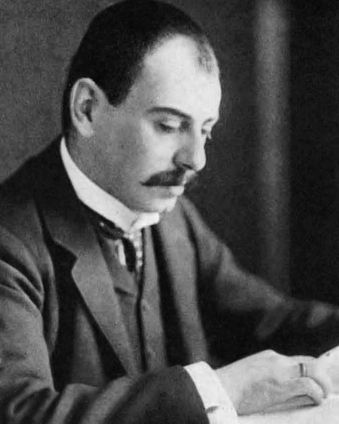
Edmund Landau

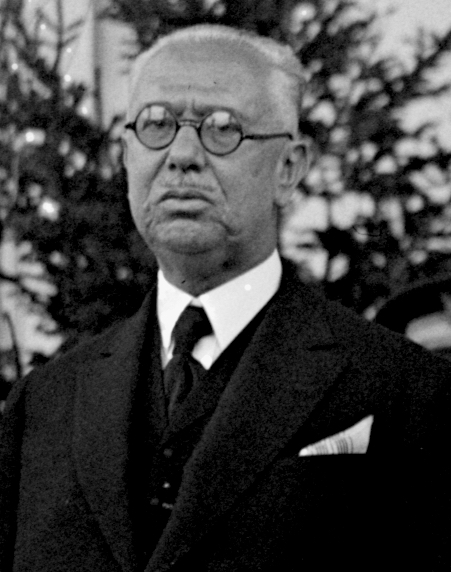
Pascual Ortiz Rubio

- January 2 – Slava Raškaj, Croatian painter (d. 1906)
- January 3 – Josephine Hull, American actress (d. 1957)
- January 22 – Hjalmar Schacht, German economist, politician and banker (d. 1970)
- January 26 – Kees van Dongen, Dutch-French painter (d. 1968)
- February 4 – Eddie Cochems, father of the forward pass in American football (d. 1953)
- February 7 – G. H. Hardy, British mathematician (d. 1947)
- February 8 – Carl Tanzler, German-born radiology technologist (d. 1952)
- February 12 – Louis Renault, French industrialist, founder of Renault automobile company (d. 1944)
- February 14 – Edmund Landau, German mathematician (d. 1938)
- February 17
  - Isabelle Eberhardt, Swiss explorer, writer (d. 1904)
  - André Maginot, French politician (d. 1932)
- February 19 – Gabriele Münter, German painter (d. 1962)
- February 25 – Erich von Hornbostel, Austrian musicologist (d. 1935)
- March 2 – Consuelo Vanderbilt, Duchess of Marlborough (d. 1964)
- March 4 – Garrett Morgan, American inventor (d. 1963)
- March 7 – Thorvald Ellegaard, Danish track cyclist (d. 1954)
- March 10 – Pascual Ortiz Rubio, Mexican politician, substitute President of Mexico, 1930–1932 (d. 1963)
- March 12 – Wilhelm Frick, German Nazi Minister of the Interior (d. 1946)
- March 17 – Ville Kiviniemi, Finnish politician (d. 1951)
- March 18 – Edgar Cayce, American psychic (d. 1945)

=== April–June ===
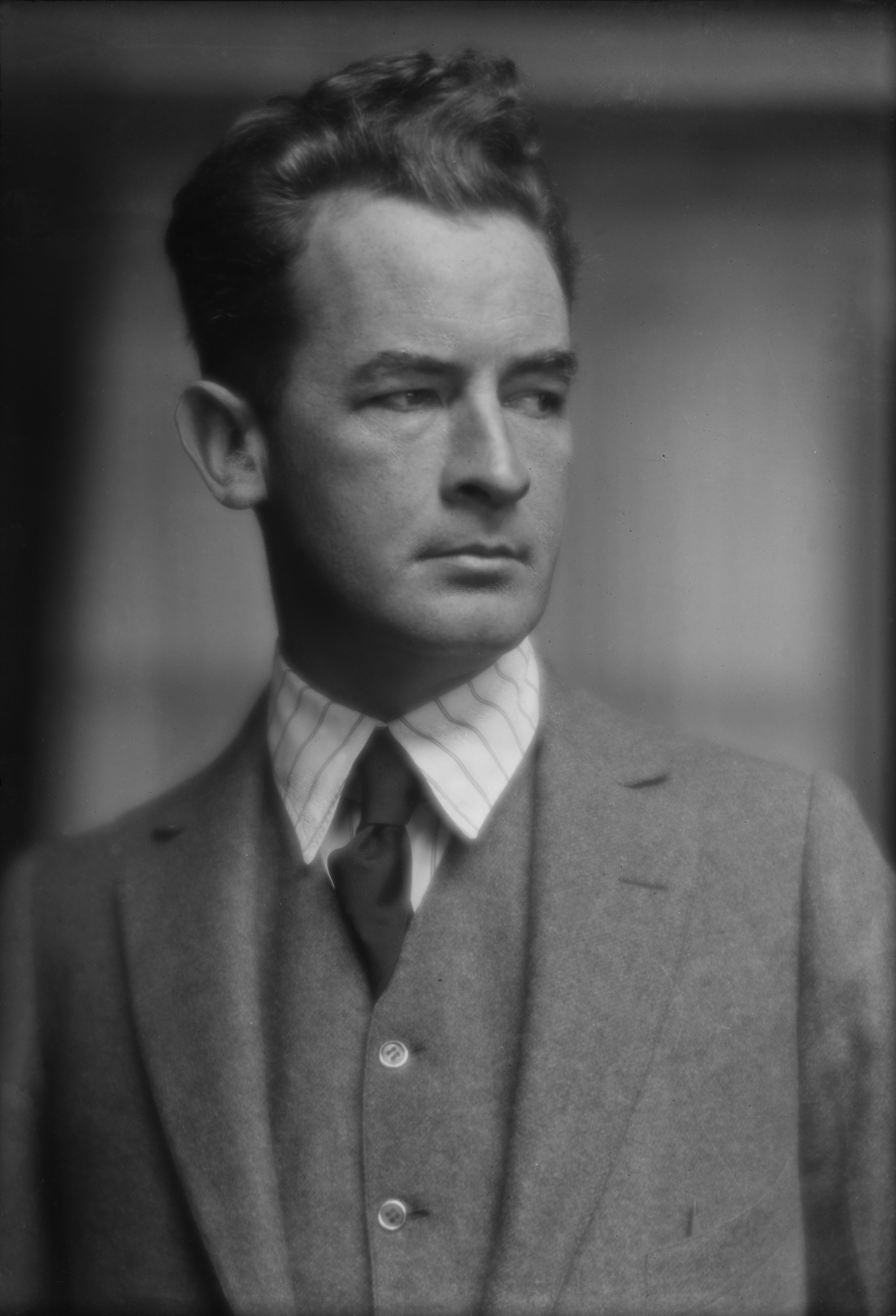
James Montgomery Flagg

- April 15 – Georg Kolbe, German sculptor (d. 1947)
- April 17 – Lionel Pape, English actor (d. 1944)
- April 26 – Alliott Verdon Roe, English aviation pioneer (d. 1958)
- April 30 – Alice B. Toklas, American writer (d. 1967)
- May 3 – Karl Abraham, German psychoanalyst (d. 1925)
- May 24 – Samuel W. Bryant, American admiral (d. 1938)
- May 25 – Billy Murray, American singer (d. 1954)
- May 27 – Isadora Duncan, American dancer (d. 1927)
- June 4 – Heinrich Otto Wieland, German chemist, Nobel Prize laureate (d. 1957)
- June 7 – Charles Glover Barkla, English physicist, Nobel Prize laureate (d. 1944)
- June 11 – Renée Vivien, British poet who wrote in French (d. 1909)
- June 12 – Thomas C. Hart, American admiral, politician (d. 1971)
- June 14 – Jane Bathori, French opera singer (d. 1970)
- June 18 – James Montgomery Flagg, American artist, comics artist and illustrator (d. 1960)
- June 19 – Charles Coburn, American actor (d. 1961)

=== July–September ===
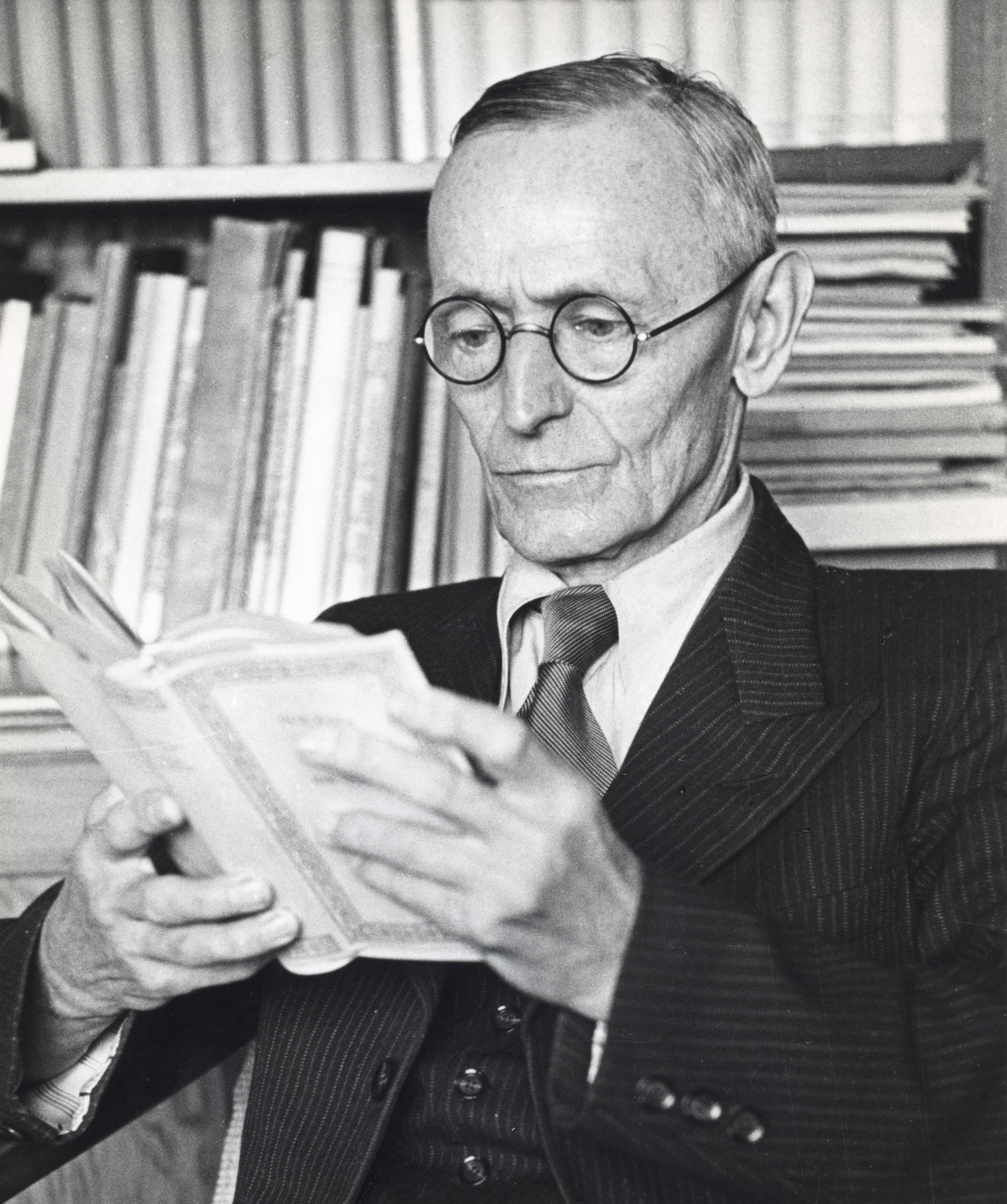
Hermann Hesse

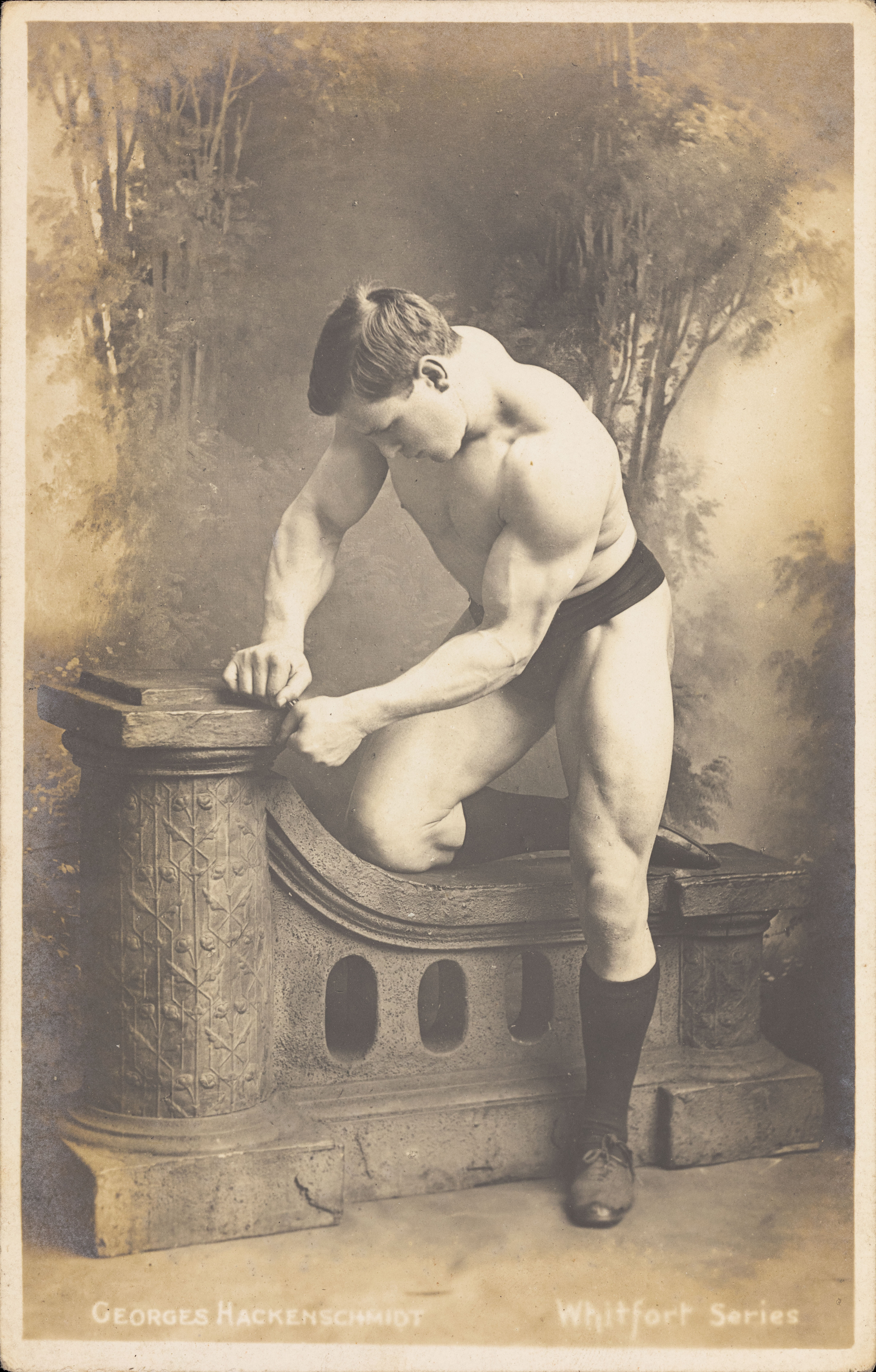
George Hackenschmidt

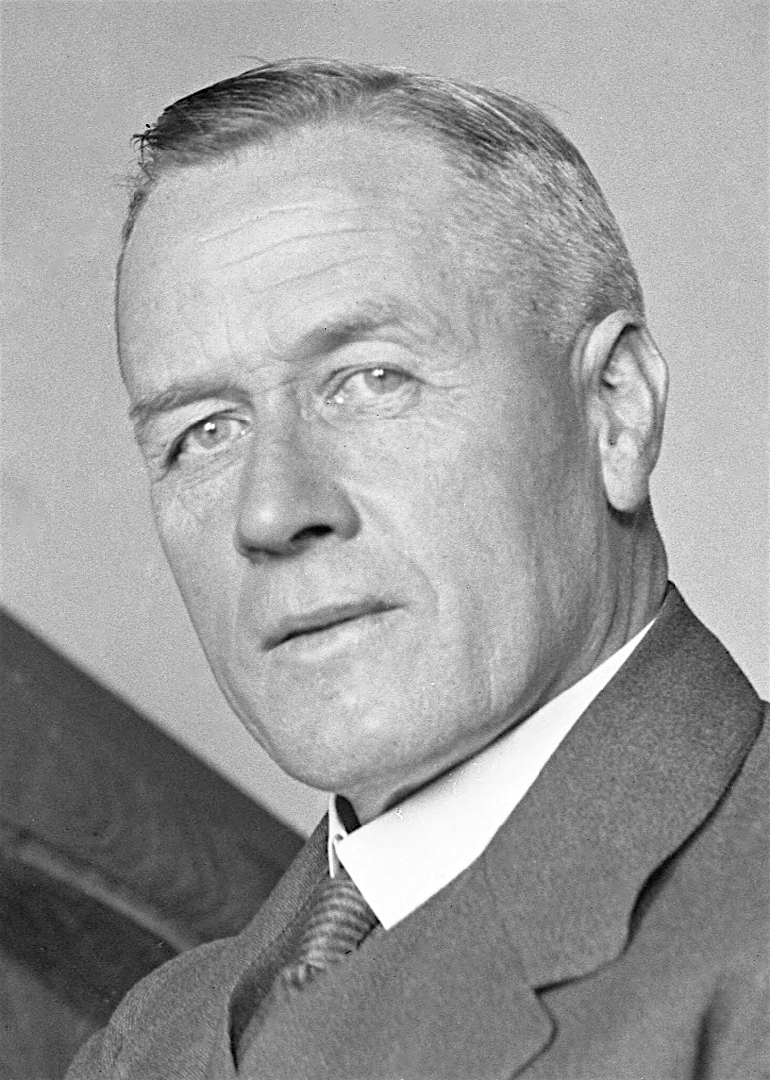
John Latham

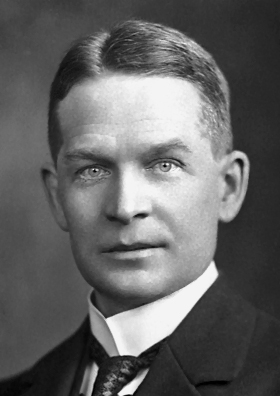
Frederick Soddy

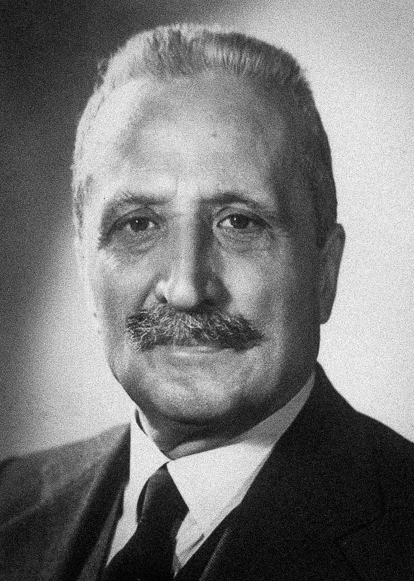
Enrico De Nicola

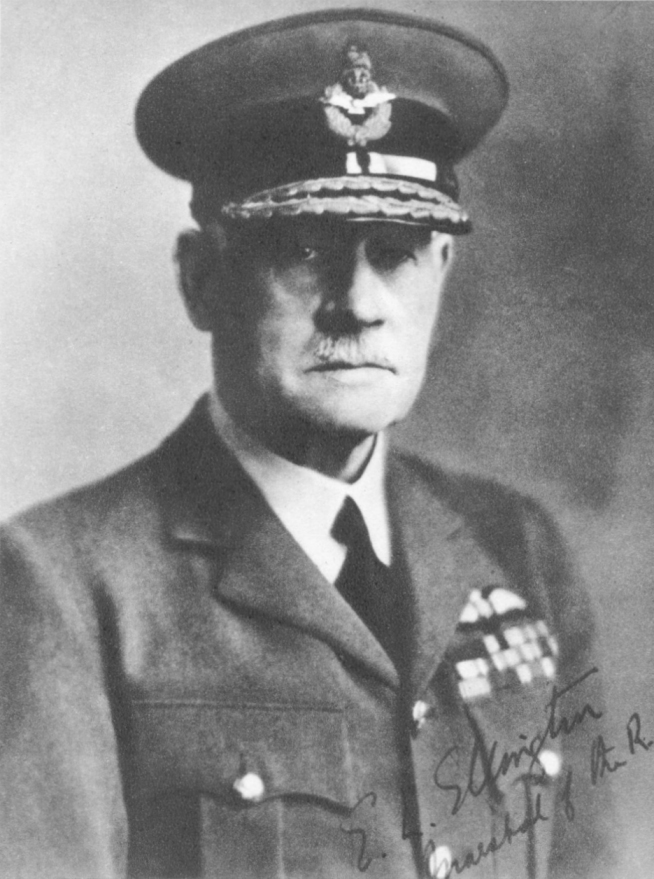
Edward Ellington

- July 2
  - Rinaldo Cuneo, American artist ("the painter of San Francisco") (d. 1939)
  - Hermann Hesse, German-born writer, Nobel Prize laureate (d. 1962)
- July 6 – Arnaud Massy, French golfer (d. 1950)
- July 13 – Erik Scavenius, Prime Minister of Denmark (d. 1962)
- July 19 – Arthur Fielder, English cricketer (d. 1949)
- July 27 – Ernst von Dohnányi, Hungarian conductor (d. 1960)
- July 31 – Louisa Bolus, South African botanist and taxonomist (d. 1970)
- August 1 – George Hackenschmidt, Estonian strongman, professional wrestler (d. 1968)
- August 6 – Wallace H. White, Jr., U.S. Senator from Maine (d. 1952)
- August 7 – Ulrich Salchow, Swedish figure skater (d. 1949)
- August 16 – Roque Ruaño, Spanish priest, civil engineer (d. 1935)
- August 22 – Ananda Coomaraswamy, Ceylonese Tamil philosopher (d. 1947)
- August 26 – John Latham, Australian politician, judge (d. 1964)
- August 27
  - Lloyd C. Douglas, American minister, author (d. 1951)
  - Charles Rolls, Welsh co-founder of the Rolls-Royce car firm, pioneer aviator (d. 1910)
- August 29 – Dudley Pound, British admiral (d. 1943)
- September 1
  - Francis William Aston, English chemist, Nobel Prize laureate (d. 1945)
  - Rex Beach, American novelist, playwright, and Olympic water polo player (d. 1949)
- September 2 – Frederick Soddy, English chemist, Nobel Prize laureate (d. 1956)
- September 6 – Buddy Bolden, American jazz musician (d. 1931)
- September 14 – Leonhard Seppala, Norwegian-American sled dog breeder, trainer and musher (d. 1967)
- September 16 – Thomas Alan Goldsborough, American politician, member of the US House of Representatives from 1921 to 1939 and a United States district judge from 1939 to 1951 (d. 1951)
- September 25 – Plutarco Elías Calles, Mexican general and President of Mexico, 1924–1928; known as Jefe Maximo ("Maximum Boss") from 1928 to 1934 (d. 1945)
- September 26
  - Alfred Cortot, Swiss pianist (d. 1962)
  - Edmund Gwenn, English actor (d. 1959)
  - Bertha De Vriese, Belgian physician (d. 1958)

=== October–December ===
- October 10 – William Morris, 1st Viscount Nuffield, British businessman, philanthropist (d. 1963)
- October 15 – Helen Ware, American stage, film actress (d. 1939)
- October 21 – Oswald Avery, Canadian-American physician, medical researcher (d. 1955)
- October 22 – Frederick Twort, English bacteriologist (d. 1950)
- October 29 – Narcisa de Leon, Filipino film producer (d. 1966)
- October 30 – Hugo Celmiņš, 2-time prime minister of Latvia (d. 1941)
- November 1 – Else Ury, German writer, children's book author (d. 1943)
- November 2 – Claire McDowell, American silent film actress (d. 1966)
- November 3 – Carlos Ibáñez del Campo, 2-time President of Chile (d. 1960)
- November 9
  - Enrico De Nicola, 1st President of Italy (d. 1959)
  - Muhammad Iqbal, Islamic philosopher and poet, one of the founding fathers of All-India Muslims League (d. 1938)
- November 15 – William Hope Hodgson, English author (d. 1918)
- November 17 – Frank Lahm, Brigadier General USAF, airship pilot, early military aviator trained by the Wright brothers (d. 1963)
- November 20 – Herbert Pitman, British mariner; 3rd Officer aboard RMS Titanic (d. 1961)
- November 22
  - Endre Ady, Hungarian poet (d. 1919)
  - Joan Gamper, Swiss-born businessman, founder of FC Barcelona (d. 1930)
- November 24 – Edward C. Kalbfus, American admiral (d. 1954)
- December 3 – Richard Pearse, New Zealand airplane pioneer (d. 1953)
- December 4 – Morris Alexander, South African politician (d. 1946)
- December 16 – Kichisaburō Nomura, Japanese admiral and diplomat (d. 1964)
- December 20 – Thomas Walter Swan, American jurist and judge on the United States Court of Appeals for the Second Circuit from 1926 until 1975 (d. 1975)
- December 30 – Edward Ellington, British military officer; Marshal of the Royal Air Force (d. 1967)

=== Date unknown ===
- F. X. Gouraud, French physician and dietitian (d. 1913)
- Rashid Talaa, Prime Minister of Jordan (d. 1926)

== Deaths ==
=== January–June ===
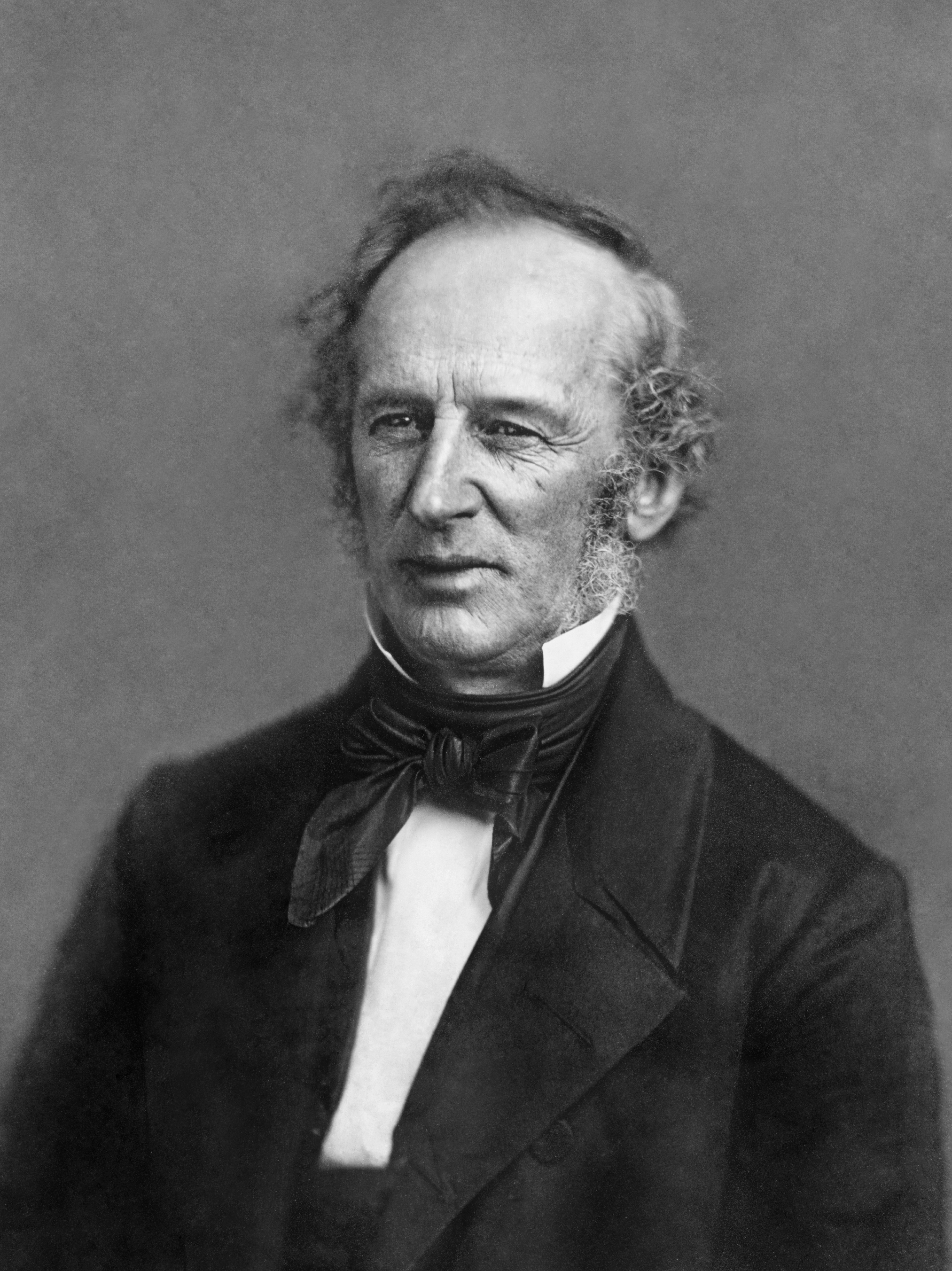
Cornelius Vanderbilt

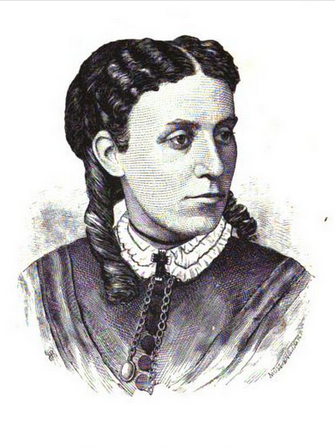
Henrietta A. Bingham

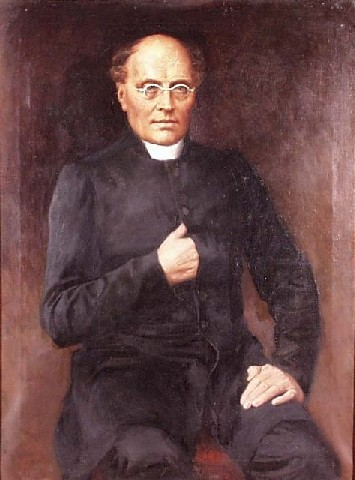
J. L. Runeberg

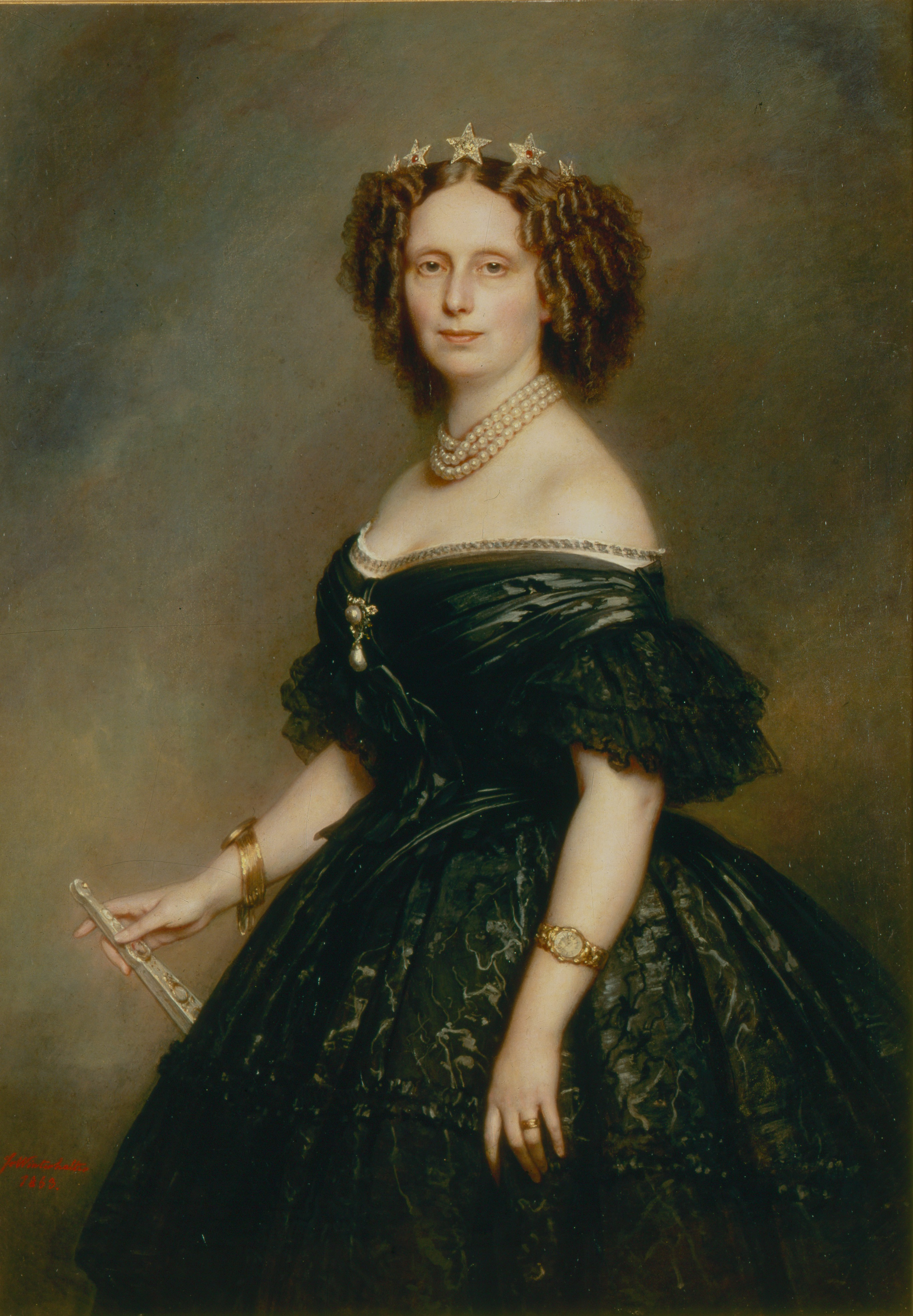
Sophie of Württemberg

- January 1 – Karl von Urban, Austrian field marshal (suicide) (b. 1802)
- January 2 – Alexander Bain, Scottish inventor (b. 1811)
- January 4 – Cornelius Vanderbilt, American entrepreneur (b. 1794)
- January 20 – Dato Maharajalela Lela, Malay nationalist
- February 15 – Rayko Zhinzifov, Bulgarian poet and translator (b. 1839)
- February 18 – Henrietta A. Bingham, American editor (b. 1841)
- February 20
  - Louis M. Goldsborough, United States Navy admiral (b. 1805)
  - Marie Simon, German nurse (b. 1824)
- February 25 – Jung Bahadur Rana, Nepalese ruler (b. 1817)
- March 1 – Antoni Patek, Polish watchmaker (b. 1811)
- March 24 – Walter Bagehot, British businessman, essayist and journalist (b. 1826)
- March 25 – Caroline Chisholm, Australian humanitarian (b. 1808)
- March 31 – Bully Hayes, American-born Caribbean blackbirder (killed) (b. 1827 or 1829)
- April 8 – Bernardino António Gomes, Portuguese physician and naturalist (b. 1806)
- April 14 – Konstantin Bernhard von Voigts-Rhetz, Prussian general (b. 1809)
- April 15 – J. P. C. Emmons, American attorney and politician (b. 1818)
- May 6 – J. L. Runeberg, Finnish national poet (b. 1804)
- May 19 – Charlotta Djurström, Swedish actress and theater manager (b. 1807)
- May 26 – Kido Takayoshi, Japanese statesman (b. 1833)
- June 3
  - Ludwig Ritter von Köchel, Austrian musicologist (b. 1800)
  - Sophie of Württemberg, queen consort of the Netherlands (b. 1818)
- June 17 – John Stevens Cabot Abbott, American historian, pastor and pedagogical writer (b. 1805)
- June 22 – John R. Goldsborough, U.S. Navy commodore (b. 1809)

=== July–December ===
- July 16 – Samuel McLean, American congressman (b. 1826)
- July 27 – John Frost, British Chartist leader (b. 1784)
- August 2 – Karl Friedrich von Steinmetz, Prussian field marshal Urdu (b. 1796)
- August 8 – William Lovett, British Chartist leader (b. 1800)
- August 17 – Isaac Aaron, English-born physician, owner of the Australian Medical Journal and secretary of the Australian Medical Association (b. 1804)
- August 29 – Brigham Young, American Mormon leader (b. 1801)
- August 30 – Raphael Semmes, American and Confederate naval officer (b. 1809)
- September 2 – Konstantinos Kanaris, Greek politician (b. 1795)
- September 3 – Adolphe Thiers, French historian, politician (b. 1797)
- September 5 – Crazy Horse, American Oglala Lakota chief (b. 1840-45)
- September 12 – Emily Pepys, English child diarist (b. 1833)
- September 13 – Alexandre Herculano, Portuguese writer and historian (b. 1810)
- September 17 – Henry Fox Talbot, English photographer (b. 1800)
- September 24 – Saigō Takamori, Japanese samurai (b. 1828)
- October 3 – James Roosevelt Bayley, first Roman Catholic Bishop of Newark, New Jersey, and eighth Archbishop of Baltimore (b. 1814)
- October 10 – Johann Georg Baiter, Swiss philologist, textual critic (b. 1801)
- October 16 – Théodore Barrière, French dramatist (b. 1823)
- October 28 – Julia Kavanagh, Irish novelist (b. 1824)
- October 29 – Nathan Bedford Forrest, American Confederate Civil War General, first Grand Wizard of the Ku Klux Klan (b. 1821)
- November 1 – Oliver P. Morton, American politician (b. 1823)
- November 2 – Friedrich Graf von Wrangel, Prussian field marshal (b. 1784)
- December 12 – José de Alencar, Brazilian novelist (b. 1829)
- December 17 – Louis d'Aurelle de Paladines, French general (b. 1804)
- December 29 – Angelica Singleton Van Buren, Acting First Lady of the United States (b. 1818)
- December 30 – William Cormick, physician in Qajar Iran of British origin (b. 1822)
- December 31 – Gustave Courbet, French painter (b. 1819)

=== Date unknown ===
- Nicolae Golescu, 9th Prime Minister of Romania (b. 1810)
