= Halper =

Halper is a variation of the Jewish surname Heilprin and may refer to:

- Albert Halper (1904–1984), writer
- Barry Halper (1939–2005), collector of baseball memorabilia
- Benzion Halper (1884–1924), Lithuanian-American Hebraist and Arabist
- Daniel Halper, author
- Donna Halper (born 1947), Boston-based historian and radio consultant
- Jeff Halper (born 1946), Israeli anthropologist
- Jürgen Halper (born 1974), Austrian football manager
- Katie Halper, American writer and comedian
- Leivick Halper (1888–1962), Yiddish language writer
- Mark Robert Halper (born 1965), photographer
- Stefan Halper (born 1944), American foreign policy scholar

== See also ==
- Santos L. Halper, misspelled version of Santa's Little Helper, fictional dog from The Simpsons in the episode "The Canine Mutiny"
