= Alpers =

Alpers is a surname and may refer to:

== Surname ==
- Agnes Alpers (born 1961), educator and politician
- Boris Alpers (1894-1974), Soviet theatre critic, historian, and educator
- David Hershel Alpers (born 1935), American gastroenterologist
- Friedrich Alpers (1901–1944), German politician
- Hans Joachim Alpers (1943–2011), German writer
- Jackie Alpers (born 1968), American photographer and author
- Michael Alpers (1934–2024), Australian medical researcher
- O. T. J. Alpers (1867–1927), New Zealand teacher, journalist, writer and poet
- Svetlana Alpers (born 1936), American art historian

== See also ==
- Alpers, Oklahoma, an unincorporated community in Oklahoma, United States
