= ItWasntEnough =

EP by XXXTentacion
- Released: March 18, 2016 (original release); September 8, 2023 (Columbia re-release)
- Recorded: 2016
- Genres: Emo rap; alternative hip hop; spoken word
- Length: 10:48
- Labels: Bad Vibes Forever; Columbia
- Producers: XXXTentacion; Killstation; Grimm Doza; Cudda; Ronny J; JakesAlive

XXXTentacion chronology
Members Only, Vol. 2 (2015)	ItWasntEnough (2016)	Willy Wonka Was a Child Murderer (2016)

ItWasntEnough is the eighth extended play by American rapper XXXTentacion. It was originally released on March 18, 2016, before being re-released posthumously for streaming services on September 8, 2023.

The EP focuses much on X's personal suicidality and regret. Two of the songs on the EP, "I Spoke to the Devil in Miami, He Said Everything Would Be Fine" and "Manikin" were described by XXL magazine as two of XXXTentacion's "best deep cuts". This EP is a shorter version of a much longer scrapped and unfinished mixtape named ItWillAllBeOverSoon.

== Track listing ==
Credits adapted from Tidal.

ItWasntEnough track listing
No.	Title	Writer(s)	Producer(s)	Length
1.	"Snow" (with Killstation)	Jahseh Onfroy; Nolan Santana; Atticus Ross; Trent Reznor	Killstation	1:48
2.	"Manikin" (with Wifisfuneral)	Onfroy; Isaiah Rivera; Christian Cardoza	Grimm Doza	3:01
3.	"I Luv My Clique Like Kanye West" (with Wifisfuneral)	Onfroy; Rivera; Shomari Powell	Cudda	3:00
4.	"I Spoke to the Devil in Miami, He Said Everything Would Be Fine"	Onfroy; Matthew Weyandt; JakesAlive; Ronald Spence Jr.	XXXTentacion; JakesAlive; Ronny J	2:58
Total length:				10:48

Notes

- "Manikin" is stylized in all caps.
- "I Luv My Clique Like Kanye West" is stylized in alternating caps.
- "I Spoke to the Devil in Miami, He Said Everything Would Be Fine" is stylized in sentence case.
- "I Spoke to the Devil in Miami, He Said Everything Would Be Fine" was originally named "ItWillAllBeOverSoon" as the name of the file on SoundCloud is "ItWillAllBeOverSoon (Rough).wav"
