= Senator Halperin =

Senator Halperin or Halpern may refer to:

- Donald Halperin (1945–2006), New York State Senate
- Seymour Halpern (1913–1997), New York State Senate
- Sonya Halpern (born 1967), Georgia State Senate

== See also ==
- Heilprin
