= Halpern =

Halpern is a variation of the Jewish surname Heilprin, see the latter article for other variants. Notable people with the surname include:

- Baruch Halpern, professor of Jewish studies
- Benjamin Halpern, American marine biologist and ecologist
- Carolyn Halpern, American psychologist
- Charles Halpern, lawyer
- Charna Halpern (born 1952), American comedian and co–founder of ImprovOlympic
- Cheryl Halpern, chair of the Corporation for Public Broadcasting
- David Halpern (canoeist), (b. 1955), sprint canoer
- Deborah Halpern (b. 1957), Australian sculptor
- Diane F. Halpern, American psychologist
- Ida Halpern (1910–1987), Austrian musicologist
- Iris Halpern, American politician
- Jack Halpern (chemist), (1925–2018), Polish chemist
- Jack Halpern (linguist) (born 1946), German-born lexicographer
- Jake Halpern (b. 1975), American author
- Jeff Halpern (b. 1976), American ice hockey player
- Joseph Halpern (1953–2026), Israeli-American computer science professor
- Justin Halpern (b. 1980), American author
- Leivick Halpern, best known under the pen name H. Leivick, American writer and Yiddish poet (1888–1962)
- Lily Halpern (born 1991), American singer
- Mitch Halpern (1967–2000), boxing referee
- Michael Halpern, American fashion designer
- Mortimer Halpern (1909–2006), American Broadway stage manager
- Moyshe Leyb Halpern (1886–1932), American Yiddish poet
- Paul Halpern (b. 1961), American science writer and physicist
- Paul G. Halpern (b. 1937), American naval historian
- Ralph Halpern (born 1938), Austrian-born British businessman
- Seymour Halpern (1913–1997), American politician from New York
- Sonya Halpern (born 1967), American politician from Georgia
- Steven Halpern, American new age musician
- Yisroel Halpern (aka Yisroel Karduner), (d. 1920), rabbi and Breslover Hasid

== See also ==
- Halpern v. Canada (Attorney General), a landmark Canadian legal case which legalized same–sex marriage
- Mr. Halpern and Mr. Johnson, a 1983 TV movie
