= Heilpern =

Heilpern is a variation of the Jewish surname Heilprin and may refer to:

- David Heilpern, Australian lawyer and author
- Herbert Heilpern, soccer (football) player
- John Heilpern (1942–2021), English author
