= Heilbron (surname) =

Heilbron is a variation of the Jewish surname Heilprin and may refer to:

- Brently Heilbron, (born 1976), American satirist
- Ian Heilbron (1886–1959), British chemist
- John L. Heilbron (1934–2023), American historian of science
- Lorna Heilbron (born 1948), Scottish actress
- Rose Heilbron (1914–2005), British barrister and judge
- Vivien Heilbron (born 1944), Scottish actress

== See also ==
- Heilbronn (disambiguation)
