= Alperin =

Alperin is a Jewish surname. Notable people with the surname include:

- J. L. Alperin (1937–2025), American mathematician, co-discoverer of the Alperin–Brauer–Gorenstein theorem
- Mikhail Alperin (1956–2018), Ukrainian jazz musician
- Steve Alperin, American television news producer
