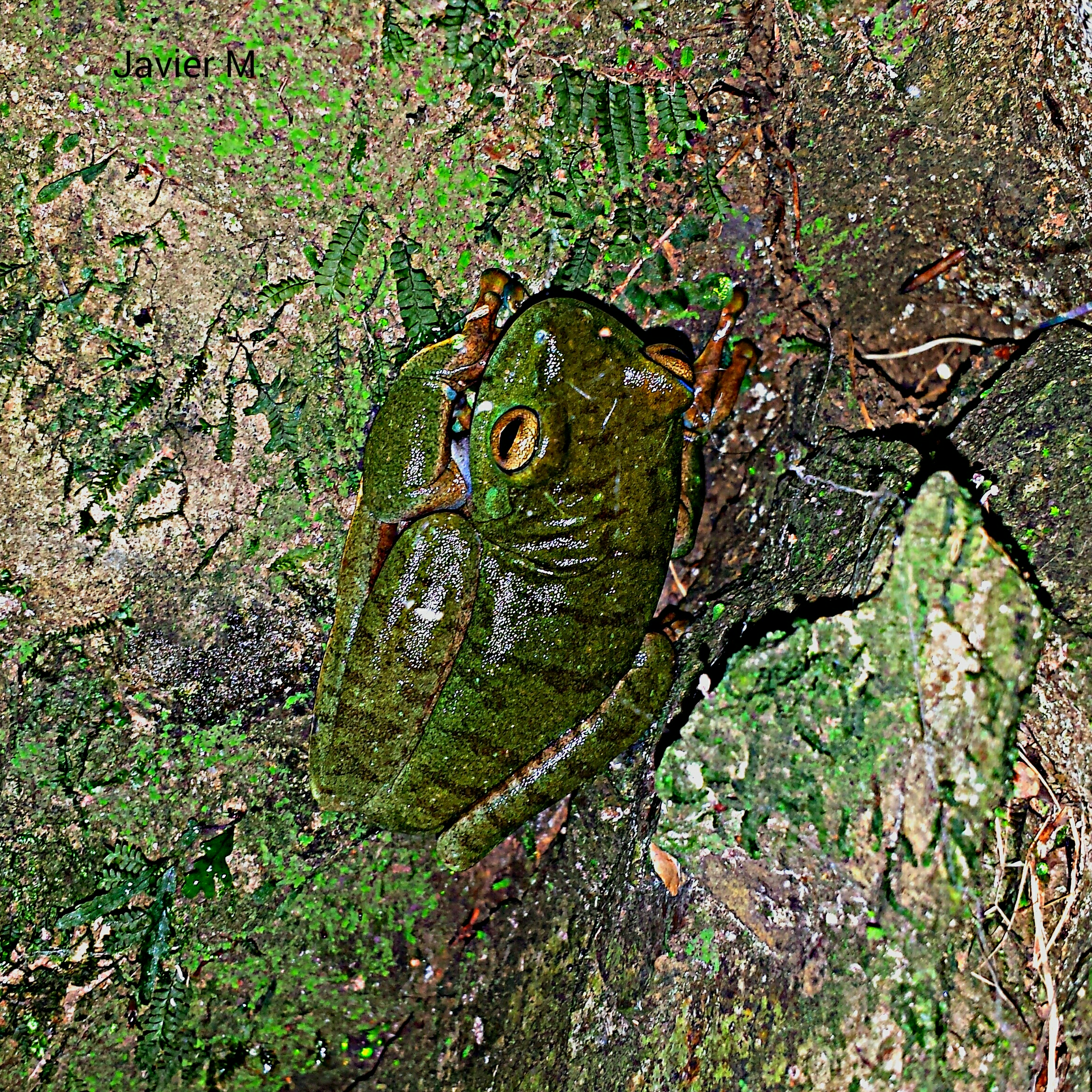

Conservation status
- Vulnerable (IUCN 3.1)

Scientific classification
- Kingdom: Animalia
- Phylum: Chordata
- Class: Amphibia
- Order: Anura
- Family: Hylidae
- Genus: Boana
- Species: B. heilprini

Binomial name
- Boana heilprini (Noble, 1923)

Synonyms
- Hyla heilprini Noble, 1923; Hypsiboas heilprini (Noble, 1923)

= Los Bracitos tree frog =

Species of amphibian

The Los Bracitos tree frog (Boana heilprini), or Hispaniolan green treefrog, is a species of frog in the family Hylidae endemic to Hispaniola and found below 1,856 m (6,089 ft) asl. The species was named in honour of professor Angelo Heilprin who funded the expedition that this species was discovered on.

Natural habitats of Boana heilprini are mountain streams associated with mesic broadleaf forests. It can also be found in various modified habitats, such as cacao and coffee plantations, pastures, crop agriculture areas, and areas with livestock or forestry activities. Nevertheless, it seems to require pockets of forest habitat to persist in a landscape. It is threatened by habitat loss associated with agricultural activities, logging and charcoaling, as well as mining and infrastructure development.
