= I Spoke to the Devil in Miami, He Said Everything Would Be Fine =

2016 song by XXXTentacion

Song by XXXTentacion

from the album Look at Me: The Album and ItWasntEnough
- Released: April 17, 2016 (SoundCloud) June 10, 2022 (Columbia re-release)
- Recorded: 2016
- Genre: Spoken word; conscious hip hop; poetry; horrorcore
- Length: 2:58
- Label: Bad Vibes Forever; Columbia
- Songwriters: Jahseh Onfroy; JakesAlive; Matthew Weyandt; Ronald Spence Jr.
- Producers: XXXTentacion; JakesAlive; Ronny J

"I Spoke to the Devil in Miami, He Said Everything Would Be Fine", originally titled "I Spoke to the Devil in Miami, He Told Me Everything Would Be Fine", is a song by American rapper and singer XXXTentacion. It was originally released independently on SoundCloud as a standalone track on April 17, 2016, before being included as a bonus track on his eighth extended play, ItWasntEnough. The song was later re-released commercially as the ninth track on the posthumous compilation album, Look at Me: The Album released on June 10, 2022, and subsequently appeared on the re-release version of ItWasntEnough, as the fourth track, issued on September 8, 2023, both through Columbia Records.

The track was produced by XXXTentacion, Ronny J, and JakesAlive, and samples "Ichor" by American electronic music producer Alasen. This song was described by XXL as one of X's "best deep cuts".

== Background ==
"I Spoke to the Devil in Miami, He Said Everything Would Be Fine" was among XXXTentacion's early releases on SoundCloud and became one of his most notable tracks prior to his mainstream breakthrough. On the track, XXXTentacion talked about selling his soul to Satan in exchange for success and explored themes of internal conflict between darkness and redemption; when questioned by DJ Akademiks on the subject, he refused to answer, concerned that he could encourage "kids going down that dark path". The track was originally named "ItWillAllBeOverSoon" as the name of the file on SoundCloud is "ItWillAllBeOverSoon (Rough).wav".

== Personnel ==
Credits adapted from Apple Music.

- Jahseh Onfroy – voice, songwriter, producer
- JakesAlive – songwriter, producer
- Matthew Weyandt – composer
- Ronald Spence Jr. – songwriter, producer

== Sources ==
- Reiss, Jonathan (2020), Look at Me! The XXXTentacion Story, Hachette, ISBN 978-0-306-84541-3
