= Louis Heilprin =

American historian (1851–1912)

- Born: 1851; Miskolc, Borsod County, Hungary, Austrian Empire
- Died: February 12, 1912 (aged 60)
- Occupations: Encyclopedist, Literary critic, columnist
- Known for: Publisher of American Encyclopedia

Louis Heilprin (July 2, 1851–1912) was a Hungarian American author, historian, and encyclopedia editor. He was born in Miskolc, Hungary in 1851. His father, Michael, son of Phineas Mendel, was also an encyclopedist and scholar of Hebrew history and literature and a follower of Lajos Kossuth. He had a younger brother Angelo who was a professor at the Philadelphia Academy of Sciences and two sisters. The family left Hungary as refugees in 1856. Heilprin was educated by his father.

Louis and his father were both contributors to the American Encyclopedia, Century Encyclopedia of Names, New International Encyclopedia, and Lippincott's Pronouncing Gazetteer. He also wrote articles for The Evening Post and The Nation.

== Books ==
- Heilprin, Louis (1898). The historical reference book: comprising a chronological table of universal history, a chronological dictionary of universal history, a biographical dictionary. D. Appleton and Company.
- Vambery, Arminius; Heilprin, Louis (1898). The Story of the Nations: Hungary. Putnam.
- Vambery, Arminius; Heilprin, Louis (1923). Hungary: in ancient, mediaeval, and modern times. T.F. Unwin.
