= Currambena School =

Location
- Australia; 33°49′15.80″S 151°10′13.01″E

Information
- Established: 1969
- Grades: P–6
- Enrolment: 93 (2006)
- Campus type: Suburban

Currambena School is an independent primary and preschool in Lane Cove, New South Wales.

== History ==
The school was established in 1969, when the then Woodley Preparatory School was purchased by the founders. It was one of a number of alternative schools that pioneered the application in Australia of the ideas of progressive educationalist A. S. Neill.

The school commenced with 116 students in January 1970: 72 in the preschool and 44 in the primary. The school expanded to include a second adjacent building in 1971. In 2003 the school had 71 students; in 2004 this had grown to 88 students in 2006 the school had 93 students. The Commonwealth government uses a measure of socio-economic status of independent schools to help determine their funding; Currambena has scored highly on this scale (meaning its students live in high socio-economic status locations).

As an alternative school, Currambena experienced external pressures from increasing standardisation of curricula, and from reforms to student assessment. Representatives of the school were prominent in criticising developments in education policy such as the introduction of national standardised tests.

== Organisation and activities ==
The school is administered by a council comprising six parents and three teachers; it has no school principal. The board is democratic and responsible for curriculum, facilities and employment decisions. The original articles of association stipulated a maximum class size of 25; this was subsequently reduced to 22, with classes split into three age groups.

The school emphasises creativity and flexibility in responding to the needs of individual children.

== Alumni ==
- David Heilpern, author and magistrate
