= Leon Mendelsburg =

Russian Jewish educator

- Born: May 19, 1819; Włodawa, Congress Poland
- Died: 1897 (aged 77–78); Warsaw, Warsaw Governorate, Congress Poland
- Writing career
- Language: German

Leon Mendelsburg (Yiddish: אריה ליב מענדעלסבורג, romanized: Aryeh Leib Mendelsburg; 22 May 1819 – 1897) was a Russian Jewish educator and writer.

== Biography ==
Leon Mendelsburg was born in 1819 in Włodawa, Russian Poland. At the age of twelve he went to study Talmud in Tomaszów under Phineas Mendel Heilprin. In 1850 he was appointed government teacher at the Jewish public school in Novograd-Volhynsk, and in 1854 he was transferred to the rabbinical school at Zhitomir, where he remained until the closing of that school by the government (July 1, 1873). He then settled in Koretz, and later in Warsaw.

From 1850 Mendelsburg was a frequent contributor in German to the Allgemeine Zeitung des Judentums, in which he published articles on the life of the Jews in the Russian Empire. He published also Dichtung und Warhheit (1862), a volume of sketches of Russo-Jewish life.

== Publications ==
- Dichtung und Wahrheit. Odessa: Druck von P. Franzow. 1862.
