= Michael Heilprin =

American biblical scholar (1823–1888)

- Born: 1823
- Died: 1888 (aged 64–65)
- Occupations: Scholar, critic, writer
- Children: Louis Heilprin; Angelo Heilprin
- Parent: Phineas Mendel Heilprin

Michael Heilprin (Hungarian: Heilprin Mihály, 1823 – 1888) was a Polish-American Jewish biblical scholar, critic, and writer, born at Piotrków, Russian Poland, to Jewish parents. His family was distinguished by its knowledge of Hebrew lore as far back as the 16th century. Michael Heilprin was a scholar who was familiar with more than a dozen languages.

== Early life ==
Michael Heilprin was born in 1823. His father, Phineas Mendel Heilprin, left Poland for Hungary in 1842. On the outbreak of the Hungarian revolution in 1848, Michael threw himself ardently into the movement led by Kossuth. The collapse of the revolution resulted in him leaving Europe in 1856 for the United States, where he remained for the rest of his life.

== Career ==
Heilprin was connected with the American Cyclopædia from 1858 and was one of the associate editors of the new edition of that publication (1873–1876). From the time of its establishment in 1865, he became a regular contributor to the New York Nation. In 1879–1880, he published two volumes of The Historical Poetry of the Ancient Hebrews, Translated and Critically Examined, a work of profound original research. The work was left incomplete at the author's death.

Heilprin directed the establishment of several successful agricultural colonies in the United States for Russian-Jewish immigrants.

=== Views on slavery ===
In the civil-war era, prominent Jewish religious leaders in the United States engaged in public debates about slavery. Generally, rabbis from the Southern states supported slavery, and those from the North opposed slavery.

Towards the end of the fifties when public opinion was crystallizing on the impending war issue, Philadelphia was the scene of a conflict whose bitterness can better be imagined than described. Party feeling had reached the boiling point when one evening Carpenter's Hall was appropriated for the use of the Anti-Slavery Democrats. The speaker on this occasion, all enthusiastic, was convincing his auditors of the justice of their cause when he was suddenly interrupted by the hoots and jeers of a crowd of hoodlums representing the "Copperheads,” who entirely unobserved had entered the meeting. Quick as a flash, in this moment of uproar, an unknown man rose from one of the front rows in the audience.Every eye was upon him. In breathless excitement he mounted his chair, and in the most vigorous German, reinforced by a remarkable eloquence, delivered such a bitter tirade against the methods of the opposition as to make him at once the object of the mob's resentment. He was immediately surrounded, severely assaulted, and was about to be rushed bodily out of the hall, when Dr. Edward Morwitz organized his friends upon the platform, made one grand united effort at rescue, and succeeded in tearing him away from the clutches of the angry mob. That man, that hero in the conflict for truth and justice, was Michael Heilprin.

The most notable debate was between rabbi Morris Jacob Raphall, who endorsed slavery, and rabbi David Einhorn who opposed it.

In 1861, Raphall published his views that slavery in a treatise called "The Bible View of Slavery". He wrote, "I am no friend to slavery in the abstract, and still less friendly to the practical working of slavery, But I stand here as a teacher in Israel; not to place before you my own feelings and opinions, but to propound to you the word of G-d, the Bible view of slavery." Heilprin, concerned that Raphall's position would be seen as the official policy of American Judaism, vigorously refuted his arguments, and argued that slavery—as practiced in the South—was immoral and not endorsed by Judaism.

== Personal life and death ==
Heilprin had two sons, Louis and Angelo Heilprin. He died in 1888.

== See also ==
- Heilprin
