= Ben Shlomo Lipman-Heilprin =

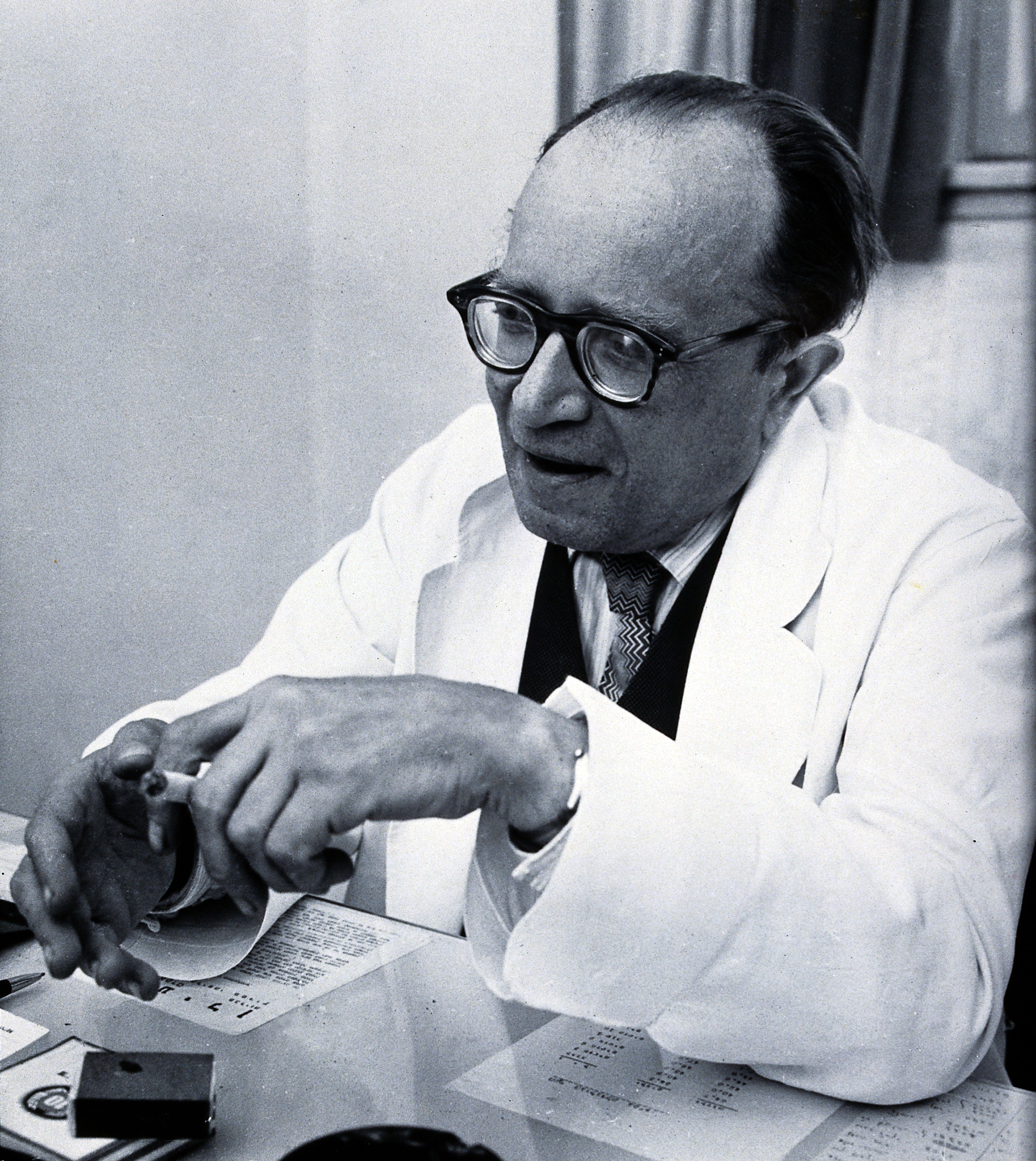
- Born: 10 December 1902; Białystok, Poland
- Died: 26 September 1968 (aged 65)
- Awards: Israel Prize
- Medical career
- Profession: physician
- Institutions: Hadassah Hospital
- Sub-specialties: neurology

Ben Shlomo Lipman-Heilprin (Hebrew: בן שלמה ליפמן-היילפרין; 10 December 1902 – 26 September 1968) was an Israeli physician and director of the Neurology Department of Hadassah Hospital in Jerusalem.

== Biography ==
Ben Shlomo Lipman-Heilprin was born in Białystok, Poland, in 1902. He studied medicine in Germany and immigrated to Mandate Palestine in 1934. In 1952, Heilprin composed the Hippocratic Oath in Hebrew.

== Awards ==
Heilprin was the first recipient of the Israel Prize for medicine, which was awarded to him in 1953, the inaugural year of the prize.

== See also ==
- List of Israel Prize recipients
- List of German Jews
- Heilprin
