= David Heilpern =

Australian lawyer and author

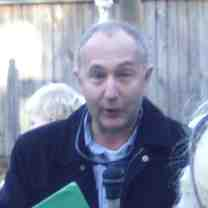
- Education: Bachelor of Legal Studies, Masters of Law by Research
- Alma mater: Macquarie University, Southern Cross University
- Occupation: Lawyer
- Employer: NSW Magistrates Court
- Known for: Magistrate

David Heilpern is an Australian lawyer and author. After attending school in Sydney, and university in Sydney, Canberra and Lismore, New South Wales, Heilpern became a solicitor and barrister. He is the author of For Fear of Favour: Sexual Assault of Young Prisoners, a prominent study of sexual assault in prisons, and has been an advocate of prison and law reform. In 1998 he became one of the youngest Magistrates in New South Wales. In 2004 he was awarded Southern Cross University's Alumnus of the Decade Award.

== Early life and education ==
Heilpern is the son of former Byron Shire Councillor, Sandra Heilpern. He initially attended Lane Cove Public School in Sydney, but his parents became concerned when the "school suggested that I needed to conform more, and told my parents that my rebellion was so regular that I needed to see a psychiatrist". He transferred to nearby independent democratic school Currambena in 1970. Recounting his memory of the alternative education he received there, he remarked:

Currambena was a revolution for me. I was asked questions about what I wanted to do each day. I learnt because I wanted to learn...The lessons of Currambena stayed with me as I did well at school, became a criminal lawyer, then the youngest head of a law school, then the youngest Magistrate in New South Wales...I can honestly attribute much of my success to my years at Currambena, for it gave me a love of learning that seems so rare these days, especially among boys.

Heilpern studied law in Sydney and Canberra, and undertook postgraduate study at Southern Cross University, completing a Masters of Law by Research in 1998. In 2004, he was the joint recipient of that university's Alumnus of the Decade Award.

== Career ==
Heilpern became a solicitor and barrister with the Australian Government Solicitor and in private practice, specialising in criminal law. Working on the New South Wales north coast, he was one of a group who prompted the establishment of a law degree at Southern Cross University, and he taught in the program, becoming the Deputy Head of School. In 1998, or early 1999, he became one of the youngest Magistrates in New South Wales.

As a young barrister, Heilpern rose to prominence following the publication of a study of sexual assault amongst young men in prisons. Heilpern interviewed 300 prisoners aged between 18 and 25, finding that around half reported experiencing assault in jail, with about a quarter being sexually assaulted. Australian High Court justice, Michael Kirby praised Heilpern's book, pointing out that while it made for unpleasant reading, it raised urgent issues of public policy. He also praised it for giving prisoners voice in their own words, saying that most of the statements recorded by Heilpern "have the ring of truth". The book received international notice, including in the US Congress, where it was "the only book included in submissions for what was to become a bipartisan, unanimous bill in both houses to reduce prison rape".

Much of Heilpern's work has been as an advocate for, and defender of, disadvantaged groups. In an article in the Alternative Law Journal, he wrote praising the work of single mothers in seeking to keep children, particularly young men, out of trouble with the law and criticising the lack of resources available to them. In 1999, Heilpern was Dubbo Local Court magistrate when a case of a young Indigenous man came before the court, charged with using offensive language to a police officer, having told two officers to "fuck off" when they sought to take into custody a bicycle he was riding. Heilpern threw out the police case, in a decision that had implications for the treatment of offensive language by the courts, as well as highlighting the extent to which the recommendations of the Royal Commission into Aboriginal Deaths in Custody were not being implemented in such examples. Of his own career and life, he has said he has been part of the prison reform, drug law reform and environment movements.

Ten years after conducting his study on prisoner sexual assault, he argued that conditions in prisons continued to deteriorate, and argued for the protection of prisoners' rights.

In 2006 he presided over the bail hearing of a high-profile assault case involving a charge of maliciously inflicting grievous bodily harm with intent. Heilpern is the author of over twenty journal articles and four books.

== Bibliography ==
- Fear or Favour: Sexual Assault of Young Prisoners (with foreword by Justice Michael Kirby). Southern Cross University Press, 1998.
- How do you plead: Representing yourself when charged with drink-driving in New South Wales local courts (with Helen Walsh). Walsh Publishing, 2003.
- Rough Deal: Your guide to drug laws (with Steven Bolt). Redfern Legal Centre Publishing, 1998 (2nd edition 2006).
