= Boris Alpers =

Boris Vladimrovich Alpers (Russian: Борис Владимирович Алперс; 1894–1974) was a Soviet theatre critic, historian, lecturer and professor at GITIS.

== Books ==
- Театр Революции. — М., 1928.
- Театр социальной маски. — М.-Л., 1931.
- М. С. Щепкин. — М., 1943.
- Актёрское искусство в России. Т. 1. — М.-Л., 1945.
- Путь советского театра. — М., 1947.
- Театральные очерки, two volumes, 1977 (posthumously)
- Искания новой сцены, 1985 (posthumously
