= Mark Robert Halper =

American photographer

- Born: 1965 (age 60–61); San Francisco, California U.S.
- Education: UCLA, Santa Fe Workshops
- Known for: Photography

Mark Robert Halper (1965, San Francisco, California) is a Los Angeles photographer noted for the striking human images in his commercial and fine art photography. He has worked in a wide range of specialties including portrait, lifestyle, celebrity, architecture, still life, and fine art.

== Commercial photography ==
Halper has worked with publications such as Barron's, BusinessWeek, Forbes, French Vogue, Black Enterprise, CIO, CFO, Entrepreneur, Golf, Health, Muscle and Fitness, PC World, Runner's World, SmartMoney, and The Wall Street Journal, among others.

Halper's celebrity subjects have included Nobel Prize winners, artists, and athletes, as well as businessmen Bill Gates and Sumner Redstone; actors Ben Stein, Tori Spelling, Randy Jackson, Mr. T, James Marsters, David Boreanaz, Jolene Blalock and Mark A. Sheppard; model Lauren Hutton, chef Wolfgang Puck, golfer John Daly, architect Frank Gehry, activist Erin Brockovich; and musicians Gene Simmons, Alejandro Lerner, Michelle Williams, Tears for Fears, and Michael Sadler.

Corporate clients have included AT&T, American Airlines, CBS, FedEx, Hasselblad, UCLA, MySpace, Xerox, Paramount Pictures, Samsung, Electronic Arts, Hitachi, Elan Pharmaceuticals, USC, Sony, Cedars-Sinai Medical Center, Sanyo-Fisher, and City of Hope National Medical Center.

== Teaching and speaking ==
Besides his own work, Halper has also taught photography at Santa Fe Workshops. He has studied with photographers such as Keith Carter, Andrew Eccles, Paul Elledge, Paul Aresu, Frank Ockenfels 3, Rodney Smith, Nick Merrick, Steve Hellerstein, Jay Maisel, Sean Kernan, and Dan Winters. He has also been an instructor for The Julia Dean Photo Workshops, the UCLA Extension, and has taught workshops through his own studio.

Halper has been a speaker for professional photography and design association events, including The Professional Photographers of Canada, The Professional Photographers of Orange County, and The Northwest Arkansas Art Directors Club. He has also been a frequent and popular guest on the Lightsource Podcasts at StudioLighting.net.

== Biography ==
Mark Robert Halper grew up in Los Angeles, where he still resides. He became interested in filmmaking in high school, an interest which would transform into still photography in college. Halper graduated from the University of Southern California in 1987 with a degree in international relations and political science. A year later he began studying commercial photography at UCLA Extension, and started shooting professional assignments in 1989. Halper moved to a downtown Los Angeles studio/loft in early 1990 as his career continued to grow.

Early clients included the Los Angeles Daily Journal, a newspaper for the legal community for whom Halper would continue to do work during the first seven years of his career. Moving to an expanded studio in 1995, Halper traveled much of the country on assignment for trade publications during the late 1990s. Halper became widely known partly because of his web presence, which dates back to 1996 when he discovered the internet. After the technology crash in 2000 and the decline in trade magazine resources, his clientele switched primarily to corporate and advertising clients. In 2002 his business expanded and a new studio on the same property as his Silver Lake home was opened. Over the next several years he became active in architectural and still life photography, in addition to his now well-established expertise in selling portraiture.

In September 2007 Halper was married to Jennifer Hunt, a visual effects compositor and lighter for feature films at Sony Imageworks.

Halper's featured television appearances include Starting Over, 10 Years Younger, Fitness Fantasy, and Designing Your Life.

== Fine-art photography ==
In his first book project, Low Overhead (2004), Halper photographed models in a studio with limited headroom. Said Halper, "I wanted to see how people reacted in a space where they didn't have any real experience in how to comport themselves." The resulting lighthearted images were featured from August to October 2005 in the Arclight Cinemas Gallery in Hollywood, published as a mini-book, and released as an Apple Dashboard widget.

In The Bed Project (2005–2006), Halper's subjects dressed as they normally would for bed and brought their own bedding to his studio, allowing Halper to get "a playfulness out of people they wouldn't normally show in front of a camera."

Halper says, "The key to my work is simplicity. I take out everything that isn’t absolutely necessary, until the only elements that remain are those that are entirely essential. The best photographs are usually the simplest."
