= Angelo Heilprin =

American scientist (1853–1907)

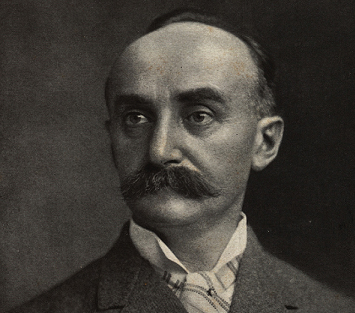
- Born: March 31, 1853; Sátoraljaújhely, Zemplén County, Kingdom of Hungary
- Died: July 17, 1907 (aged 54)
- Known for: Participation in the Peary expedition to Greenland, research on the 1902 eruption of Mount Pelée
- Relatives: Louis Heilprin (brother), Michael Heilprin (father), Phineas Mendel Heilprin (grandfather)
- Awards: American Philosophical Society membership
- Scientific career
- Fields: Geology, paleontology, natural history
- Workplaces: Academy of Natural Sciences, Wagner Free Institute of Science, Yale University

Angelo Heilprin (March 31, 1853 – July 17, 1907) was an American geologist, paleontologist, naturalist, and explorer.

He is mostly known for the part he took into the Peary expedition to Greenland of 1891–1892 and for his observations and photographs of the 1902 eruption of Montagne Pelée in Martinique.

He also was a mountaineer and a painter.

== Biography ==
Angelo Heilprin was born at Sátoraljaújhely, in the Zemplén County of the Kingdom of Hungary. His family was Jewish. He arrived in the United States from the Austrian Empire with his father Michael and his brother Louis in 1856.

He went back to Europe in 1876 for two years to complete his education. He studied at the Royal School of Mines, London, at the Imperial Geological Institution of Vienna, and at Florence (where he had his only formal training in painting) and Geneva; he also went to Hungary, where he mountaineered in the Carpathians, and to Poland where he visited family for six months.

He then became professor of invertebrate paleontology and of geology at the Academy of Natural Sciences, Philadelphia (1880–1900), curator of the museum of that institution (1883–1892), professor of geology at the Wagner Free Institute of Science in Philadelphia (1885–1890); and he was the first president of the Geographical Society of Philadelphia, serving for seven years. In 1883, he was elected as a member to the American Philosophical Society.

Also a painter, Heilprin exhibited Autumn's First Whisper at the Pennsylvania Academy of the Fine Arts in 1880, and Forest Exiles at the Boston Museum of Fine Arts in 1883.

In 1902 he founded the American Alpine Club.

In 1904, he was appointed as a lecturer at Yale.

=== Research ===
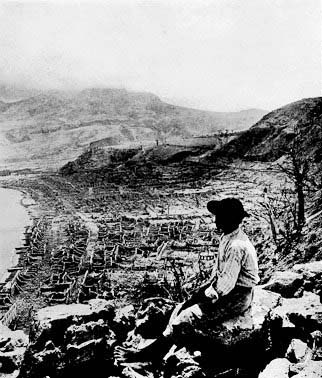
One of Heilprin's most famous photographs: the ruined city of Saint-Pierre, with the Montagne Pelée volcano lost in cloud in the background

In Heilprin's life research travels alternate with periods of teaching and writing. He visited Florida, the Bermudas, Mexico, Greenland and Martinique while also devoting work to his more immediate surroundings. His mountaineering skills were put to use many times in his scientific work.

In 1886, Heilprin undertook an expedition to the then little-known west coast of Florida.
In 1887 he went to the Bermudas with members of his classes to study coral reefs, confirming Charles Darwin's 1842 views expressed in The structure and distribution of coral reefs.
In 1888, Heilprin was in Mexico, where he ascended volcanos: Ixtaccihuatl, Nevado de Toluca, Pico de Orizaba and Popocatepetl, establishing their altitudes with barometric measures. He also shed light on questions about the geology of the Yucatan and the coral reefs of the western Gulf of Mexico.

En 1891 Heilprin embarked with Robert Peary on an expedition to Greenland organized by the Academy of Natural Sciences. Peary was the leader of the north-bound expedition, which was to prove that Greenland is an island. Heilprin headed the "Western Expedition" comprising half a dozen scientists. The scientists collected data then returned to the U.S., while Peary remained in Greenland. But the next year Heilprin was back to Greenland, leading the "Peary relief expedition".

In 1902, when Montagne Pelée in Martinique erupted, reducing the city of Saint-Pierre to ashes, Heilprin was one of the first scientists to arrive to the site. His works, photographs and eyewitness account of the phenomena and their consequences are unique. He was the first geologist to ascend a side of the crater. He revisited it in 1903 and in February 1906 descended into the crater itself.

=== Remembrance ===
- In 1976 the American Alpine Club established a yearly "Angelo Heilprin Citation".
- The Heilprin Glacier, having its terminus at the head of the Inglefield Fjord in NW Greenland, was named after him by Robert Peary.

==== Eponymy ====
- Boana heilprini
- Cyanocorax heilprini (the azure-naped jay), a species in the family of Corvidae, was named after him.
- Hypsiboas heilprini also bears his name.

== Selected works and documents ==
=== Selected works ===
- Contributions to the Tertiary geology and paleontology of the United States. Philadelphia: The Author. 1884. Online at Google Books
- Town geology: the lesson of the Philadelphia rocks: studies of nature along the highways and among the byways of a metropolitan town. Philadelphia: The Author. 1885. hdl:2027/nyp.33433062726991.
- The geographical and geological distribution of animals. New York: D. Appleton. 1887.
- Explorations on the west coast of Florida and in the Okeechobee wilderness: with special reference to the geology and zoology of the Floridian Peninsula: a narrative of researches undertaken under the auspices of the Wagner Free Institute of Science of Philadelphia. Philadelphia: The Institute. 1887. Online at Google Books
- The geological evidences of evolution. Philadelphia: The Author. 1888. Online at Google Books
- The animal life of our seashore: with special reference to the New Jersey coast and the southern shore of Long Island. Philadelphia: J. B. Lippincott Co. 1888. Online at Google Books
- The Bermuda Islands: a contribution to the physical history and zoology of the Somers archipelago: with an examination of the structure of coral reefs. Philadelphia: The Author. 1889. Online at Google Books
- The iconographic encyclopaedia of the arts and scien /. Bilder-Atlas : Iconographische Encyclopaedie.German. --. Philadelphia: Iconographic Publishing Co. 1890. hdl:2027/umn.31951002033205a. Volume VII of The iconographic encyclopaedia
- The Arctic problem and narrative of the Peary relief expedition of the Academy of natural sciences of Philadelphia. Philadelphia: Contemporary Publishing Co. 1893. hdl:2027/yale.39002065517949.
- The earth and its story: a first book of geology. New York, Boston: Silver, Burdett and Co. 1896. hdl:2027/uc2.ark:/13960/t56d5qw3v.
- Alaska and the Klondike: a journey to the New Eldorado, with hints to the traveller. London: C. A. Pearson. 1899.
- Mont Pelée and the tragedy of Martinique: a study of the great catastrophes of 1902, with observations and experiences in the field. Philadelphia, London: J. B. Lippincott. 1903.
- The Tower of Pelée: new studies of the great volcano of Martinique. Philadelphia, London: J. B. Lippincott Co. 1904.
- The eruption of Pelée: a summary and discussion of the phenomena and their sequels. Philadelphia: Geographical Society of Philadelphia. 1908. LCCN 08017912.

=== Articles for the general public ===
- Popular Science Monthly articles by Heilprin can be found on Wikisource

=== With Louis Heilprin ===
- Lippincott's new gazetteer: a complete pronouncing gazetteer or geographical dictionary of the world, containing the most recent and authentic information respecting the countries, cities, towns, resorts, islands, rivers, mountains, seas, lakes, etc., in every portion of the globe, Philadelphia, J. B. Lippincott Co., 2 vol., 1916, ©1911 New edition: 1922

=== Documents ===
- Documents (1871–1896) in the archives of the Philadelphia Academy of Natural Sciences. Includes 34 items, among them part of a diary of the expedition to Greenland; not included in the total: 18 stereographs of the eruption of Montagne Pelée
