= Alperovich =

Alperovich is a Jewish surname. Notable people with the surname include:

- Beatriz Rojkés de Alperovich (born 1956), Argentine psychopedagogue, businesswoman, and politician, wife of José
- José Alperovich (born 1955), Argentine politician
