= Phineas Mendel Heilprin =

American Jewish scholar (1801–1863)

- Born: Phineas Mendel Heilprin; November 1801; Lublin, Poland
- Died: January 30, 1863 (aged 61); Washington, D.C., United States
- Occupations: Jewish scholar, merchant, manufacturer
- Known for: Writings on Jewish religious thought and opposition to Jewish reform movements
- Movement: Haskalah

Phineas (also "Phinehas") Mendel Heilprin (November 1801 in Lublin, Poland – 30 January 1863 in Washington, D.C., United States) was a Jewish scholar.

He early settled in Piotrków and subsequently in Tomaszów, where he became a manufacturer and merchant, but, in consequence of oppression by the Russian government, he removed in 1842 to Hungary. His sympathy was with the people in 1848, and after the failure of the revolutionary movement he determined to leave the country. In 1859 he came to the United States, remaining there until his death. He was a close student of the Talmud, and also of the Greek and later German philosophers, acquiring a high reputation among Jewish scholars as a religious traditionalist with openness to ideals of the Haskalah. His works, written in Hebrew, include several controversial writings, dealing with the reform movement among the Jews.

Among his students was the writer Leon Mendelsburg.

== Family ==
His son Michael was actively involved in the revolutions of 1848 in Hungary and also emigrated to the United States.

His grandson Angelo was a geologist, paleontologist, naturalist, and explorer in the US.

== See also ==
- Heilprin
