= Jackie Alpers =

American photographer

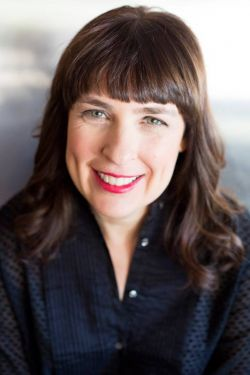
- Jackie Alpers, 2020
- Born: Jacqueline Sue Alpers; April 1, 1968 (age 58); Columbus, Ohio, U.S.
- Education: Columbus College of Art & Design
- Occupations: Food photographer, cookbook author, food journalist
- Notable work: Sprinkles!: Recipes and Ideas for Rainbowlicious Desserts, Taste of Tucson, The Unofficial Yellowstone Cookbook
- Website: www.jackiealpers.com

Jackie Alpers (born April 1, 1968) is an American food photographer, food writer, recipe developer, and cookbook author based in Tucson, Arizona. She is known for her editorial and commercial food photography and expertise in Sonoran-style Southwestern cuisine.

== Early life and education ==
Alpers was born in Columbus, Ohio, and earned a BFA in photography from the Columbus College of Art & Design in 1991.

== Career ==
Alpers began her professional career as a photo editor before transitioning into food photography and cookbook authorship. Her early work included assignments for regional publications and advertising clients, where she developed a distinctive style characterized by vibrant colors, close-up compositions, and narrative-driven imagery.

She has collaborated with major media outlets such as Food Network, The Kitchn, Refinery29, and Good Morning America, providing photography, recipes, and styling. Her recipes have been featured internationally and adapted for television segments, digital media, and print.

In 2013, she published Sprinkles!: Recipes and Ideas for Rainbowlicious Desserts, a whimsical dessert cookbook that celebrates the use of colorful confections. This was followed in 2020 by Taste of Tucson, which was named an official Arizona Centennial Cookbook and received praise for its authentic representation of Sonoran cuisine. Her 2024 title, The Unofficial Yellowstone Cookbook, draws inspiration from the popular television series and explores the food culture of the American West.

Alpers' work has been exhibited in photography shows and culinary events, and she has taught workshops on food photography techniques for professional and amateur photographers. Her photography is frequently cited for its ability to blend storytelling with commercial appeal, influencing a new generation of social media food content creators.

== Publications ==
- Taste of Tucson: Sonoran-Style Recipes Inspired by the Rich Culture of Southern Arizona (West Margin Press, 2020) – author and photographer.
- Sprinkles!: Recipes and Ideas for Rainbowlicious Desserts (Quirk Books, 2013) – author and photographer.
- Contributing photographer on numerous cookbooks, including Angry Birds, Bad Piggies Best Egg Recipes (2012) and Mexican Cooking (2010).

== Awards and recognition ==
Alpers has received:

- Multiple American Photography selections
- IPA Lucie Awards
- Gold Muse Photography Award
- Black & White Spider Awards
- RUSA Book and Media Award for Taste of Tucson
- Inducted into the 12th Taste Awards Hall of Fame for food and beverage photography (2025)
- Described as “the world’s most famous food photographer” by Shotkit and Art in Context and ranked #7 Best Food Photographer in the World by Great Big Photography World (2024)
- Named Best Cookbook Food Photographer (USA) in the Global Excellence Awards (LUXlife Magazine, 2022); and Best Global Food Photographer in the Creative and Visual Arts Awards (LUXlife Magazine, 2024)
