= Steve Alperin =

American media executive

- Education: BA in government from Harvard University; MBA from Columbia University
- Occupations: CEO SurvivorNet; Media Executive, Producer, and Writer at ABC News; Chief Business Officer of the news outlet Vocativ
- Writing career
- Language: English
- Notable awards: Two awards from the Writers Guild of America

Steve Alperin is a media executive, producer, and writer.

== Education ==
Alperin holds an MBA from Columbia University and a BA in government from Harvard University.

== Career ==
Alperin is the founder and CEO of cancer information platform SurvivorNet. He worked as a writer and producer at ABC News and was senior producer for Peter Jennings' lead news broadcast.

He was the editor in charge of ABC's website in 2006 when it broke the scandal involving Congressmen Mark Foley and sexually explicit emails to underage congressional pages. The Foley story and its evolution are cited as important moments in the use of the internet to further investigative reporting at a major news organization. Some debate still exists about the timing of the story only a few months before the 2006 mid-term elections, and to what degree the scandal suppressed turnout.

In 2010 Alperin joined the staff of The Daily, an iPad-only news app created by Rupert Murdoch's news organization.

In 2013 Alperin became the Chief Business Officer of the news outlet Vocativ. He and his co-founder Scott Cohen met at ABC News and hired other prominent journalists to work towards combating fake news. In 2015, he left the company following a reorganization of its leadership.

In 2018 he co-founded SurvivorNet, a website to provide information to people with cancer. His idea spurred from his father's cancer diagnosis and the absence of clear information about it. Alperin has been recognized as a prominent speaker on cancer research by The Atlantic's "People v. Cancer" panel.

== Awards ==
Alperin is the recipient of two awards from the Writers Guild of America, including one for the feature "Reagan's Funeral".
