= F. X. Gouraud =

French physician and dietitian

Francois Xavier Gouraud
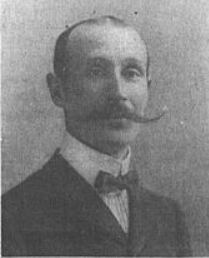
- Born: 1877
- Died: 1913 (age 36)
- Occupations: Physician, dietitian

Francois Xavier Gouraud (1877–1913) was a French physician and dietitian.

Gouraud was born to a medical family. His father was a doctor at the Hôpital de la Charité. Gouraud studied medicine as an intern in Paris hospitals at the age of 21. His thesis in 1903 was on phosphorus exchanges in the normal and pathological organism. He became head of Paul Georges Dieulafoy's clinic at Hôtel-Dieu, Paris. He was chief of laboratory at the Faculty of Medicine of Paris.

Gouraud's best known work on dietetics was Que Faut-Il Manger?. It was translated as What Shall I Eat? in 1911. Armand Gautier wrote a preface for the book. It was positively reviewed in medical journals. The book is an impartial survey of important dietary questions and the reasons why specific foods should be consumed or rejected according to normal or pathological conditions. It was described in a review as a "scientifically correct discussion of nutrition and diet, from the common food standpoint."

The book is notable for its chapters on alcohol, vegetarianism and white bread. Gouraud concluded that a strict vegetarian diet is inadvisable for most people but a modified version with eggs and milk (ovo-lacto vegetarianism) is more rational. He favoured an omnivorous (mixed diet) as the most suitable diet for mankind. A review for the original French version in the British Medical Journal commented that "the book will be found useful by any practitioner who wishes to construct a dietary for any purpose, and the cautions and recommendations contained in it are sound". A criticism of the English translation was that it contained typological errors.

== Selected publications ==
- What Shall I Eat?: A Manual of Rational Feeding (translated by Francis J. Rebman, 1911)
- Le livre du Médecin: La Tuberculose (1912)
