= Carolyn Halpern =

American developmental psychologist and professor

Carolyn Tucker Halpern
- Education: University of Houston
- Scientific career
- Fields: Developmental psychology
- Workplaces: University of North Carolina at Chapel Hill
- Thesis: Personality correlates of maturational timing in black and white females (1982)

Carolyn Tucker Halpern is an American developmental psychologist and Professor in the UNC Gillings School of Global Public Health, where she is Chair of the Department of Maternal and Child Health. She is also the deputy director of the National Longitudinal Study of Adolescent Health.

Halpern graduated summa cum laude from the University of Houston in 1976 with a BS in psychology. She then earned a MA (1979) and a PhD (1982) in developmental psychology also from the University of Houston.
