= Isaiah Rivera =

Puerto Rican basketball dunker (born 1997)

Personal information
- Born: September 26, 1997 (age 29) Mayagüez, Puerto Rico
- Listed height: 6 ft 2 in (1.88 m)
- Listed weight: 183 lb (83 kg)

Isaiah Rivera is a Puerto Rican professional dunker. He has completed dunks like the 360 double between the legs, and the 360 between the legs behind the back. He is also reached the former world record vertical jump of 50.5 inches, which was tested at dunk camp. Due to his performances, Rivera is also known by the nickname "The Puerto Rican Airbender" and is recognized as one of the top dunkers in the world.

== Professional dunking ==
Rivera started competing in dunk contests during the late 2010s. In July 2019, Rivera entered the Quai 54 dunk contest at Paris, winning the event by dunking over professional basketball center Blake Griffin. Afterwards he competed in Fiba 3x3 Dunk Contests, opening his participation by finishing second at the Mexico City Open. He advanced to the final stop by securing the gold at the Montreal Open. Rivera defeated Piotr Grabowski and Dmitry Krivenko at the Utsunomiya Final to close the season.

By this time, Rivera had a vertical jump of 46" and continued to work on his vertical and jumping skill with the express intention of setting a world record. He developed a six-day regime that included three days of heavy weightlifting, two days of circuit training and another of practicing and creating new dunking combinations. He competed at dunk league, and won some of the competitions. Around this time Rivera also went to dunk camp and tested his world record 50.5 inch vertical leap. At dunk camp Rivera managed to achieve the black band of dunking, which requires a scorpion dunk, a two hand behind the back or one hand 360 degree behind the back dunk, an eastbay dunk, an under both legs dunk, and a 43 inch vertical, all in one session.

In July 2026, Rivera was included in a Shaquille O'Neal and TNT Sports collaboration, DUNKMAN, a professional league that aired on national television. He was placed into the competition's Group C qualifier and advanced to the final, where he scored 8.90 in his first dunk and leaping completely over a woman standing in the paint, catching a mid-air pass and landing for a score 9.35 that won the pool. With this performance, Rivera qualified for the first DUNKMAN World Championship.

== Personal life ==
Rivera's early life was documented by his college classmates in the documentary Not Surviving But Living. After graduating from UCF in a major focused around kinesiology and exercise science, he moved in with vertical jump coach John Evans and started a business with him called THP Strength. Rivera and Evans trained athletes by holding annual camps, and coached 4 of the highest jumpers in the world. Among the people he has advised is National Basketball Association (NBA) Slam Dunk Contest winner Glenn Robinson III.
