= Bertha De Vriese =

Belgian physician

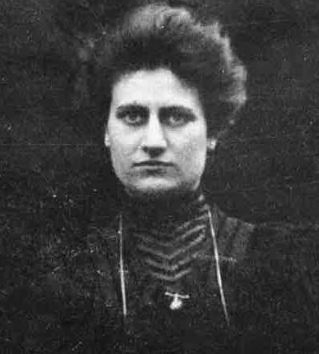
- 1904 at the Anatomical Convention of Jena
- Born: Bertha Coletta Constantia De Vriese; 26 September 1877; Ghent, Belgium
- Died: 17 March 1958 (aged 80); Ghent, Belgium
- Other names: Bertha Vercoullie
- Occupation: physician
- Years active: 1903–1958
- Spouse: Josef Vercouillie

Bertha De Vriese (26 September 1877 – 17 March 1958) was a Belgian physician. When she earned her degree as a doctor of medicine at Ghent University, where she was the first woman to conduct research and the first woman physician to graduate from the school. Although she was not allowed to pursue an academic career, De Vriese opened a private pediatric clinic and served as the director of the Children's Ward at the Bijloke Hospital in Ghent. In 1914, she married Josef Vercouillie, also a physician.

== Early life and education ==
Bertha Coletta Constantia De Vriese was born on 26 September 1877 in the Coupure neighborhood of Ghent, Belgium to Coralie Pannenmaeker and Lodewijk De Vriese (nl).

Until 1864, secondary education did not exist for women in Belgium and women were not able to attend tertiary schooling until the University of Brussels opened to them in 1876. A law passed in 1890 that allowed women the right to attend medical school, but it required that women have a certificate for secondary schooling or pass an equivalency test.

Home schooled to prepare for her university studies, De Vriese passed the exams of the Central Jury in 1893. She immediately enrolled in the Ghent University, as the first woman admitted to medical school in Ghent. Her degree was given summa cum laude with a diploma for medicine, obstetrics, and gynecology in 1900, as the first female graduate in medicine. The following year she was awarded a prize and distinction as Laureate in the University Competition, which also earned her a gold medal from the mayor of the city of Ghent.

Competing with the male students, her paper, Etudier les modifications que la distribution des vaisseaux sanguins des extrémités subit chez l'homme au cours du développement (Investigating the changes humans undergo on the distribution of blood vessels in the extremities during development) was awarded 95 out of 100 possible points. The fellowship she earned as laureate was for the period from 1899 to 1901. It allowed her to study abroad in Berlin, Freiburg, London, Munich, Paris, Strasbourg, Vienna, and Zürich.

== Career ==
De Vriese returned to Ghent in 1903 and applied for a position in the anatomy laboratory of Hector Leboucq, hoping to have an academic career. There was no precedent for a woman to work in a laboratory and Leboucq sought approval from the faculty council, the rector, and the managing inspector from the Education Ministry before consent was given.

De Vriese was hired as the first woman to serve as an assistant in an anatomy laboratory. If she was able to complete a two-year training and successfully published during her assistanceship, De Vriese would be able to become an associate professor and eventually a full professor.

In 1905, she obtained her specialist certification in anatomy with the dissertation Recherches sur la morphologie de l'artère basilaire (Research on the morphology of the basilar artery). At this time, the university was undergoing to change in curriculum to focus more on research and De Vriese applied for an extension to her assistant's position to gain the necessary requirements for a lead researcher. Although praised by her colleagues, the rector, and the minister, the ministry refused to grant the extension.

After a protracted period of petitioning, De Vriese left Ghent University in 1908 and Leboucq approved the candidacy of his son for the position. That same year, De Vriese took a position at the Bijloke Hospital as a service provider in the pediatric ward.

In 1914, she married a doctor, Josef Vercouillie. That same year she opened a private practice for children's health care. She later became the head of the pediatric department of the Bijloke Hospital and served as a medical inspector for the public schools.

== Death and legacy ==
De Vriese died on 17 March 1958 in Ghent. The samples of bones, muscles, and organs that she collected and prepared for study are preserved at the Anatomical Museum of the Department of Basic Medical Sciences. There is a dormitory on the campus of Ghent University which bears her name.
