= Galperin =

Galperin is an (Eastern) Jewish surname, derived from Heilprin / Halperin. The Russian feminine form is Galperina. Notable people with the surname include:

- Eleonora Galperina, better known as Nora Gal (1912–1991), Soviet writer and translator
- Eva Galperin, director of cybersecurity at the Electronic Frontier Foundation
- Evsey Galperin (1920–1990), Soviet geophysicist, inventor of the symmetric triaxial seismometer design (Galperin configuration)
- Gleb Galperin (born 1985), Russian individual and synchronized diver who competed in the 2004, 2008 and 2012 Summer Olympics
- Marcos Galperin (born 1971), Argentine businessman
- Mark Galperin (born 1968 or 1969), Russian political activist
- Revekka Galperina (1894–1974), Soviet editor and translator
- Ron Galperin (born 1963), American politician and lawyer
- Yefim Galperin (born 1947), Russian-American film producer, director, scenarist, journalist and writer

== See also ==
- Gelperin, a list of people with a similar surname also derived from Heilprin
- Heilbronn (disambiguation)
