= Heilbronner =

Surname of notable chemist, mathematician, economist, and baseball manager

Heilbronner or Heilbroner is a surname. Notable people with the surname include:

- Edgar Heilbronner (1921–2006), Swiss German chemist
- Johann Christoph Heilbronner (1706–1745), German mathematical historian and theologian
- Louie Heilbroner (1861–1933), American baseball manager
- Robert Heilbroner (1919–2005), American economist and historian of economic thought

== See also ==
- Emanuel Bronner (1908–1997)
- Weber & Heilbroner, New York City 20th century men's clothing company
- Heilbronner Hohenloher Haller Nahverkehr (HNV or H3NV), a regional transport cooperative
- Heilbronn (disambiguation)
