= Gelperin =

Gelperin is a surname. Notable people with the surname include:

- Alan Gelperin, the scientist and biologist currently at Princeton University.
- Dave Gelperin chaired the working groups developing the IEEE 829-1989 software testing documentation standard.
- Nison Gelperin (1903–1989), the Soviet chemical engineer who designed the FAB-5000 bomb.

== See also ==
- Galperin, a list of people with the surname
- Halperin, a list of people with the surname
- Galperina, a list of people with the surname
