= Halperin =

Halperin (sometimes spelled as Halparin or Hailperin) is a variation of the Jewish surname Heilprin. Both forms are Southern Yiddish for Heilbrun, that is the German city Heilbronn. The name is sometimes transliterated into the Cyrillic alphabet as Galperin (the Russian letter Ge used to be pronounced closer to German H in many words).

The German form of the Jewish surname is Heilbronn.

Notable people with this surname include:

- Bertrand Halperin (born 1941), American theoretical physicist
- David M. Halperin (born 1952), American theorist in gender studies, queer theory and other fields
- Donald Halperin (1945–2006), New York politician
- Elchonon Halpern, (1921–2015), Grand Rabbi of Golders Green. In Hebrew spelt היילפרין, literally pronounced 'Heilprin'
- Emmanuel Halperin, (born 1943), Israeli media personality
- Ian Halperin (born 1964), Canadian investigative journalist, writer and documentary filmmaker
- Israel Halperin (1911–2007), Canadian academic
- Isser Halperin, later Isser Harel (1912–2003), spymaster of the intelligence and the security services of Israel
- James L. Halperin (born 1952), American author and businessman
- Mark Halperin (born 1965), American political analyst
- Maurice Halperin (1906–1995), American writer, professor and diplomat
- Michel Halpérin (1948–2014), Swiss lawyer and politician
- Monte Halparin, later Monty Hall (1921–2017), American game show host
- Morton Halperin (born 1938), American expert on foreign policy and civil liberties
- Nan Halperin, (1898–1963), Russian immigrant to the USA who became a well-known singing comedian
- Paul Hailperin (born 1947), German instrumentmaker and oboist
- Robert Halperin (1928–1985), American yachtsman, football player, and businessman
- Samara Halperin, American artist
- Shirley Halperin, American journalist, editor, and author.
- Sol Halperin (1902–1977), American special effects artist
- Tamar Halperin (born 1976), Israeli harpsichordist, pianist and musicologist
- Theodore Hailperin (1915–2014), American mathematician
- Tulio Halperin Donghi (1926–2014), Argentine historian
- Uzziel Halperin, later Uzzi Ornan (1923–2022), Israeli linguist
- Victor Halperin (1895–1983), American film director, producer, and writer
- Yotam Halperin (born 1984), Israeli basketball player

== See also ==
- Galperin/Galperina, a list of people with the surname
- Gelperin, a list of people with the surname
- Halpern
- Halprin
