= VRP =

VRP may refer to:

== Computing and mathematics ==
- Vehicle routing problem, a problem in combinatorial optimization
- Virtual resource partitioning, an operating system-level virtualization technology
- Vulnerability rewards program, another name for a Bug bounty program

== Organisations ==
- VRP Music, a venture of American record producer, executive producer and an independent record label owner Rob Halprin
- People's Justice Party (German: Volksrechtpartei), also known as the Reich Party for Civil Rights and Deflation, a political party active in the Weimar Republic in Germany
- Vehicle Recycling Partnership, operated by the US Council for Automotive Research to support cash for cars vehicle recycling

== Other uses ==
- Voyageur, représentant et placier French administrative and professional status of salesmen
- Pedrinho VRP, alias of Brazilian footballer Pedro Luís Vicençote doing business as a football agent
- Volatility risk premium, a measure of extra premium demanded by sellers of a security in order to compensate for volatility
