= Peter Bernstein =

Peter Bernstein may refer to:

- Peter Bernstein (composer) (born 1951), American film and television composer
- Peter Bernstein (guitarist) (born 1967), American jazz guitarist
- Peter L. Bernstein (1919–2009), American financial author, economist and educator
