= Helbronner =

Helbronner may refer to:

== People with the surname ==
- Jacques Helbronner (1873-1943), French Jewish official.
- Paul Helbronner (1871–1938), French alpinist.

== Locations ==
- Pointe Helbronner, a mountain the Alps.

== See also ==
- Heilbronner
