= Halprin =

Halprin is a surname. Notable people with the surname include:

- Alexander Halprin (1868–1921), Russian-Austrian chess master
- Anna Halprin (1920–2021), American dancer
- Daria Halprin (born 1948), American psychologist
- Lawrence Halprin (1916–2009), American landscape architect
- Randy Halprin (born 1963), American convict
- Rob Halprin (born 1958), American record producer
- Rose Halprin (1896–1978), American Zionist leader

== See also ==
- Halperin
- Halprin Open Space Sequence
