= Software test documentation =

IEEE standard

== Status of IEEE 829 ==
Note: IEEE 829-2008 has been superseded by ISO/IEC/IEEE 29119-3:2013.

== Background to IEEE 829 ==
IEEE 829-2008, also known as the 829 Standard for Software and System Test Documentation, was an IEEE standard that specified the form of a set of documents for use in eight defined stages of software testing and system testing, each stage potentially producing its own separate type of document. The standard specified the format of these documents, but did not stipulate whether they must all be produced, nor did it include any criteria regarding adequate content for these documents. These were a matter of judgment outside the purview of the standard.

== Documents Required by IEEE 829 ==
The documents are:

- Master Test Plan (MTP): The purpose of the Master Test Plan (MTP) is to provide an overall test planning and test management document for multiple levels of test (either within one project or across multiple projects).
- Level Test Plan (LTP): For each LTP the scope, approach, resources, and schedule of the testing activities for its specified level of testing need to be described. The items being tested, the features to be tested, the testing tasks to be performed, the personnel responsible for each task, and the associated risk(s) need to be identified.
- Level Test Design (LTD): Detailing test cases and the expected results as well as test pass criteria.
- Level Test Case (LTC): Specifying the test data for use in running the test cases identified in the Level Test Design.
- Level Test Procedure (LTPr): Detailing how to run each test, including any set-up preconditions and the steps that need to be followed.
- Level Test Log (LTL): To provide a chronological record of relevant details about the execution of tests, e.g. recording which tests cases were run, who ran them, in what order, and whether each test passed or failed.
- Anomaly Report (AR): To document any event that occurs during the testing process that requires investigation. This may be called a problem, test incident, defect, trouble, issue, anomaly, or error report. This document is deliberately named as an anomaly report, and not a fault report. The reason is that a discrepancy between expected and actual results can occur for a number of reasons other than a fault in the system. These include the expected results being wrong, the test being run incorrectly, or inconsistency in the requirements meaning that more than one interpretation could be made. The report consists of all details of the incident such as actual and expected results, when it failed, and any supporting evidence that will help in its resolution. The report will also include, if possible, an assessment of the impact of an incident upon testing.
- Level Interim Test Status Report (LITSR): To summarise the interim results of the designated testing activities and optionally to provide evaluations and recommendations based on the results for the specific test level.
- Level Test Report (LTR): To summarise the results of the designated testing activities and to provide evaluations and recommendations based on the results after test execution has finished for the specific test level.
- Master Test Report (MTR): To summarise the results of the levels of the designated testing activities and to provide evaluations based on these results. This report may be used by any organisation using the MTP. A management report providing any important information uncovered by the tests accomplished, and including assessments of the quality of the testing effort, the quality of the software system under test, and statistics derived from Anomaly Reports. The report also records what testing was done and how long it took, in order to improve any future test planning. This final document is used to indicate whether the software system under test is fit for purpose according to whether or not it has met acceptance criteria defined by project stakeholders.

== Use of IEEE 829 ==
The standard formed part of the training syllabus of the ISEB Foundation and Practitioner Certificates in Software Testing promoted by the British Computer Society. ISTQB, following the formation of its own syllabus based on ISEB's and Germany's ASQF syllabi, also adopted IEEE 829 as the reference standard for software and system test documentation.

Dr. David Gelperin and Dr. William C. Hetzel developed the Systematic Test and Evaluation Process (STEP) methodology in order to implement the original IEEE-829 Standard for Software Test Documentation.
