= Foreign Languages Publishing House (Soviet Union) =

Soviet publisher

- Founded: 1946
- Defunct: 1963
- Successor: Progress Publishers, Mir Publishers
- Country of origin: Soviet Union
- Headquarters location: 21 Zubovsky Boulevard, Moscow

The Foreign Languages Publishing House (Russian: Издательство иностранной литературы) was a Soviet state-run foreign-language publisher of Russian literature, novels, propaganda, and books about the USSR. Headquartered in Moscow at 21 Zubovsky Boulevard, the publishing house was founded in 1946, and in 1964 was split into two separate publishers, Progress and Mir.

== Book series ==
=== English-language titles ===
- Arts Library
- Books for Socialism
- Classics of Russian Literature
- Documents of the First International
- Heredity and It's Variability
- Library of Marxist–Leninist Classics
- Library of Selected Soviet Literature
- Library of Soviet Literature
- Library of Soviet Short Stories
- Men of Russian Science
- Outline History of the USSR
- Political Education Series
- Soviet Arts Series
- Soviet Children's Library for Tiny Tots
- Soviet Literature for Young People

=== French-language titles ===
- Arts
- Bibliothèque de la littérature soviétique
- Les classiques de la littérature
- Les classiques du marxisme-leninisme
- Les classiques russes
- Critique littéraire
- Littérature pour la jeunesse
- Littérature soviétique pour l'enfance et l'adolescence
- Littérature soviétique pour enfants
- Nouvelles soviétiques
- La science russe et ses hommes
- Série Anticipation

== See also ==
- Foreign Languages Press, Beijing – similar state-run publisher in China
- Foreign Languages Publishing House, Pyongyang – similar state-run publisher in North Korea
- Foreign Languages Publishing House, Hanoi – similar state-run publisher in Vietnam, now known as Thế Giới Publishers
- Revekka Galperina – prolific translator for the Soviet publisher
