= Robert Heilbroner =

American economist (1919–2005)

- Born: March 24, 1919; New York City, U.S.
- Died: January 4, 2005 (aged 85); New York City, U.S.
- Scientific career
- Fields: Economics
- Workplaces: Federal Office of Price Administration, New School for Social Research, Wall Street commodities firm.

Robert L. Heilbroner (March 24, 1919 – January 4, 2005) was an American economist and historian of economic thought. The author of some two dozen books, Heilbroner was best known for The Worldly Philosophers: The Lives, Times and Ideas of the Great Economic Thinkers (1953), a survey of the lives and contributions of famous economists, notably Adam Smith, Karl Marx, and John Maynard Keynes.

== Early life and education ==
Heilbroner was born in 1919, in New York City, to a wealthy German Jewish family. His father, Louis Heilbroner, was a businessman who founded the men's clothing retailer Weber & Heilbroner. Robert graduated from Harvard University in 1940 with a summa cum laude degree in philosophy, government and economics. During World War II, he served in the United States Army and worked at the Office of Price Control under John Kenneth Galbraith, the celebrated institutional economist.

== Career ==
After World War II, Heilbroner worked briefly as a banker and entered into academia in the 1950s as a research fellow at the New School for Social Research in New York. During this period, he was highly influenced by the German economist Adolph Lowe, who was a foremost representative of the German Historical School. In 1963, Heilbroner earned a Ph.D. in Economics from the New School for Social Research, where he was subsequently appointed Norman Thomas Professor of Economics in 1971, and where he remained for more than twenty years. He mainly taught History of Economic Thought courses at the New School.

Although a highly unconventional economist, who regarded himself as more of a social theorist and "worldly philosopher" (philosopher pre-occupied with "worldly" affairs, such as economic structures), and who tended to integrate the disciplines of history, economics and philosophy, Heilbroner was nevertheless recognized by his peers as a prominent economist. He was elected vice president of the American Economic Association in 1972.

He also came up with a way of classifying economies, as either Traditional (primarily agriculturally based, perhaps subsistence economy), Command (centrally planned economy, often involving the state), Market (capitalism), or Mixed.

Though an outspoken socialist for nearly his entire career, Heilbroner famously wrote in a 1989 article in The New Yorker prior to the collapse of the Soviet Union:

Less than 75 years after it officially began, the contest between capitalism and socialism is over: capitalism has won... Capitalism organizes the material affairs of humankind more satisfactorily than socialism.

He further wrote in Dissent in 1992 that "capitalism has been as unmistakable a success as socialism has been a failure" and complimented Milton Friedman, Friedrich Hayek, and Ludwig von Mises for their insistence on the free market's superiority. He emphasized that "democratic liberties have not yet appeared, except fleetingly, in any nation that has declared itself to be fundamentally anticapitalist." However, Heilbroner's preferred capitalist model was the highly redistributionist welfare states of Scandinavia; he stated that his model society was "a slightly idealized Sweden."

== Family ==
Robert Heilbroner had two sons, David and Peter Heilbroner, and four grandchildren, Quentin, Katrina, Henry, and Sam.

Heilbroner died in 2005 in New York City at the age of 85.

== The Worldly Philosophers ==
Published in 1953, The Worldly Philosophers: The Lives, Times and Ideas of the Great Economic Thinkers (1953) has sold nearly four million copies, making it the second-best-selling economics text of all time (the first being Paul Samuelson's Economics, a highly popular university textbook). The seventh edition of the book, published in 1999, included a new final chapter entitled "The End of Worldly Philosophy?", which included both a grim view on the existent state of economics as well as a hopeful vision for a "reborn worldly philosophy" that incorporated social aspects of capitalism. Its content is:

1. Introduction
2. The Economic Revolution
3. The Wonderful World of Adam Smith
4. The Gloomy Presentiments of Parson Malthus and David Ricardo
5. The Dreams of the Utopian Socialists
  about Robert Owen, Henri de Saint-Simon, Charles Fourier, and John Stuart Mill
6. The Inexorable System of Karl Marx
7. The Victorian World and the Underworld of Economics
  about Francis Ysidro Edgeworth, Frederic Bastiat, Henry George, John A. Hobson, and Alfred Marshall
8. The Savage Society of Thorstein Veblen
9. The Heresies of John Maynard Keynes
10. The Contradictions of Joseph Schumpeter
11. The End of the Worldly Philosophy?

== Selected works ==
- The Worldly Philosophers, 1953, Simon & Schuster, 7th edition, 1999: ISBN 0-684-86214-X
- The Quest For Wealth: A Study of Acquisitive Man, Simon & Schuster, 1956
- The Future as History, Harper & Row, 1960
- The Making of Economic Society, 1963, Prentice Hall, 10th edition 1992, 11th edition 2001: ISBN 0-13-091050-3 (the first edition served as his PhD dissertation)
- A Primer on Government Spending (with Peter L. Bernstein), New York: Vintage Books, 1963
- The Great Ascent: The Struggle for Economic Development In Our Time, Harper & Row, 1963
- The Limits of American Capitalism, Harper & Row, 1966
- "Do Machines Make History?" Technology and Culture 8 (July 1967): 335–345.
- The Economic Problem, 1968, Prentice Hall, First Edition, Englewood Cliffs, New Jersey (1968; later editions with James K. Galbraith, Lester Thurow)
- Between Capitalism and Socialism. Essays in Political Economics. Oct. 1970, Vintage Books and Random House. (A compilation of scattered publications.)
- Economic Relevance: A Second Look (with Arthur Ford), 1971, Goodyear Publishing Company, Inc., Palisades, California. ISBN 0-87620-262-8
- Understanding Macroeconomics, 1972, Fourth Edition, Prentice-Hall, Inc., Englewoods Cliffs, New Jersey, ISBN 0-13-936344-0
- An Inquiry into the Human Prospect, 1974, W. W. Norton, 2nd edition 1980: ISBN 0-393-95139-1, R. S. Means Company, 3rd edition 1991: ISBN 0-393-96185-0
- Business Civilization in Decline, Marion Boyars Pubs. Ltd., 1976. Also, Pelican Books, 1977: ISBN 0-14-022015-1
- The Economic Transformation of America: 1600 to the Present. New York: Harcourt Brace Jovanovich, 1977; 2d ed. (with Aaron Singer), 1984; 4th edition (Wadsworth Publishing), 1998, ISBN 0-15-505530-5.
- Marxism: For and Against. 1st ed. New York: W.W. Norton, 1980. ISBN 0-393-95166-9
- Economics Explained: Everything You Need to Know About How the Economy Works and Where It's Going (with Lester Thurow), 1982, 4th edition, 1998, ISBN 0-684-84641-1
- The Nature and Logic of Capitalism, 1985, W. W. Norton, ISBN 9780393955293
- Behind the Veil of Economics: Essays in the Worldly Philosophy, 1988, W. W. Norton, ISBN 0-393-30577-5
- The Debt and Deficit: False Alarms/Real Possibilities (with Peter L. Bernstein), 1989, W. W. Norton, ISBN 0-393-30611-9
- "Analysis and Vision in the History of Modern Economic Thought." Journal of Economic Literature (September 1990): 1097–1114. JSTOR 2727102
- 21st Century Capitalism, 1993, W. W. Norton hardcover: ISBN 0-88784-534-7, 1994 paperback: ISBN 0-393-31228-3.
- "Technological Determinism Revisited." In Does Technology Drive History? The Dilemma of Technological Determinism, edited by Merritt Roe Smith and Leo Marx, Cambridge, MA: MIT Press, 1994. ISBN 9780262193474
- The Crisis of Vision in Modern Economic Thought. (with William S. Milberg), 1995, Cambridge University Press, ISBN 0-521-49774-4
- Teachings from the Worldly Philosophy, W. W. Norton, 1996, ISBN 0-393-31607-6
- The Economic Transformation of America Since 1865 (with Alan Singer), Harcourt Brace College Publishers, 1997, ISBN 0-15-501242-8

== Awards ==
- 1979 Gerald Loeb Award Honorable Mention for Magazines
- 1984 Gerald Loeb Award for Editorial/Commentary for "Economic Prospects"
- 1985 Gerald Loeb Special Award for "The Deficit"
- 1988 Gerald Loeb Award for Magazines for "Hard Times"
