= Joseph Gaer =

Joseph Gaer (originally named Joseph Fishman) (1897-1969) was a Russian-born Jewish man who immigrated to the United States, where he became a university lecturer of literature, and then worked a number of government jobs including for the Federal Writers' Project. He also wrote and published, and founded a press and a publishing company.

== Background ==
Joseph Fishman was born on March 16, 1897, in Edineț, in what was then Bessarabia, now Moldova. He immigrated to the US in 1917, and studied there and in Canada.

== Career ==
Fishman became a lecturer at University of California, Berkeley, in 1930, and taught there until 1935, when he began working in a series of positions for the federal government: first, as editor and field supervisor for the Federal Writers' Project until 1935, then as a consultant for the Farm Security Administration until 1941, and then as a special assistant for the Secretary of the Treasury.

Gaer served as assistant to research director J. Raymond Walsh in the Congress of Industrial Organizations (CIO), a federation of industrial unions. In 1943, as Gaer, he joined the CIO-PAC, the first political action committee in the United States.

Already a writer and editor, in 1945 he founded the Pamphlet Press and served as a director. In 1946, he became president of Boni & Gaer, a publishing company, until 1949. Boni & Gaer authors included: George Seldes, Michael Sayers, Carl Van Doren, Hewlett Johnson, Warren Weaver, Richard Sasuly, Victor Heine Bernstein, Milton Crane, Justin Gray, Eugene Weinstock, Gordon Kahn, and I. F. Stone.

In June 1953, the Senate Internal Security Subcommittee announced its decision to subpoena Gaer (among others) as an ex-Treasury official as part of its efforts to investigate the relationship between Soviet defector Igor Gouzenko and Harry Dexter White, Helen Ware (sister of Harold Ware and daughter of Ella Bloor ("Mother Bloor"). That same month, when publishing a one-paragraph biography of Gaer, Congressional Record alleged that Direction, a magazine published by the Federal Workers Project, had been "pro-Communist."

== Death ==
Joseph Gaer died age 71 on December 7, 1969.

== Legacy ==
On June 9, 1945, the Daily Worker newspaper called Gaer "a master of the pamphlet form."

Gaer's papers are held at the Charles E. Young Research Library, a collection that includes "manuscripts of books written or edited by Joseph Gaer, and includes typescripts with holograph corrections and corrected galley and page proofs."

== Works ==
Books

- The Legend called Meryon (1928)
- How the Great Religions Began (1929)
- Everybody's Weather (1944)
- The Lore of the Old Testament (1951)
- How the Great Religions Began (1956)
- Our Jewish Heritage (1957)
- The Jewish Bible for Family Reading (1957)
- The Unconquered: Jewish Folklore for Children (1958)
- The Legend of the Wandering Jew (1961)
- What the Great Religions Believe (1963)
- The Lore of the New Testament (1966)

CIO Pamphlets

- People's plan for reconversion (1944)
- When a worker needs a friend (1944)
- Bretton Woods is no mystery (1945)
- Answer is full employment (1945)
- People's program for 1946 (1946)
- Remember in November (1946)

== See also ==
- Harry Dexter White
- Harold Ware
- Boni & Liveright
