= Thế Giới Publishers =

Vietnam's official foreign-language publishing house

- Status: Active
- Predecessor: Foreign Languages Publishing House (Hanoi)
- Founded: 1957
- Country of origin: Vietnam
- Headquarters location: Hanoi
- Official website: thegioipublishers.vn

Thế Giới Publishers (Vietnamese: Nhà xuất bản Thế Giới, literally "World Publishers") is Vietnam's official foreign language publishing house.

== Company history ==
The publishing house was established in 1957 "to introduce readers around the world to Vietnam" through publications in English, French and other foreign languages. From 1957 to 1992 it was known as the Foreign Languages Publishing House and also as the Editions en Langues Etrangères (Nhà xuất bản ngoại văn).

It also now publishes bilingual books and books in Vietnamese and publishes Vietnam Cultural Window an English language bi-monthly illustrated magazine, as well as a quarterly academic journal, Vietnamese Studies and its French version, Etudes Vietnamiennes.

Thế Giới also offers consultancy services using its experience in translation and publishing for cooperative ventures in the book industry, printing and translation.

== Subject specialities ==
Thế Giới publications cover a wide range of topics:

- General information about Vietnam: geography, history, ethnic groups, religion, etc.
- Politics and current events
- Socio-economic life
- Culture and tourism
- Literature and the arts
- Science and technology
- Warfare
- Notable people
- Dictionaries and reference books
- Teaching and learning Vietnamese

== Book series ==
=== Under Foreign Languages Publishing House imprint ===
- Hibiscus Series

=== Under Editions en Langues Etrangères imprint ===
- Fleuve rouge (English, "Red River")
- Hibiscus Collection

=== Under The Gioi imprint ===
- Frequently Asked Questions About Vietnamese Culture
- The Many Faces of Vietnam
- Memoirs of War Series
- Tủ sách gương mặt Việt Nam (English, "Faces of Vietnam Bookshelf")
- Tủ sách Việt Nam: Viện Viễn Đông Bác Cổ / Bibliothèque Vietnamienne: École francaise d'Extrême-Orient
- Vietnamese Tales and Legends Series
- Visages du Vietnam (English, "Faces of Vietnam")

== See also ==
- Foreign Languages Publishing House (Soviet Union), Moscow - similar publisher in Soviet Union
- Foreign Languages Press, Beijing – similar publisher in China
- Foreign Languages Publishing House, Pyongyang – similar publisher in North Korea
