= David Gelperin =

Software tester

David Gelperin is an American software tester who chaired the working groups developing the IEEE 829-1989 software testing documentation standard. With Jerry E. Durant he went on to develop the High Impact Inspection Technology that builds upon traditional inspections but utilizes a test driven additive.

Gelperin received his PhD in computer science from Ohio State University. Together with his partner William C. Hetzel, he co-founded the Software Quality Engineering consultancy firm (now known as TechWell Corporation) in 1986. The firm played a leading role in organizing the International Conference on Software Testing and the Software Testing Analysis & Review conference. Gelperin and Hetzel had developed the STEP methodology for implementing the original IEEE-829 Standard for Test Documentation. Their firm was instrumental in gaining recognition for testing as a separate discipline within the software industry.

He is CTO & President of ClearSpecs Enterprises in Minneapolis, Minnesota.
