= Edineț =

- Municipality
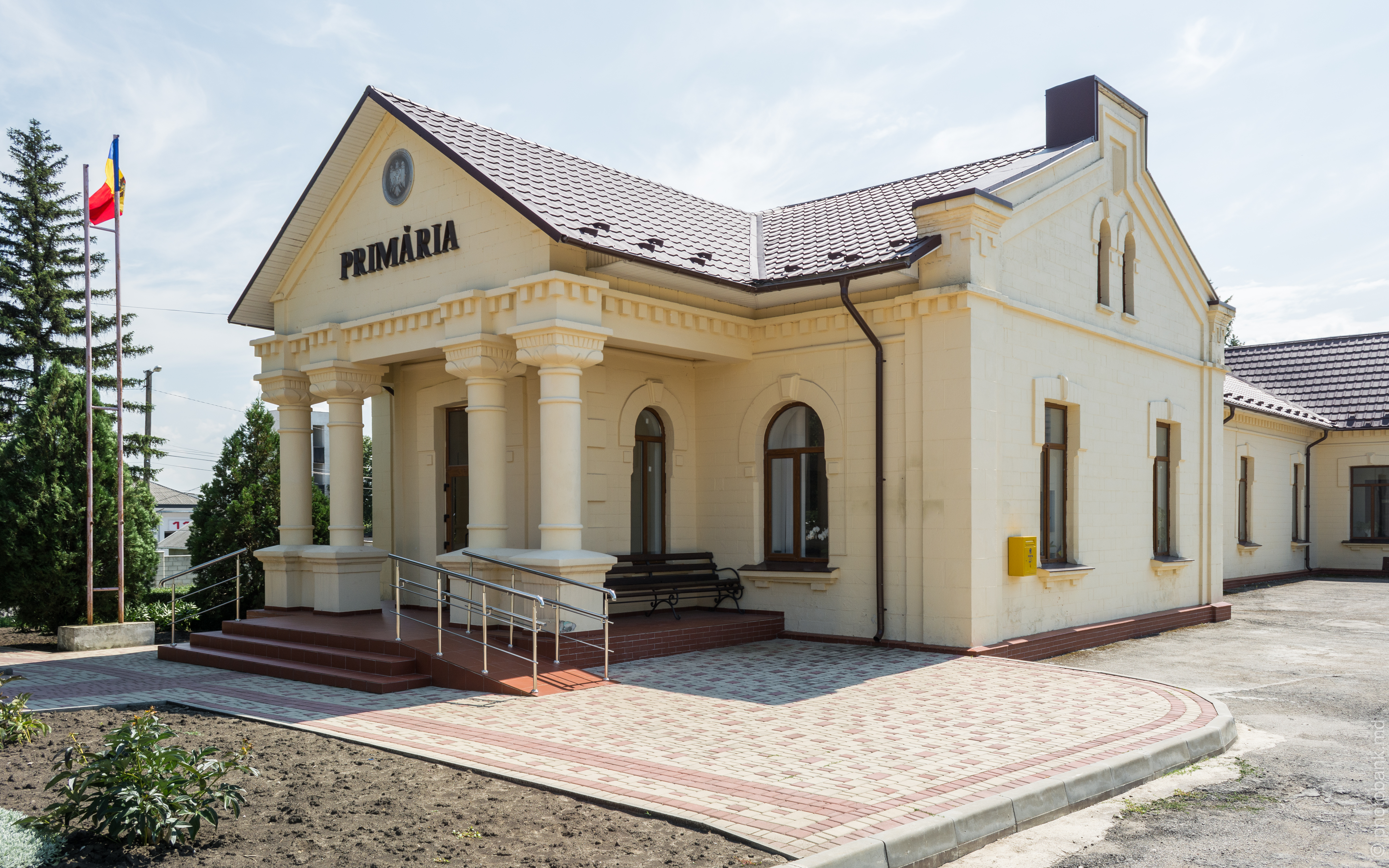
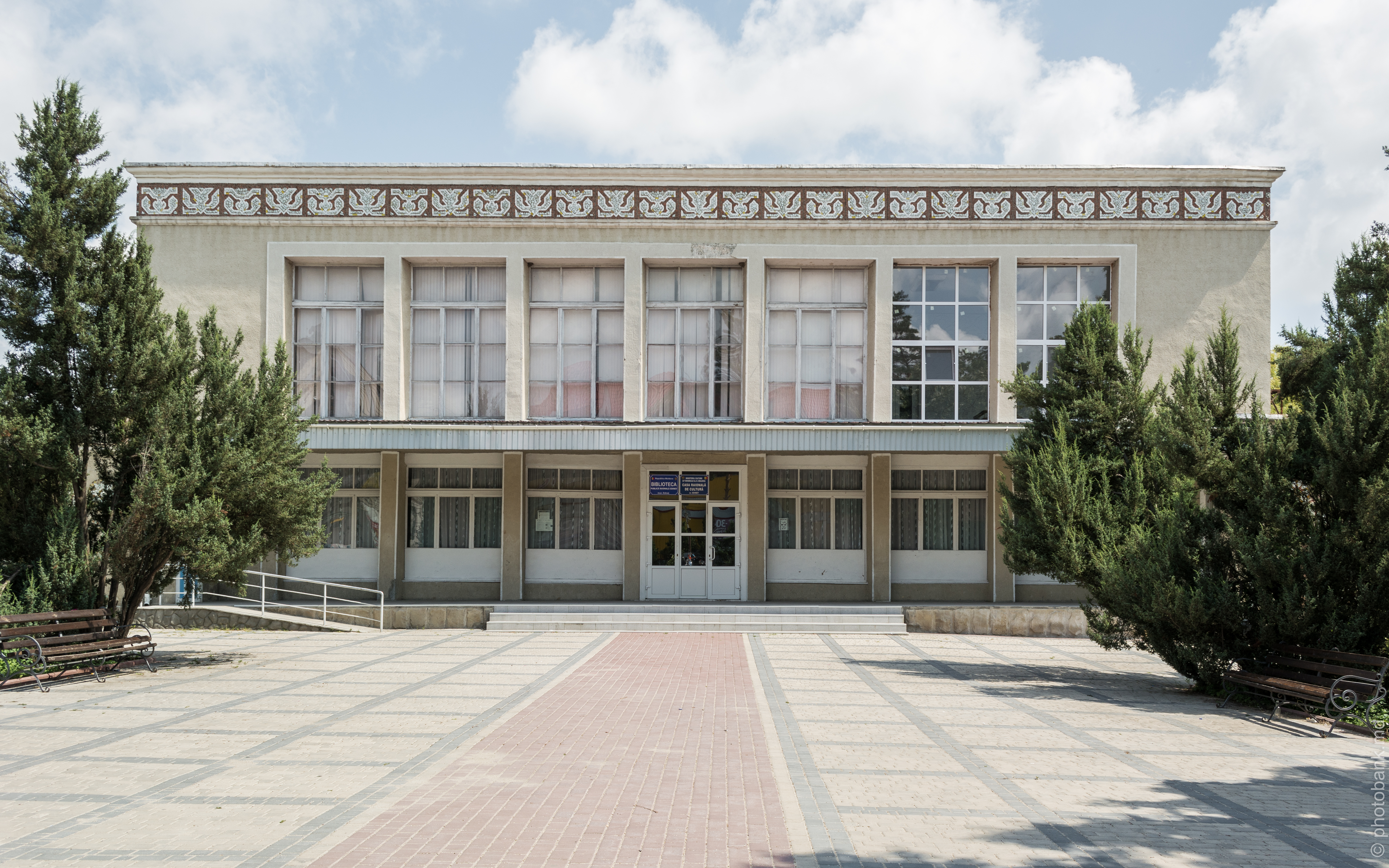
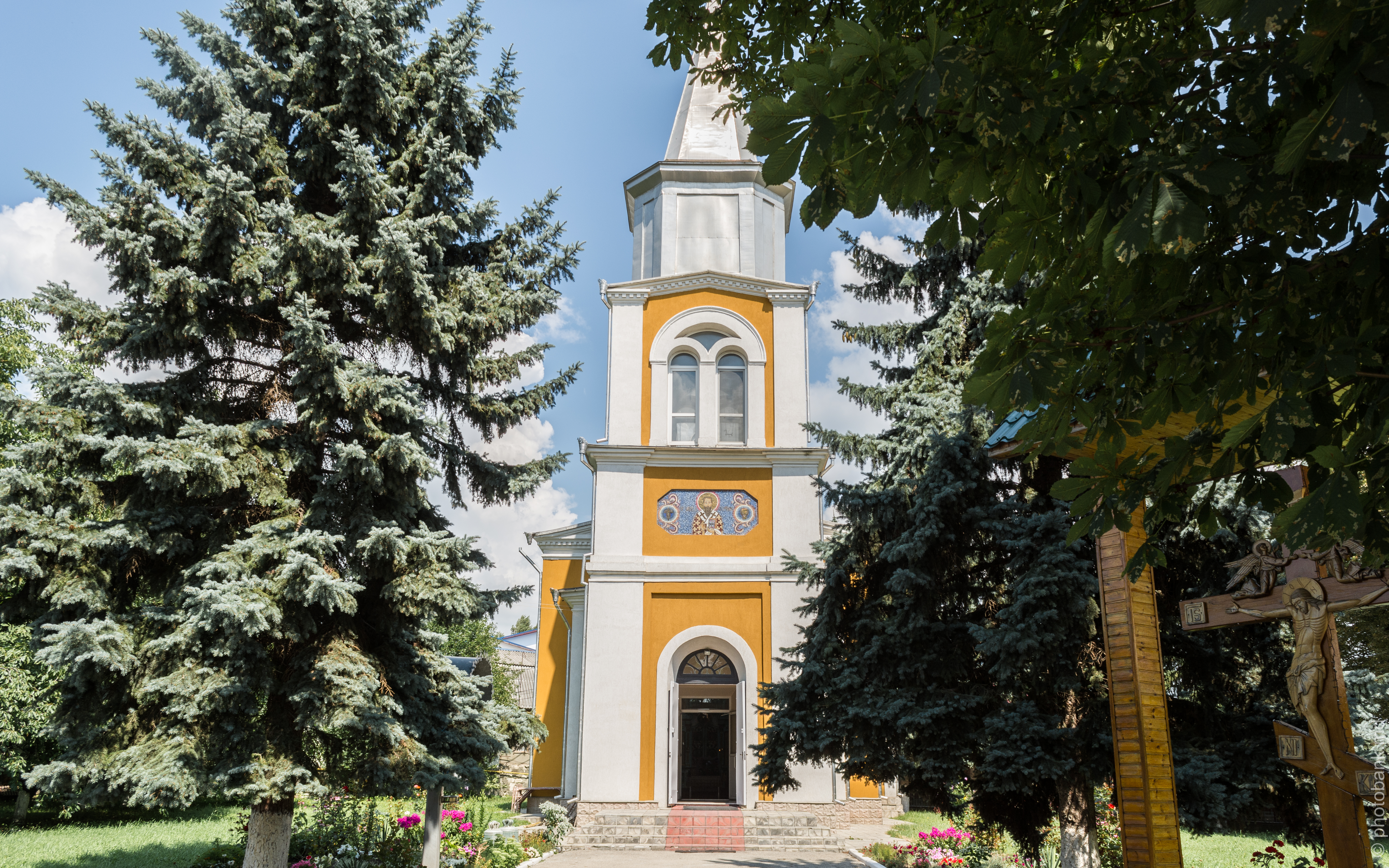
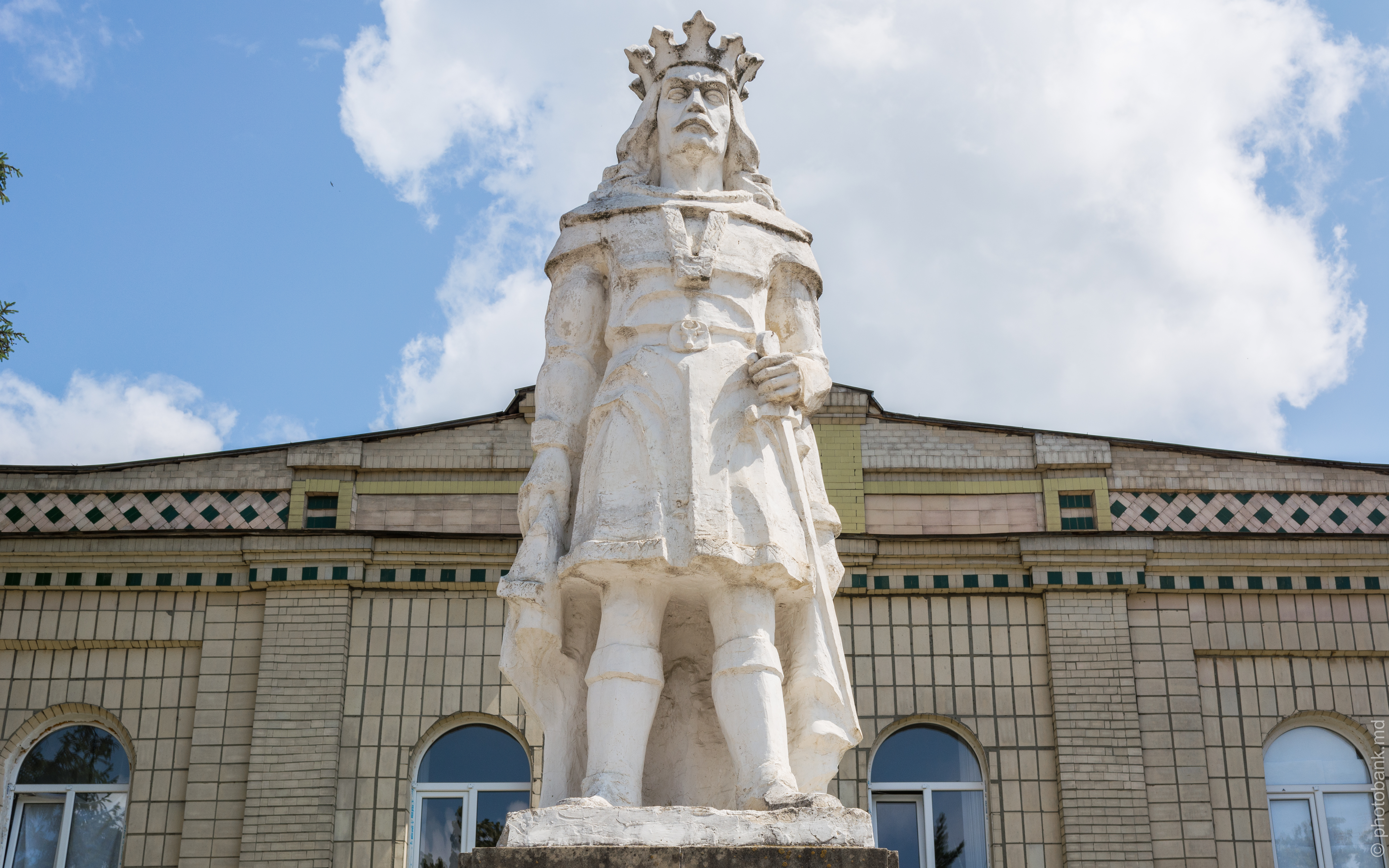
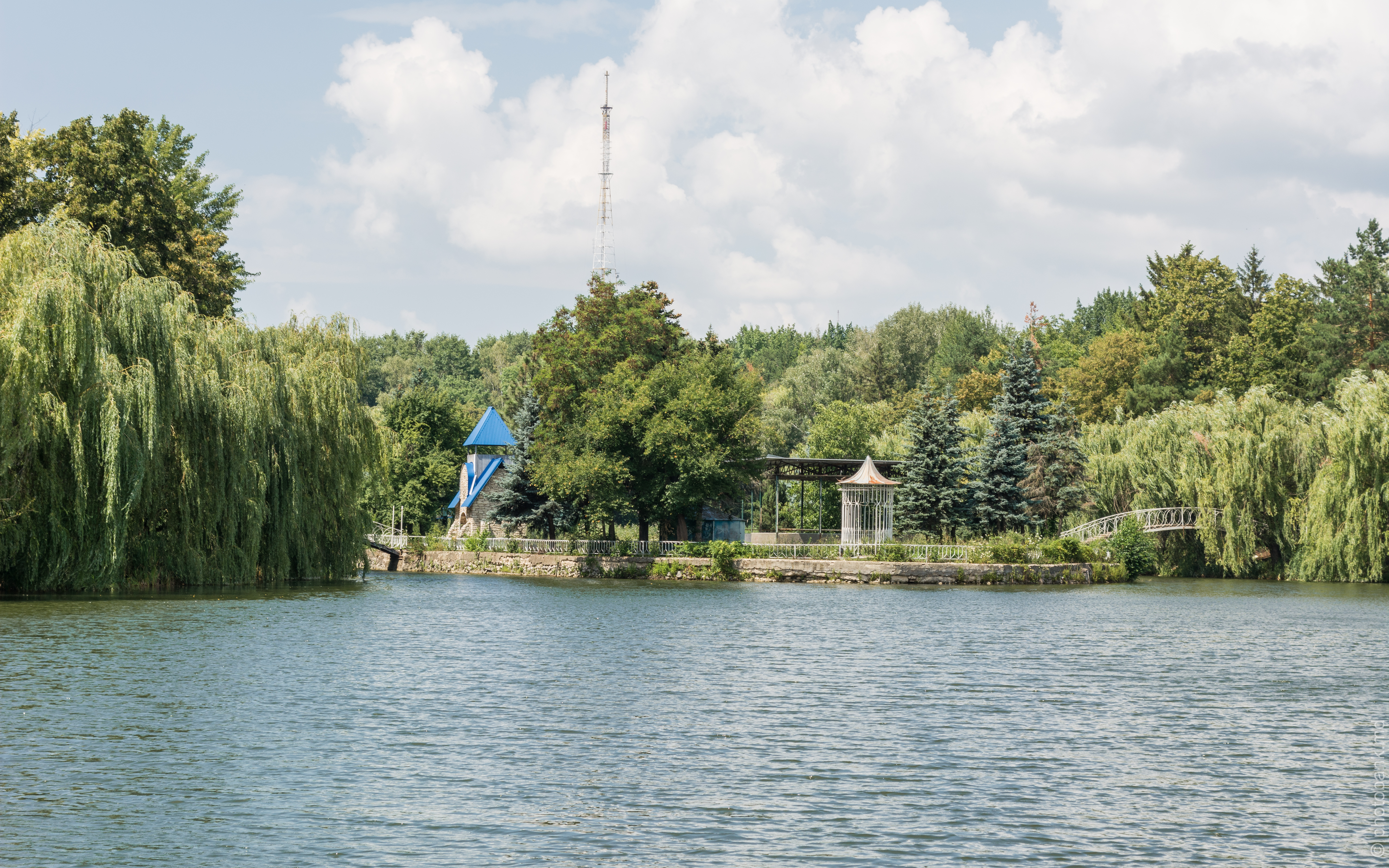
- Town Hall House of Culture St. Basil's Church Stephen the Great monument Park

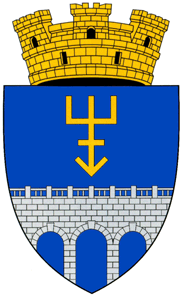
- Flag Coat of arms

- Location in Moldova
- Coordinates: 48°10′N 27°19′E
- Country: Moldova
- District: Edineț District
- Established: 1431

Government
  - Mayor: Constantin Cojocari (LOC)

Area
  - Total: 2.2 sq mi (5.7 km^{2})
- Elevation: 758 ft (231 m)

Population (2014)
  - Total: 15,520
  - Density: 7,100/sq mi (2,700/km^{2})
- Time zone: UTC+2 (EET)
  - Summer (DST): UTC+3 (EEST)
- Postal code: MD-4601
- Area code: +373 246
- Climate: Dfb

Edineț (Romanian pronunciation: [ˈedinet͡s]) is a municipality in northern Moldova. It is the administrative center of the eponymous district. The town is located 201 km north of the national capital, Chișinău. It is located at 48°10′N 27°19′E. The town administers two suburban villages, Alexăndreni and Gordineștii Noi. The population at the 2004 census was 17,292 inhabitants, including 15,624 in the town itself.

To the north of the town is the commune Hlinaia (Glina-Mare); to the south, the town of Cupcini; to the east, the commune of Ruseni; and to the west, the suburb of Alexăndreni.

== History ==
The first known written mention of the locality is in a document from July 15, 1431, in which the Prince of Moldavia Alexandru cel Bun offered to Ivan Cupcici "14 villages with their old domains and empty land to found new villages and an apiary". According to the document, the old name of Edineț was Viadineți, possibly meaning "little Viadins". A document dating August 18, 1690, given by Prince Constantin Movilă to Cozma Pop, mentions the village as Iadineți. The name Edineț is documented since 1663, and is still used today. Between 1918–1940, the alternative spellings Edineți and Edinița were sometimes used.

In 1812, the eastern part of Moldavia was annexed by the Russian Empire and became known as Governorate of Bessarabia.

In 1897, it had a population of 10,211, of whom 7,379 (72 percent) were Jewish.

Bessarabia proclaimed independence in January 1918 as the Moldavian Democratic Republic. In April 1918, Bessarabia proclaimed union with Romania, this came as a result of the World War I.

Later on, close to the World War II, this territory was then incorporated into the Soviet Union.

It became independent from the Soviet Union in 1991.

At the 1930 census, there were three separately administered localities: Edineți-Târg (literally "Edineți-Fair"), population 5,910, Edineți-Sat ("Edineți-Village"), population 5,260, part of Plasa Briceni of the Hotin County, and Alexăndrenii-Noi, population 1,083, part of Plasa Rășcani of the Bălți County.

Between the two World Wars there was a Zionist Tarbut school in the town.

In 1940, the Soviet Union, with the consent of the Nazi Germany occupied Bessarabia, created the Moldavian SSR, closing privately owned businesses and religious schools.

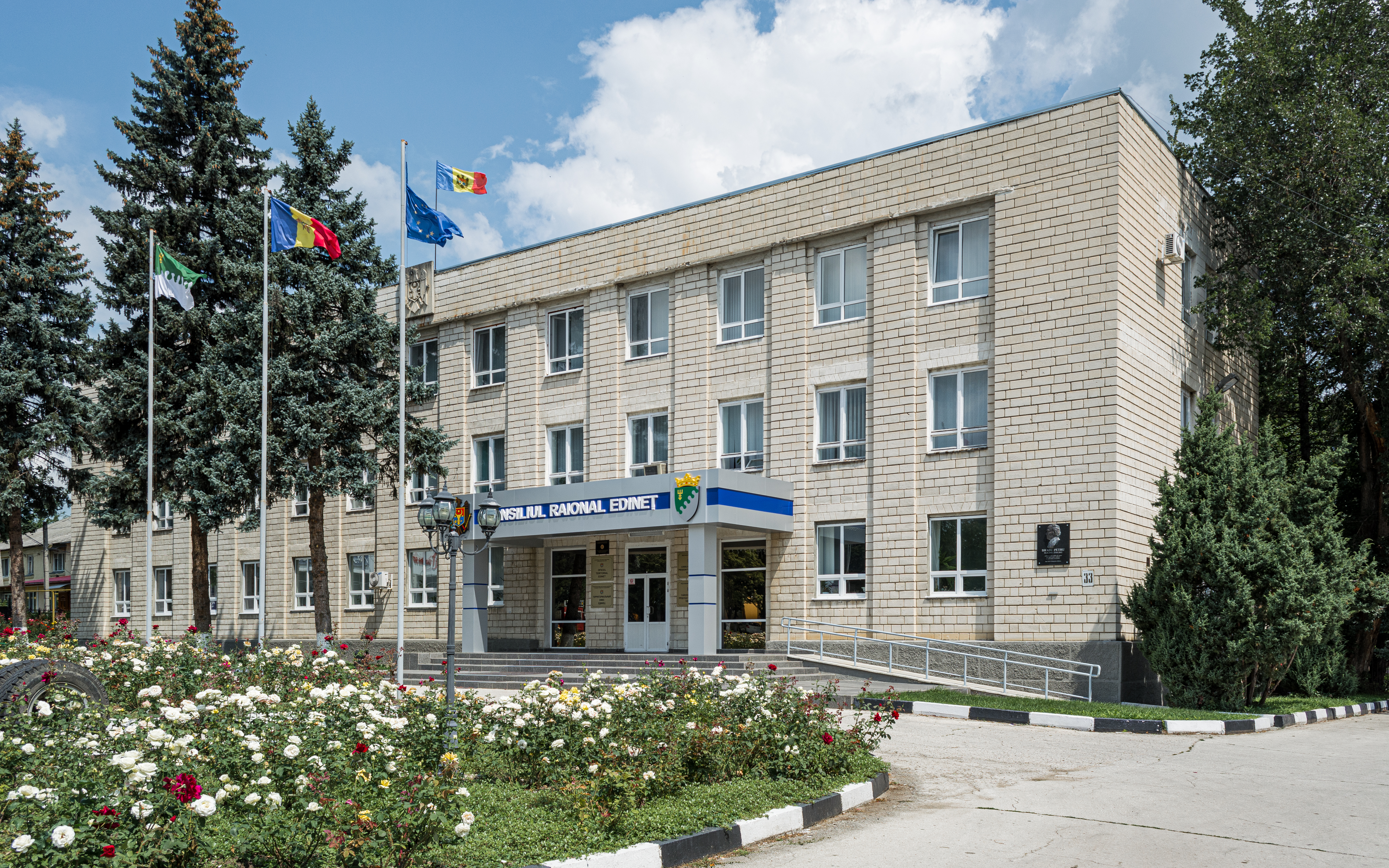
Seat of the District Council

A year later, the Romanian Army, now allied with Nazi Germany, drove the Soviets out and recovered Bessarabia.

In 1944, the Soviets re-conquered Bessarabia and re-established the Moldavian SSR. During the Soviet time, the town was also known in the Russified versions Yedintsy and Yedintzi and in Yiddish as Yedinets or Eydinets.

In 1960s, the Jewish population was estimated at 200. There was no synagogue, although the Jewish cemetery still existed.

Following the dissolution of the Soviet Union in 1991, Moldova became an independent country.

== Jews and the Holocaust ==
There were free-loan organizations, organizations to help the poor (e.g, by distributing food), a home for the elderly, and a medical organization prior to World War Two. There were also kindergartens and other Jewish schools, Jewish sports groups, theater groups, and a public library. Zionist groups active in the town included Poale Zion, Tze'irei Zion, the Gordonia movement, et cetera. In 1918, there was a pogrom.

German and Romanian troops entered Edineț on July 5, 1941. Before that, some of the Bessarabian Jews of Edineț had already fled. Within two days, several hundred Jews were murdered by units of Einsatzkommando D and Romanian gendarmes, assisted by some civilians. Within the first two weeks, Romanian soldiers had killed about 1,000 Jews out of 5,000 living in the town. Many women and young girls were raped; some of them committed suicide. The victims were buried in three large ditches, then the Jewish gravediggers who had interred the bodies were in turn murdered and buried on the same spot. In the middle of August a ghetto was set up. Surviving Jews of Edineț, and others from different places in the north of Bessarabia and from Bukovina, were interned there. In September there were about 12,000 Jews in the ghetto, crammed into a small area, suffering from malnutrition and disease. Dozens of people died every day, succumbing to disease, cold weather, hunger, or thirst. On September 16, 1941, all the remaining Jews were deported to Transnistria, where the overwhelming majority of them died. By 1944 only a few managed to survive. The few dozen families still alive at the end of the war settled either in Czernovitz or moved to Israel. Only a handful chose to return to Edineț.

== Culture ==
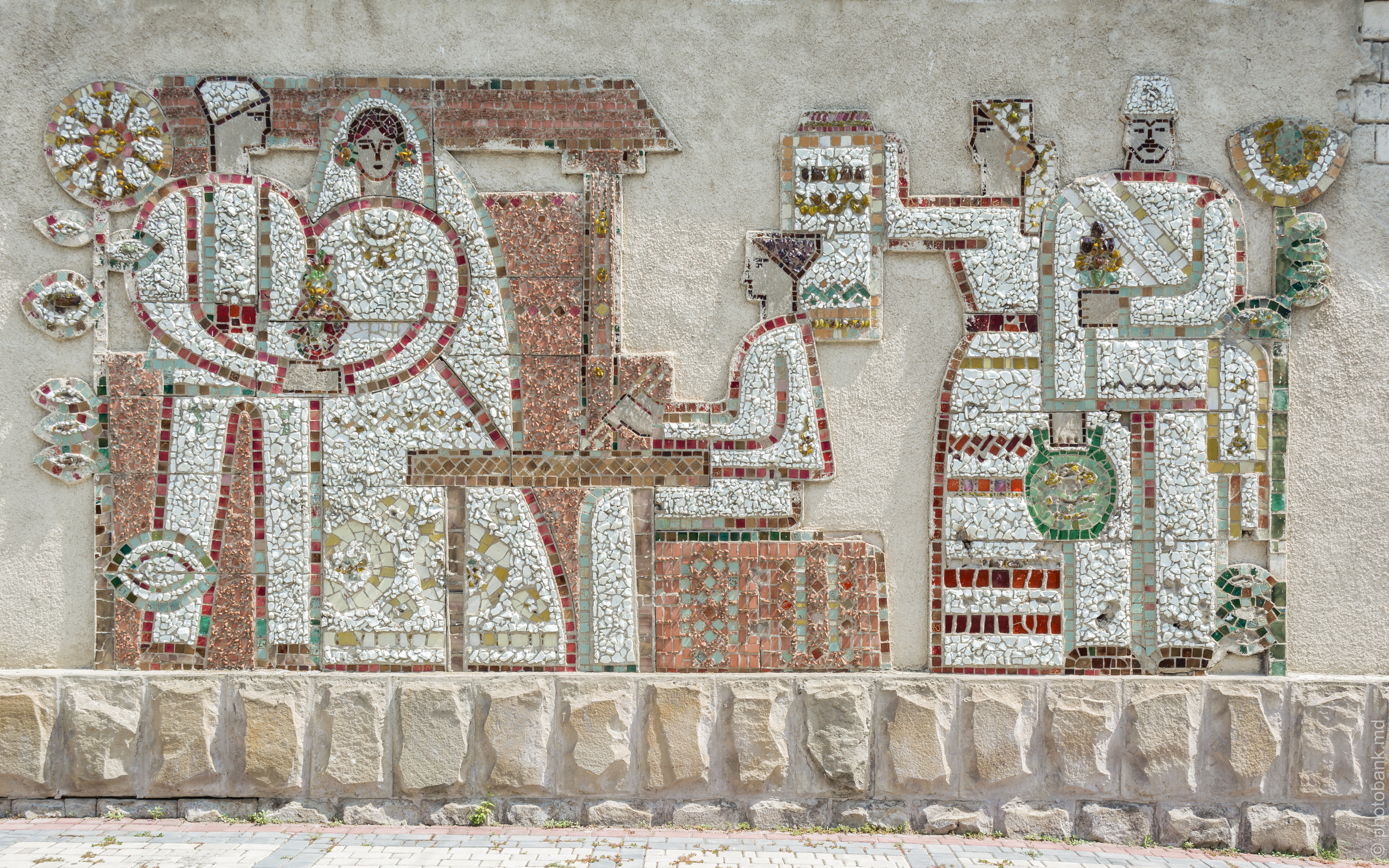
Edinet House of Culture

Edineț has a Natural History Museum, and a famous Museum of National Craftsmen, whose collection has many original folk objects and works.

== Demographics ==
According to the 2024 census, 12,369 inhabitants lived in Edineț, a decrease compared to the previous census in 2014, when 15,520 inhabitants were registered.

Ethnic composition of Edineț (2024)
1. Moldovans (Note: There is an ongoing controversy regarding the ethnic identification of Moldovans and Romanians.) (69.6%)
2. Romanians (4.20%)
3. Russians (10.7%)
4. Ukrainians (9.70%)
5. Romani (4.90%)
6. Others (0.80%)
Linguistic composition of Edineț (2024)
1. Moldovan (Note: In March 2023, the Parliament of Moldova passed a law updating all legislative texts and the constitution to refer to the national language as Romanian, effectively rendering the term "Moldovan" obsolete.) (42.7%)
2. Romanian (21.0%)
3. Russian (26.0%)
4. Ukrainian (5.10%)
5. Romani (4.90%)
6. Other (0.20%)

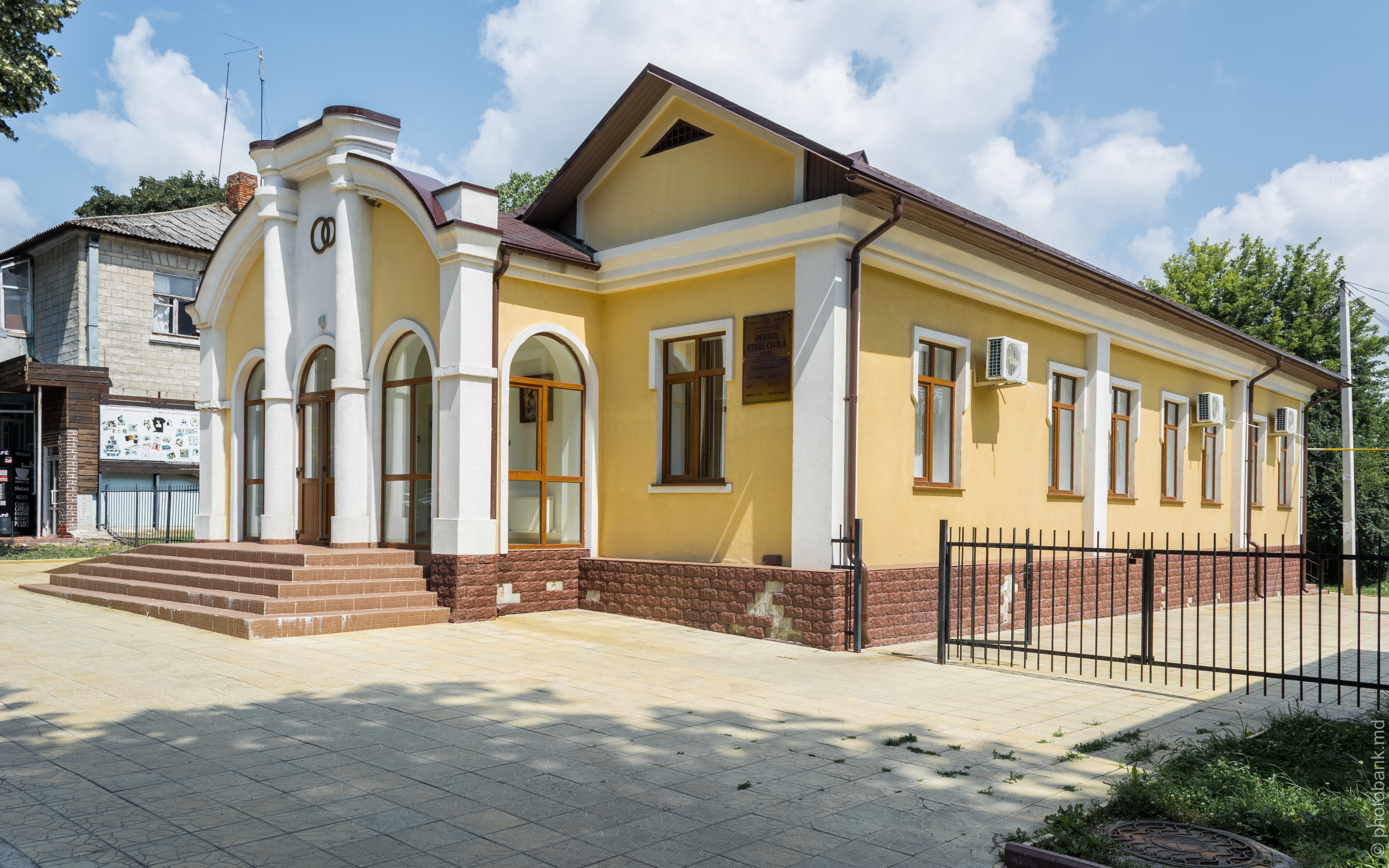
Civil Registration Office

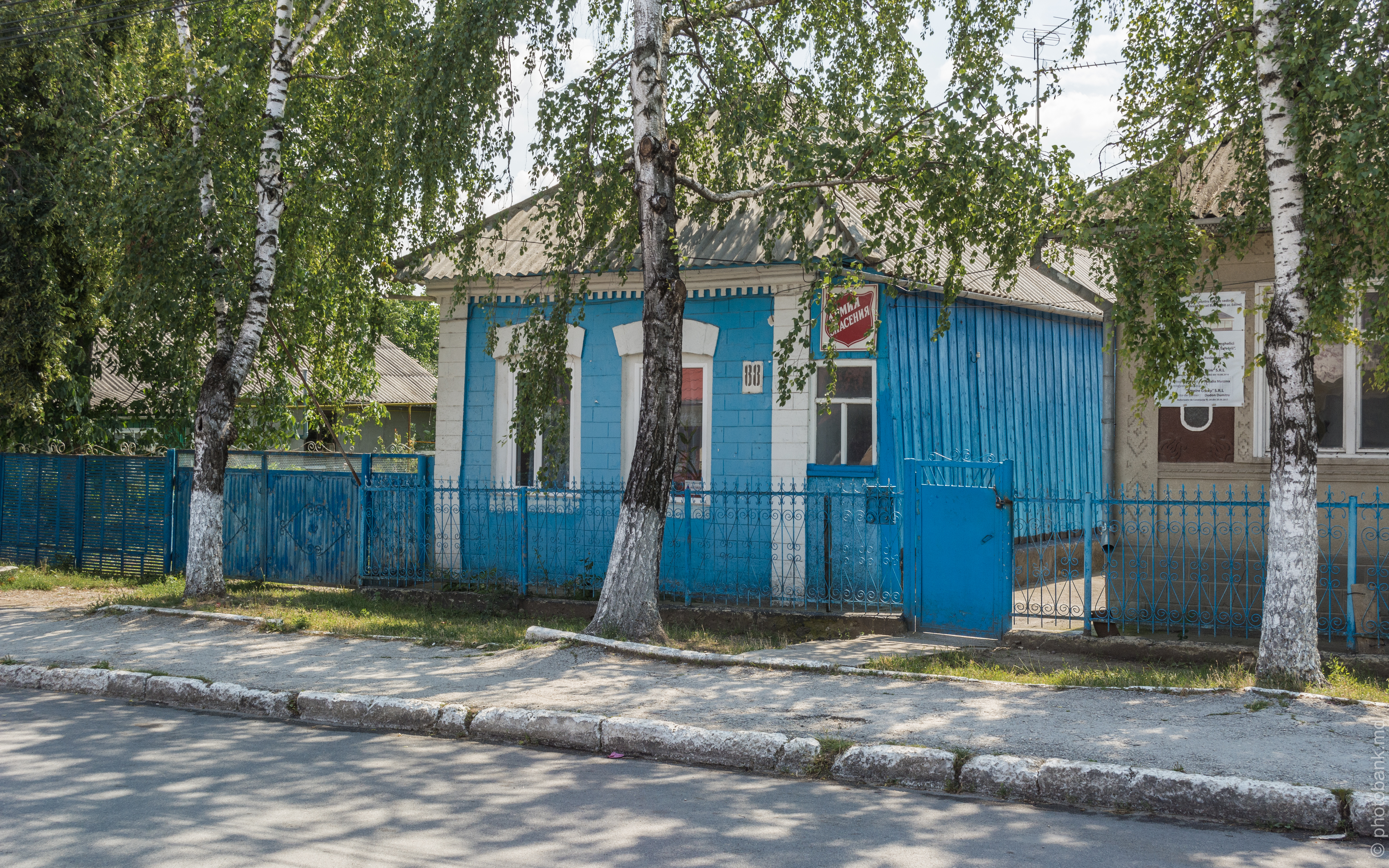
Salvation Army Church

=== Historical demographics ===
Ethnic composition (1930 Census)
Ethnic group
Ethnic group	Edineți-Târg	Edineți-Sat	Alexăndrenii-Noi
Romanians	194	2,183	1,082
Jews	5,341	398	–
Russians	344	2,214	1
Ruthenians (Ukrainians)	14	353	–
Romani	–	55	–
Bulgarians	1	1	–
Poles	14	28	–
Germans	–	3	–
Albanians	1	–	–
Hungarians	–	1	–
others	1	24	–
Total	5,910	5,260	1,083

Linguistic composition (1930 Census)
Language
Language	Edineți-Târg	Edineți-Sat	Alexăndrenii-Noi
Romanian	183	2,209	1,082
Yiddish	5,328	401	–
Russian	375	2,360	1
Ukrainian	9	282	–
Polish	11	7	–
German	2	1	–
Bulgarian	1	–	–
other	1	–	–
Total	5,910	5,260	1,083

== Media ==
- Radio Chișinău 104.6 FM
- Jurnal FM 107.9 MHz
- Radio Sanatatea

== Notable people ==
- Ghenadie Ciobanu
- Joseph Gaer
- Revekka Galperina
- Samuel Wainer

== International relations ==
=== Twin towns – sister cities ===
Edineț is twinned with:

- Râmnicu Sărat, Romania
