= Revekka Galperina =

Soviet editor and translator

Revekka Menasievna Galperina (Russian: Ревекка Менасьевна Гальперина; August 25, 1894 – November 2, 1974) was a Soviet editor and translator of English and German literature, one of the most prolific translators in the Soviet Union.

== Biography ==
Revekka Galperina was born in 1894 in Edineț, then part of the Russian Empire and now Moldova. Her parents were the Jewish writer and merchant Menashe Galperin (1871–1960) and Tema Naftulovna Kormanskaia (1872–1941). Galperina's maternal grandfather was a Bessarabian grain merchant and her paternal grandfather was an industrialist from Khmelnytskyi in what is today Ukraine.

Galperina was educated at home by private tutors, and her family moved frequently throughout her youth. She eventually settled in Moscow, where she worked as an editor at the state-run Foreign Languages Publishing House.

One of the most prolific Soviet translators, Galperina produced dozens of Russian translations of famous literary works. Her translations were popular among readers and were frequently reprinted, some as many as 50 times. Though she primarily translated from English and German, she spoke as many as twelve languages. Authors translated by Galperina include James Fenimore Cooper, Theodore Dreiser, Hans Fallada, Lion Feuchtwanger, Franz Fühmann, O. Henry, E. T. A. Hofmann, Franz Kafka, Sinclair Lewis, Jack London, Heinrich Mann, Thomas Mann, Dieter Noll, Hans Erich Nossack, Edgar Allan Poe, Anna Seghers, Robert Sheckley, Adalbert Stifter, William Makepeace Thackeray, Mark Twain, and Stefan Zweig.

Galperia was married twice. Her first husband was Pawel Nikolajewitsch Mostowenko (1881–1938), who served as rector of Bauman Moscow State Technical University from 1927 to 1930, was executed in 1938 during the purges and was rehabilitated in 1955. They had two children: Aleksandr Mostovenko (1921–1942), who died on the front during World War II, and Natalia Mostovenko. Her second husband was musicologist Georgy Nikitich Khubov (1902–1981), an Honoured Cultural Worker of the RSFSR, with whom she had a son, Nikita Georgievich Khubov, in 1936.
