= Heilbronn (disambiguation) =

Heilbronn is a city in Germany (not to be confused with Heilsbronn).

Heilbronn may also refer to:

- Heilbronn (district), surrounding the city of Heilbronn, Germany
- FC Heilbronn, a German football club based in Heilbronn, Germany
- Hans Heilbronn (1908–1975), German-Jewish mathematician
  - Heilbronn Institute for Mathematical Research, University of Bristol, England
- Johann Faber of Heilbronn (1504–1558), controversial German Catholic preacher
- Joseph ben Elhanan Heilbronn (fl. 16th century), German Hebrew scholar

== See also ==
- Heilbron, Free State province of South Africa
- Heilbronn League, an alliance during the Thirty Years' War
- Heilbronn triangle problem, a mathematical question in the area of irregularities of distribution
- Heilbronner, a surname
