= Joseph ben Elhanan Heilbronn =

Joseph ben Elhanan Heilbronn (Hebrew: יוסף בן אלחנן היילברון) was a German Hebrew scholar who lived in Posen, then in the Polish–Lithuanian Commonwealth, in the sixteenth century. He wrote: Em ha-Yeled, an elementary Hebrew grammar for the use of children, with conjugation tables and explanations in German (Prague, 1597); Me'irat 'Enayim, the 613 commandments arranged according to Maimonides (Prague, n.d.); and Ḳol ha-Ḳore, a short Hebrew grammar for use in schools (Cracow, n.d.).
