= Evsey Galperin =

Soviet seismologist and professor (1920–1990)

Evsey Iosifovich Galperin
- Galperin displaying his medals
- Born: 31 October 1920; Uman
- Died: 20 October 1990 (aged 69); Moscow
- Education: Russian State Geological Prospecting University
- Known for: Introducing the symmetric triaxial seismometer design known as the Galperin configuration
- Scientific career
- Fields: Seismology
- Workplaces: Schmidt Institute of Physics of the Earth

Evsey Iosifovich Galperin (October 31, 1920 - October 20, 1990) was a Soviet seismologist and professor at the Institute of Earth Physics of the USSR Academy of Sciences. He was inventor of the symmetric triaxial seismometer design, today known as the Galperin configuration.

== Life and scientific career ==
Evsey Galperin was born on 31 October 1920 in Uman (Ukraine, former USSR) as one of eight children in a Jewish family as the son of Anna Markovna and Joseph Iosifovich. The family moved to Moscow in 1934, where he studied at the Moscow Geological Exploration Institute from 1938 to 1949, specializing in geophysics.

In 1941, Galperin joined the Red Army in World War II and fought with the Orenburg Cossack cavalry regiment at the south western and Bryansk front. From 1942 to 1944, he was a cadet at the Leningrad topographic school. He was sent to the 2nd Ukrainian front with the rank of a junior lieutenant for photo-reconnaissance of the enemy's front line for which he was awarded with the Order of the Red Star in 1944. He was demobilized in September 1945 in Vienna.

After the war, Galperin finished his studies and started his scientific career as a junior laboratory assistant at the Institute of Earth Physics of the USSR Academy of Sciences, where he later pursued his doctoral studies and became professor. He married Rimma Mikailovna in 1962 with whom he had two children, Adam (born 1962) and Sasha (born 1963).

Galperin introduced the symmetric triaxial seismometer design, which became widely used in exploration geophysics and seismology. The design is commonly known as the “Galperin configuration”, named after its inventor. He also contributed significantly to the development of the Vertical Seismic Profiling (VSP) technique, which found little application outside the Soviet union before mid-1970s but became a standard method in exploration seismology worldwide.

Evsey Galperin became ill during the 1990 annual convention of the Society of Exploration Geophysicists (SEG) in San Francisco, California. He returned to Moscow and died less than a month later.

== Publications ==
- Galperin, E. I., 1955, Azimuthal method of seismic observations, Gostoptechizdat, Moscow, 80.
- Galperin, E. I., 1974, Vertical Seismic Profiling. Special Publications, Society of Exploration Geophysicists, 12, Tulsa
- Galperin, E. I., 1984, The Polarization Method of Seismic Exploration. Solid Earth Sciences Library, Springer, doi: 10.1007/978-94-009-7091-5
- Galperin, E. I., and Kennett, Peter. 1985, Vertical Seismic Profiling and Its Exploration Potential. Modern Approaches in Geophysics, 1, Springer, doi: 10.1007/978-94-009-5195-2
- Galperin, E. I., Nersesov, I. L., and Galperina, R. M., 1986, Borehole Seismology and the Study of the Seismic Regime of Large Industrial Centres. Modern Approaches in Geophysics, 2, Springer, doi: 10.1007/978-94-009-4510-4
