= Galperin configuration =

Particular configuration of sensing elements found in a class of seismic instruments

Galperin configuration are a particular configuration of sensing elements found in a class of seismic instruments measuring ground motion and are named after Soviet seisomologist Evsey Iosifovich Galperin, who introduced it in 1955 for petroleum exploration.

== Description ==
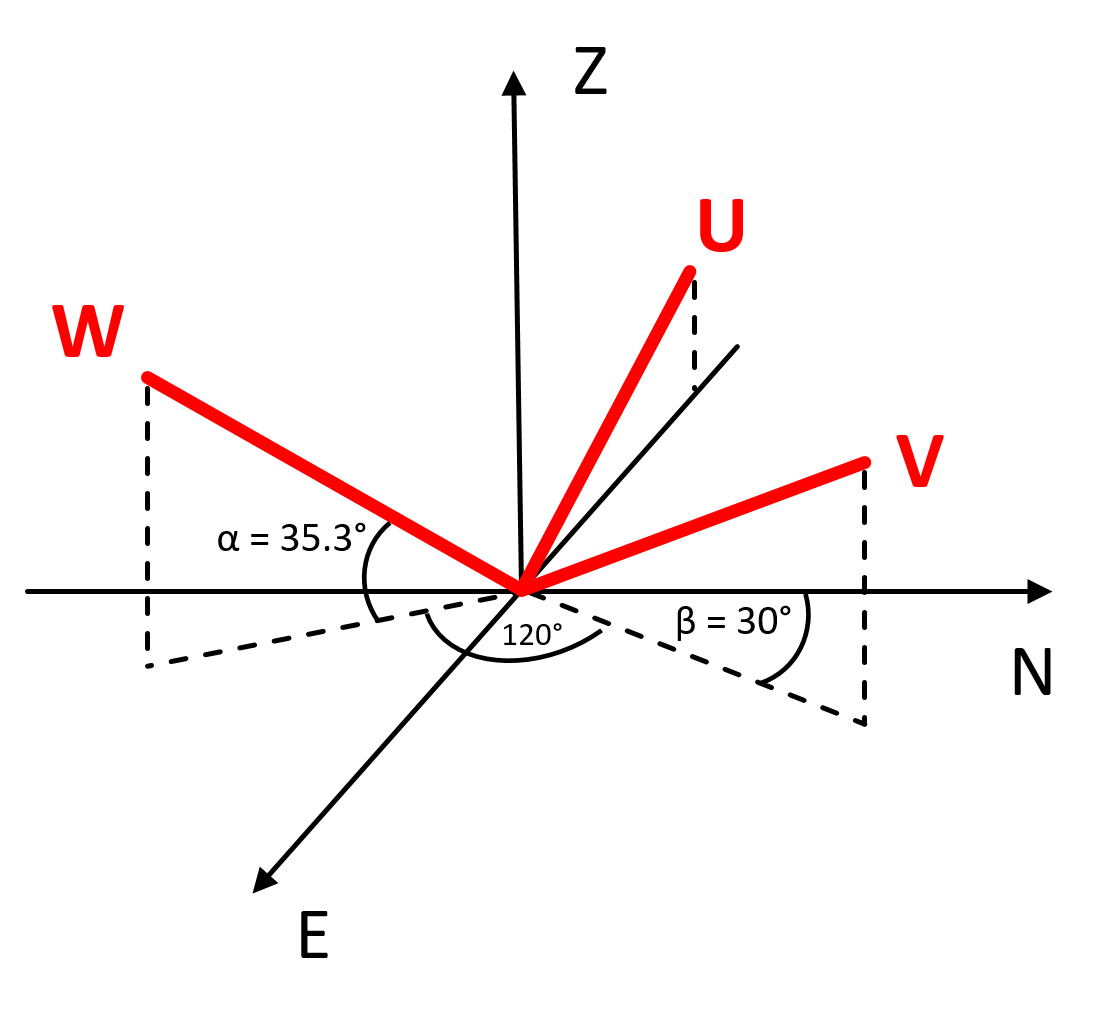
Geometry of the Galperin configuration: three orthogonal vectors (U, V, W) are rotated to the Cartesian coordinate system (E, N, Z).

Common triaxial seismometers provide signal outputs in three orthogonal axes oriented towards east–west (E), north–south (N) and up-down (Z), i.e. in the Cartesian coordinate system. In contrast, the Galperin configuration consists of three orthogonal axes (U, V, W) that are oriented at precisely the same angle with respect to the horizontal plane (α=35.26°). The projection of all three axes onto the horizontal plane are all separated by 120°, which results in the "symmetric triaxial" design. The recordings acquired with the Galperin configuration are brought to the Cartesian coordinate system by the following coordinate transformation, where β=30°:

$$\begin{bmatrix} E \\ N  \\ Z \end{bmatrix}
=
\begin{bmatrix} -\cos\alpha & \cos\alpha\sin\beta & \cos\alpha\sin\beta \\  0 & \cos\alpha\cos\beta & -\cos\alpha\cos\beta \\ \sin\alpha & \sin\alpha & \sin\alpha \end{bmatrix}
\begin{bmatrix} U\\V\\W \end{bmatrix}$$

A main advantage of the Galperin configuration is that all three receivers have identical orientation with respect to the vertical axis and, thus have identical instrument responses. Another advantage is the ability to build smaller packages (i.e., instruments) compared to the Cartesian orientation, which makes the Galperin configuration especially applicable for borehole installations. Other benefits of the Galperin configuration include easier distinction between external and internal noise sources and the fact that the configuration is not sensitive to rotation around the vertical axis. However, the main drawback of the configuration is that all input vectors are linked by the rotational matrix, which causes failure of the entire system when one of the three sensor is malfunctioning. In the Cartesian configuration, for example, both horizontal components still provide useful data in case the vertical (Z) component fails.

The Galperin configuration found wide application in seismometer design, including models for borehole, ocean bottom, and vault installations. The Galperin configuration can also be applied at the source side to simulate three-component seismic sources
