= Peter L. Bernstein =

American academic

- Died: June 5, 2009; Manhattan, New York City, U.S.
- Occupations: Economic historian, author
- Writing career
- Notable works: Capital Ideas (1991); Against the Gods: The Remarkable Story of Risk (1996)

Peter Lewyn Bernstein (January 22, 1919 – June 5, 2009) was an American financial historian, economist and educator whose evangelizing of the efficient-market hypothesis to the public made him one of the country's best known popularizers of academic finance.

== Education and military service during World War II ==
A native of New York City, Peter Bernstein was the son of financial consultant Allen Bernstein and his wife, Irma Lewyn. His primary education was at the Ethical Culture School where, in first grade, he became a lifelong friend of another economics historian, Robert Heilbroner, with whom he later attended Horace Mann School and Harvard College, from which both received, in 1940, bachelor's degrees in economics. Following Harvard, where he was elected to Phi Beta Kappa and graduated magna cum laude, came service as a member of the research staff at the Federal Reserve Bank of New York and, in a civilian capacity, at the Office of Strategic Services in Washington. In the aftermath of the December 7, 1941 Pearl Harbor attack, he joined the Air Force and rose to the rank of captain, assigned to the Office of Strategic Services in the European theater.

== As investment manager ==
In 1951, after teaching economics at Williams College and a five-year stint in commercial banking, Bernstein took over, at family insistence, the management of his late father's wealth management firm, Bernstein-Macaulay Inc., where he personally managed billions of dollars of individual and institutional portfolios. The assets under his management had grown more than tenfold by the time the firm was sold in 1967 and he resigned in 1973 to launch Peter L. Bernstein, Inc. and, a year later, to become the first editor of The Journal of Portfolio Management, a widely read scholarly financial publication for investment managers and academics. He continued as consulting editor of the Journal and served on the advisory panel of Robert D. Arnott's investment management firm, Research Affiliates.

== Career as educator and lecturer ==
Bernstein served for many years on the Visiting Committee to the Economics Department at Harvard University, as a Trustee and member of the Finance Committee of the College Retirement Equities Fund (CREF), and as a Trustee of the Investment Management Workshop sponsored by the Association for Investment Management & Research (AIMR), and had been lecturing widely throughout the United States and abroad on risk management, asset allocation, portfolio strategy, and market history.

A longtime resident of Manhattan, Peter Bernstein died in 2009, aged 90, from pneumonia at NewYork-Presbyterian/Weill Cornell Hospital, after having broken a hip. His first wife, Shirley, died in 1971 and he was survived by his second wife, Barbara, whom he married in 1972.

== Works ==
Bernstein was the author of ten books in economics and finance as well as countless articles in professional journals such as Harvard Business Review, Financial Analysts Journal and, in the popular press, The New York Times, The Wall Street Journal, Worth magazine and Bloomberg, among others, and has contributed to collections of articles published by Perseus and FT Mastering, among others.

Against The Gods: The Remarkable Story of Risk, was published by John Wiley & Sons in September 1996 and won the Edwin G. Booz Prize for the most insightful, innovative management book published in 1996. In 1998, it was awarded the Clarence Arthur Kulp/Elizur Wright Memorial Book Award from The American Risk and Insurance Association (ARIA) as an outstanding original contribution to the literature of risk and insurance. The book has sold over 500,000 copies worldwide. A review in Kirkus described it as a "dense but compelling model of how the world works". A review in the Regional Review of the Federal Reserve Bank of Boston wrote the book is about "the limits of rationality in explaining our choices". A 2010 review by Venkatesh Rao said the "book suffers from a major flaw that almost makes it worthless: it was first published in 1996, with a second printing in 1998. The infamous Black-Scholes-Mertens Long-Term Capital Management (LTCM) fiasco and 1998 bailout by Clinton didn't make it into the book... What saves the book is a general tone of rather old-fashioned caution".

In 1992 Capital Ideas: The Improbable Origins of Modern Wall Street was published by The Free Press in Canada and Maxwell Macmillan International in the US and has since become a worldwide guide to modern investment theories and practices. Capital Ideas Evolving, the follow-up to this seminal work, was published in May 2007 by John Wiley and Sons.

Streetwise: The Best of The Journal of Portfolio Management, edited by Peter L. Bernstein and Frank J. Fabozzi, was published in 1997 by Princeton University Press.

Earlier books include A Primer on Money, Banking and Gold (Random House 1965), as well as Economist on Wall Street (Macmillan 1970), and The Price of Prosperity (Doubleday, 1962), in addition to two books on government finance co-authored with Robert Heilbroner.

Bernstein's other books are The Power of Gold: The History of an Obsession, published in the fall of 2000 by John Wiley and Sons, Wedding of the Waters: The Erie Canal and the Making of a Great Nation, published in 2005 by W.W. Norton & Co.

== Bibliography ==
- Bernstein, Peter L. (2007). Capital Ideas Evolving. Hoboken, NJ: John Wiley & Sons. ISBN 978-0-471-73173-3.
- Bernstein, Peter L. (2005). Special Real Estate Issue. New York: Institutional Investor Systems.
- Bernstein, Peter L. (2005). Wedding of the Waters: The Erie Canal and the Making of a Great Nation. New York: W.W. Norton & Co. ISBN 0-393-05233-8.
- Bernstein, Peter L. (2000). The Power of Gold: The History of an Obsession. New York: John Wiley & Sons. ISBN 0-471-25210-7.
- Bernstein, Peter L.; Aswath Damodaran (1998). Investment Management. New York: John Wiley & Sons. ISBN 0-471-19716-5.
- Bernstein, Peter L.; Frank J. Fabozzi (1997). Streetwise: The Best of The Journal of Portfolio Management. Princeton, NJ: Princeton University Press. ISBN 0-691-01129-X.
- Bernstein, Peter L. (1996). Against The Gods: The Remarkable Story of Risk. New York: John Wiley & Sons. ISBN 0-471-12104-5.
- Bernstein, Peter L. (1995). The Portable MBA in Investment. New York: John Wiley & Sons. ISBN 0-471-10661-5.
- Bernstein, Peter L. (1992). Capital Ideas: The Improbable Origins of Modern Wall Street. New York: Maxwell Macmillan International. ISBN 0-02-903011-0.
- Heilbroner, Robert L.; Peter L. Bernstein (1989). The Debt and the Deficit: False Alarms/Real Possibilities. New York: W.W. Norton & Co. ISBN 0-393-02752-X.
- Bernstein, Peter L. (1983). International Investing. New York: Institutional Investor Books.
- Bernstein, Peter L. (1978). Security Selection and Active Portfolio Management. New York: Institutional Investor Books.
- Bernstein, Peter L. (1977). The Theory and Practice of Bond Portfolio Management. New York: Institutional Investor Books.
- Bernstein, Peter L. (1977). Portfolio Management and Efficient Markets: Theoretical Relevance and Practical Applications. New York: Institutional Investor Books.
- Bernstein, Peter L. (1970). Economist on Wall Street: Notes on the Sanctity of Gold, the Value of Money, the Security of Investments, and Other Delusions. New York: Macmillan.
- Bernstein, Peter L. (1965). A Primer on Money, Banking, and Gold. New York: Random House.
- Heilbroner, Robert L.; Peter L. Bernstein (1963). A Primer on Government Spending. New York: Random House.
- Bernstein, Peter L. (1962). The Price of Prosperity: A Realistic Appraisal of the Future of our National Economy. Garden City, NY: Doubleday.

== Awards ==
Peter Bernstein received three major awards from the CFA Institute, the key organization for investment managers and analysts:

- The Award for Professional Excellence, AIMR's highest award,
- The Graham & Dodd Award, given annually for the outstanding article in the Financial Analysts Journal for the previous year, and
- The James R. Vertin Award, recognizing individuals who have produced a body of research notable for its relevance and enduring value to investment professionals.
