= Yefim Galperin =

American journalist

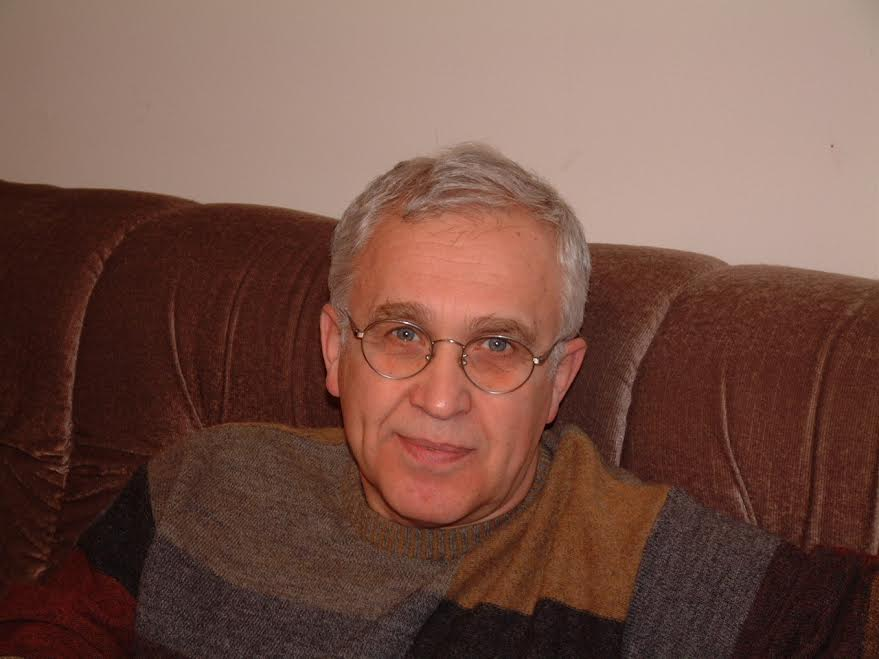
- Born: August 30, 1946 (age 80); Dnipropetrovsk, Ukraine
- Known for: Russian children's comedy TV show Yeralash

Yefim Mikhailovich Galperin (Russian: Ефим Михайлович Гальперин, Ukrainian: Юхим Михайлович Гальперін) (born August 30, 1946, in Dnipropetrovsk, Ukraine) is a Russian American producer, film director, scenarist, journalist, and writer. He is known for Russian-language films and documentaries as well as his contributions to the Russian children's comedy TV show Yeralash.

== Biography ==
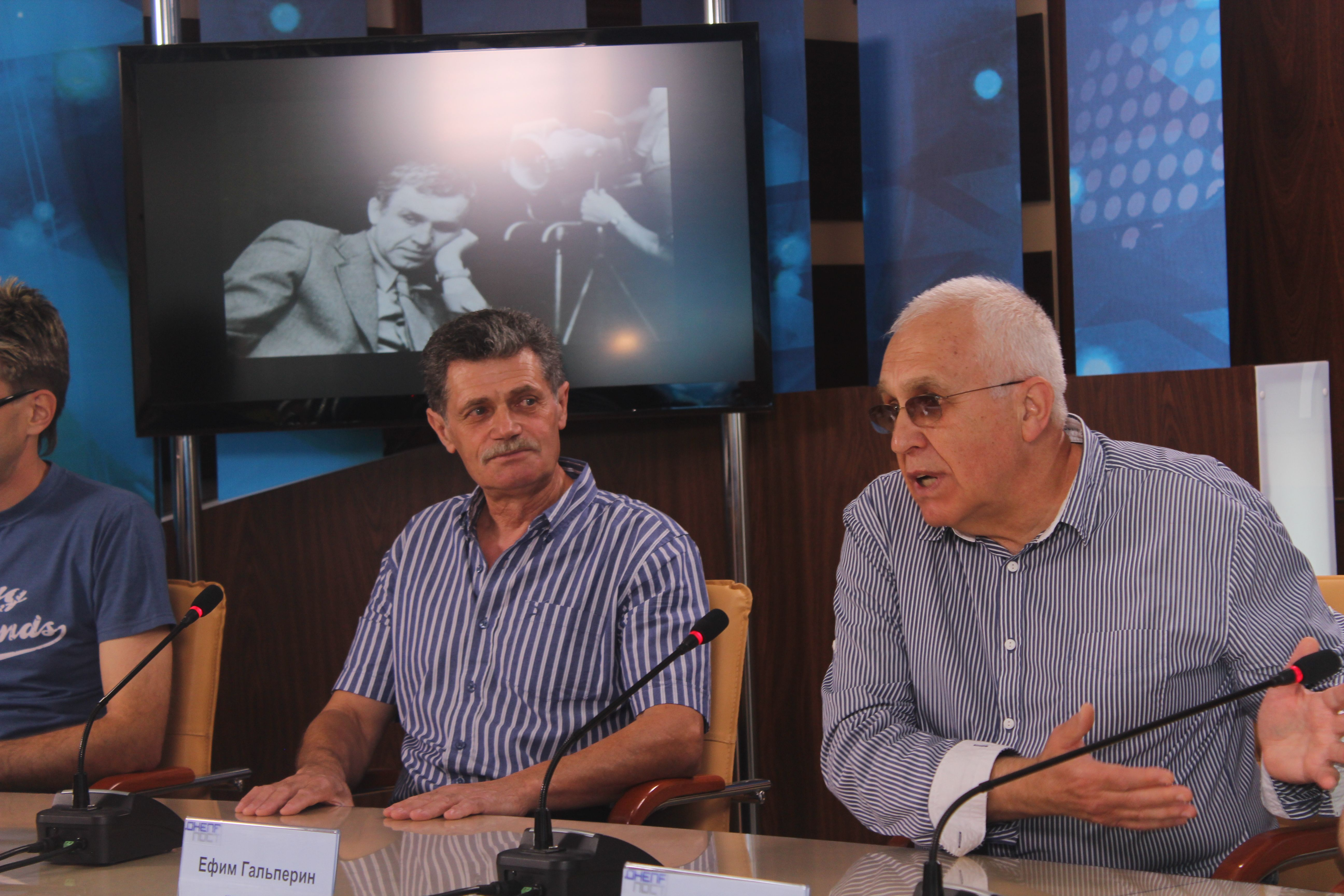
Galperin at press conference in Ukraine in 2014.

Galperin graduated from Dnipropetrovsk's National Mining University of Ukraine in 1970 as an engineer and later attended the National University of Theatre, Film and TV in Kiev, Ukraine. He graduated from there in 1979 as a film director.

Later he worked in the Dovzhenko Film Studios in Kiev, the Sverdlovsk Film Studio in Yekaterinberg, and the Gorky Film Studio in Moscow. Since 1992, Galperin has resided in the United States where he has anchored and produced content for the Russian-language television channel WMNB. Currently, he is a writer and journalist.

== Filmography ==
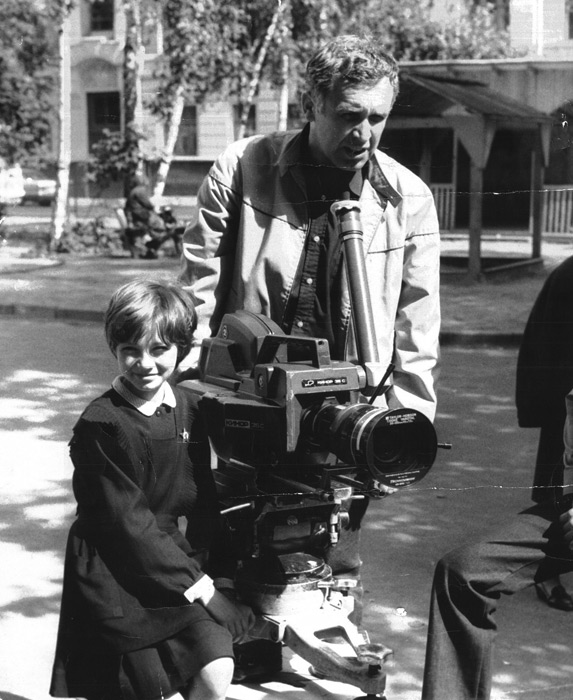
Galperin on the set of his film A House with Ghosts.

- Galka-Professor. Documentary. 1967. Scenarist and director. First prize at All-Union Festival of the U.S.S.R., various awards at International Film Festival in Belgrade, Yugoslavia.
- Caring. Documentary. 1970. Scenarist and director. Various awards at All-Union Film Festival of the U.S.S.R.
- Tomorrow. Documentary. 1977. Scenarist and director.
- Free Composition. Feature film. 1978. Scenarist and director.
- The Old Man. Feature film. 1979. Scenarist and director. Audience and jury prizes at International Youth Film Festival in Kiev.
- These Are the Miracles. Musical comedy. 1982. Director.
- Yeralash. Various short films. 1983–1987. Scenarist and director.
- A House With Ghosts. Feature film. 1988. Director. Grand Prix of the International Film Festival for Children in Argentina. Various awards at film festivals in Romania and Germany.
- Blya. Satirical comedy. 1990. Producer, co-scenarist, and director. Audience and jury prizes at All-Union Comedy Film Festival in Odessa.
- Rabbi. Documentary. 1996. Producer, scenarist, and film director.
- The Neighbor's Part in the Story. Documentary film. 1998. Scenarist and director.
- Nine Grams of Pure Silver. Documentary. 1999. Scenarist and director.
- Gariki and Humans. Documentary series. 2001. Producer, co-scenarist, and director.

== Bibliography ==
- Psychoanalytical Endeavors: Lunacy of a Scumbag. 2014. Author.
- Anomaly (Shpoler Zeyde). 2014. Author.
- Villa With a View on Vesuvius (Orphans). 2014. Author.
- Perpetual Flux 2022. Author.
- THESE 2023. Author.
