= William C. Hetzel =

Dr. William C. Hetzel is an expert in the field of software testing. He compiled the papers from the 1972 Computer Program Test Methods Symposium, also known as the Chapel Hill Symposium, into the book Program Test Methods. The book, published in 1973, details the problems of software validation and testing.

Hetzel and Dave Gelperin co-found the Software Quality Engineering consultancy firm in 1986. In 1988 they classified the phases and goals of software testing into the following stages:

- Until 1956 – Debugging Oriented – Until 1956 it was the debugging oriented period, when testing was often associated to debugging: there was no clear difference between testing and debugging.
- 1957–1978 – Demonstration Oriented – From 1957–1978 there was the demonstration oriented period where debugging and testing was distinguished now – in this period it was shown, that software satisfies the requirements.
- 1979–1982 – Destruction Oriented – The time between 1979–1982 is announced as the destruction oriented period, where the goal was to find errors.
- 1983–1987 – Evaluation Oriented – The years 1983–1987 are classified as the evaluation oriented period: intention here is that during the software lifecycle a product evaluation is provided and measuring quality.
- 1988–____ – Prevention Oriented – From 1988 on it was seen as prevention oriented period where tests were to demonstrate that software satisfies its specification, to detect faults and to prevent faults.
