= Rob Halprin =

American record producer

Rob Halprin production discography
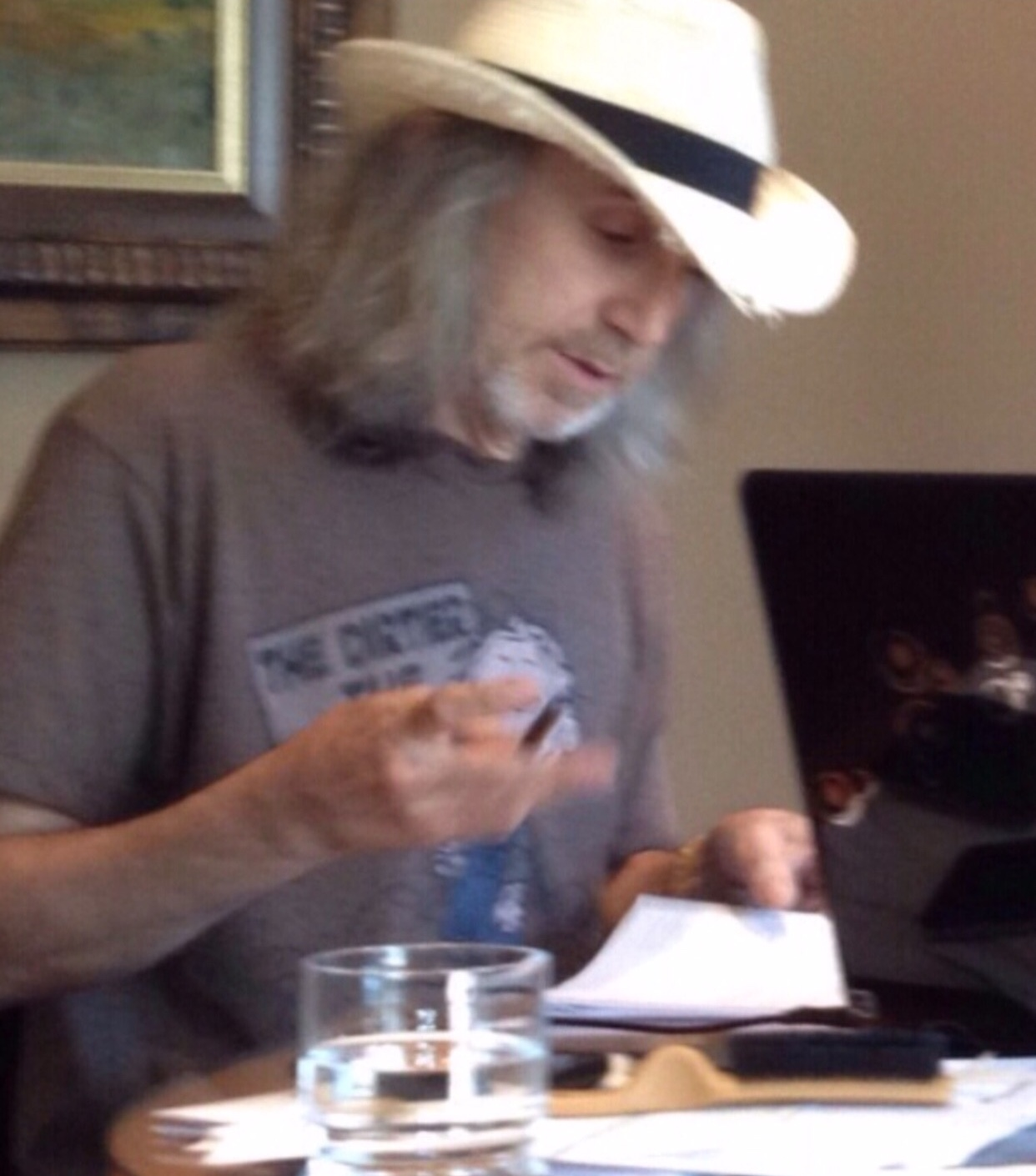
- Rob Halprin Pictured at Comic Con 2014
- Studio albums: I Love You So, Marathon Lover, It's Good, Eve, The Radical Light, Yelling at Mary, The Nineteen Hundreds, "Frost-Prism," "Ireek" "Deepthroat Love", “The Ferocious Few”.
- Live albums: Midnight Over Honey River
- Compilation albums: Vanilla Grits
- Singles: Your Lonely Heart, Winners, Marathon Lover, In And Out Of My Life, Lo And Behold, Midnight Over Honey River, Bitter Rain, Secret Lover. Ireek, Deepthroat Love, Frost, Prism

Robert David Halprin (born January 13, 1958) is an American record producer, executive producer and an independent record label owner. Halprin launched VRP Music, an independent record company, in 2000.

== Early life ==
Halprin was born in Jersey City, New Jersey, to Raymond Halprin, a department store manager, and Dorothy Halprin (nee Weiser), a homemaker. Halprin was a child actor and singer from the age of six, co-starring in a variety of performances both off-Broadway and in summer stock theater.

Halprin is "autodidactic", with a verifiable IQ in the "145 range", as tested on the Wechsler Intelligence Scale for Children (WISC), despite having only finished the eighth grade. Whilst appearing Off-Broadway at the Coconut Grove Playhouse in Miami, Halprin attended the Horizon School for Gifted Children. This is where his IQ was verified. As stated by School Master and Pulitzer Prize Prize winner Dr. Benjamin Fine as well as Halprin's French teacher, former Florida attorney General's Robert Shevin’s sister, Sandra Shevin.

== Career ==
In 1975, after leaving home at the age of 16, Halprin became an assistant to Barry Imhoff, the promoter responsible for the Bob Dylan "Rolling Thunder Revue" tour.

=== Barry Imhoff Productions ===
In 1977, whilst still a teenager, Halprin became Imhoff's silent partner in the merchandising venture, Barry Imhoff Productions. He later spent time as an assistant road manager to the Rolling Stones under head road manager Alan Dunn during the 1978 "Some Girls" tour, and Natalie Cole’s assistant road manager, under head road manager Lyle Baker in 1979.

Halprin is a co – songwriter on the Natalie Cole songs "Your Lonely Heart" and "The Winner" from her 1979 Capitol Records LP record I Love You So. The album reached peak positions of number 52 on the Billboard 200 and number 11 on the Billboard R&B Albums chart. Cole, Halprin, the writing, production and musicians were awarded an RIAA Gold Record for over 500,000 album sales. Cole, Halprin, and the writing group were nominated at the 22nd annual Grammy Awards for “Best R&B Album” that year, 1979.

Halprin played guitar and keyboards, co-engineered and co-produced two cuts on the 1980 Warner Bros. Records album by Natalie Cole and Marvin Gaye guitarist, Chuck Bynum entitled "Marathon Lover.”

=== Real estate ===
In 1984 following 9 years touring with Bob Dylan as Production coordinator Barry Imhoff’s assistant for The Rolling Thunder Revue tour, The Band’s final farewell concert and film The Last Waltz, co-writing and touring as an assistant road manager for Natalie Cole, as well as The Rolling Stones plus co-engineering, co-producing and playing on Natalie Cole and Marvin Gaye guitarists Chuck Bynum’s initial solo record released on Warner Bros. Records entitled Marathon Lover and his marriage Halprin and his wife, Patti, began a mortgage banking and luxury residential real estate firm headquartered in South Florida.

=== Return to the music industry ===
In 1992, Halprin became American singer-songwriter Valerie Carter’s manager, and eventually her executive producer. Carter later joined the artist roster of VRP Music, one of Halprin's numerous independent record labels he began in 1990.

=== Vesper Alley records ===
Halprin became a partner in Vesper Alley Records in 1996, a record label that was home to American singer-songwriter Vonda Shepard. Halprin financially supported the label's re-release of two of Shepard's albums, It's Good Eve and The Radical Light. In 1998, Halprin and partner Gail Gellman negotiated a deal for Shepard to join the cast of the television series, Ally McBeal, and Sony 550 Music regarding their financial interests in her music catalog. Both Halprin and Gellman sold their investments with Shepard.

=== Y&T Entertainment ===
Halprin became a partner in the Miami, Florida, independent record label Y&T Entertainment in 1999, the original home to American country music performer Raúl Malo and The Mavericks, along with American singer-songwriters, Mary Karlzen and Amanda Green. Halprin financially supported the label's re-release of Karlzen's "Yelling At Mary" album and CD, and Green's album and CD, "The Nineteen Hundreds."

=== VRP Music ===
After the sale of Y&T's headquarters, Criteria Studios, to The Hit Factory in 1999, Halprin financed his current venture, independent record label VRP Music in 2000.

Halprin was the executive producer and label head of VRP Music's 2001 Valerie Carter CD, Vanilla Grits. He produced Carter's single and double compact disc (CD), Midnight Over Honey River, released in 2002 and 2003 respectively by VRP Music. Carter's double CD included a live recording of American rock band, Little Feat, recorded at Jannus Live in St. Petersburg, Florida, on November 2, 2002.

In 2003, Halprin produced the track, "Bitter Rain," featured on the Universal Music Group CD, Yourself, Myself, The Songs Of Miyuki Nakajima.

In 2013, Halprin produced "Secret Lover" by the band "O" (formerly known as Black Cobra Vipers) in Oakland, California.

He continued to produce for "O" in 2015 on their album Ireek / Deepthroat Love.

In 2016, Halprin produced Cellar Doors’ album Frost / Prism.
