= Weber & Heilbroner =

- Formerly: Weber & Heilbroner and Finchley (by 1978)
- Company type: Men's clothing store
- Industry: Retail
- Genre: Men's fashion
- Founded: August 1909 (leased office space)
- Headquarters: New York City, New York, New York City
- Number of locations: At least 9 (1910), 13 (1922) (1910, 1922)
- Area served: New York City area
- Products: Men's clothing
- Revenue: $6,000,000 annually (1922) (1922)
- Net income: $243,489 (1922) (1922)
- Total assets: $1,379,017 (1922) (1922)
- Owner: Allendale Corporation (by 1937)

Weber & Heilbroner was a Lower Manhattan men's clothing company of the 20th century. In August 1909 the clothier leased office space in the Seymour Building, 503 Fifth Avenue. The corporation is noteworthy because of its importance to New York City consumers over a number of decades. As of 1937 the retailer was a wholly owned subsidiary of Allendale Corporation.

By 1978 the firm was known as Weber & Heilbroner and Finchley. It was being squeezed by competition because of its higher prices and the evolution of the men's fashion industry. When Botany Industries became bankrupt in 1973, it closed the Broadstreet's and Weber & Heilbroner's locations it owned.

== History of haberdashery ==
On Washington's Birthday, February 25, 1910, the Weber & Heilbroner store at 1185 Broadway and the northwest corner of 28th Street, was robbed of $3,000 to $4,000 of expensive shirts, neckties, gloves, hosiery, and other clothing items. Thieves were in the store for an hour. They benefited from the store's dim lighting and two large arc lights on Broadway, which shined into the store. At the time it was one of nine Manhattan locations operated by the clothing retailer. The Broadway store was next door to Keith & Proctor's Theatre. The area was considered one of the best policed regions of New York City, approximately three blocks away from the Tenderloin Police Station. The criminals were thought to have gained entrance to the store via the basement of the 28th Street side. Other Weber & Heilbroner establishments in 1910 were located at 42nd Street, 146 Broadway, 369 Broadway, and 20 Cortlandt Street. In May 1939 a new location opened at 160 Broadway near Maiden Lane.

In May 1916 the Johnson Building, 30 Broad Street, was leased by Weber & Heilbroner for a period of fifteen years. The space had a frontage of 40 feet on Broad Street extending along Exchange Place 150 feet. The rental price was $25,000 annually. The space had an additional frontage of 40 feet on New Street. Weber & Heilbroner added modern show windows with a new Broad Street entrance. The New Street and Exchange Place retail store was relocated to the southwest corner of Broad Street and Exchange Place in February 1935. The business leased the store space for ten years.

For the six months concluding on August 31, 1920, Weber & Heilbroner reported a net profit, after selling and administration, of $185,296. In August 1922 the company operated 13 stores in the New York City region. Gross sales amounted to $6,000,000 annually, with net sales totaling $243,489 for the year ending on February 28, 1922. Its working capital was considered good and it had endured deflation without sustaining large losses. Its assets were valued at $1,379,017 with liabilities of $467,197, and working capital of $911,820.
