= Mary Hall Adams =

American writer and editor (1816–1860

- Born: Mary Hall Barrett; September 16, 1816; Malden, Massachusetts, U.S.
- Died: December 8, 1860 (aged 44); Providence, Rhode Island, U.S.
- Resting place: Mount Auburn Cemetery, Cambridge, Massachusetts, U.S.
- Occupations: book editor, letter writer
- Spouse: John Greenleaf Adams (m. 1889)
- Writing career
- Language: English

Mary Hall Adams (née , Barrett; September 16, 1816 – December 8, 1860) was an American book editor and letter writer. Her writing includes, Never give up, or, How children may be happy and The Rainbow and Other Stories: A Juvenile Gift. For three years, Adams edited the Universalist Church-affiliated Sabbath-School Annual.

== Early years and education ==
Mary Hall Barrett was born in Malden, Massachusetts, on September 16, 1816, the daughter of William and Mary Barrett. Her mother worked among the poor of Malden. Her father, owner of the Malden Dye-House, believed in the principles of Christian Universalism. Rev. Dr. Sylvanus Cobb said: "When we commenced our pastoral charge at Malden, Mary Barrett was a girl of 12. Though her father was wealthy, and her associates were of the first class socially, she was ever modest and affable in her manners towards all. There was a combination of intellectuality and benevolence in her expression, and her highest concern was to enrich and adorn the mind. She entered heartily and efficiently into the work of the Sunday-school. Young as she was, she became a teacher and member of the Bible class. She joined the church at 16, and was ever one of the most earnest and faithful workers, and her enlightened and ever-glowing spirit of devotion added to the spiritual interest of the communion."

When quite young, Barrett's sister, father, brother and mother all died of consumption, and needed great care before their deaths, which Adams took upon herself to provide. Friends saw that Adams was overdoing herself and becoming frail, but her comforting was so well received by the invalids that they did not notice Adams' wasting frame.

She was never a "rollicking school girl". In addition to the instruction obtained in her home town, she attended schools in Medford and Charlestown.

== Career ==
In November, 1889, she married the clergyman Rev. John Greenleaf Adams, D.D. (1810-1887) and lived for 12 years in her childhood home as a pastor's wife. She shared her thoughts about the marriage via letters to friends: "To be a clergyman's wife has from my childhood been the acme of my desire; and I regard the day of my marriage as the commencement of my duties and pleasures, in anticipation of which my heart is joyous. It may be a way of trials, vexations, grievances. Let them all come! There has been One to sustain and impart fortitude to my heart, and his hand will still guide and uphold me." To another she wrote: "I am very sad at the thought of leaving so many dear friends, and this old home my parents lived and died in; and then, too, my dear mother, upon her dying pillow, gave into my charge my younger sisters to advise and counsel as far as was in my power, and that makes it hard indeed; but there is one whose home I am bound to bless and cheer, so think of me, dear friend, on the evening, about the time I shall stand at the altar, to promise, before God and the world, what my heart readily yields— allegiance to the laws of Christian love and a husband."

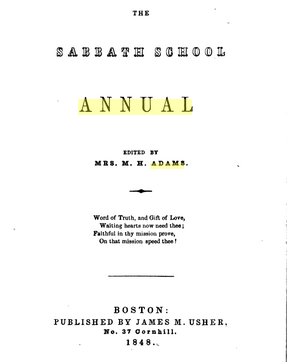
Sabbath-School Annual (1848)

Adams edited the Sabbath-School Annual, published by Rev. James M. Usher, Boston, for three years, and through her influence the best authors of the Universalist Church filled the book with the most instructive and attractive reading for young children. In a letter to one who assisted her by sending communications, Adams wrote: "I never more than at present felt the necessity of well-directed efforts to keep, to win, to reclaim the young from what is wrong and unholy; to kindle a love of pure and sound instruction within them, a love of Christ and his precepts in their hearts. I know you feel with me the importance of filling our juvenile papers and books with instructive lessons in morality and religion. We must think and talk more of heaven and God. We must not leave 'Father in heaven' and 'better home' to be mentioned only in prayers and in Sunday-school. We must talk of these things in the sunlight, over the needle, around the hearth on Monday or Tuesday, and not consider them Sunday or sick-bed topics nor leave them for the minister."

== Later life ==
When Adams' health was lessening daily, it was thought advisable to move inland, and so Rev. Adams accepted a call from the people of Worcester, Massachusetts, and removed there in 1852. Adams, being unable to attend to household duties, remained with her Malden friends until her new home was made comfortable for her. Her health for a time seemed to improve. Her memoir says she found congenial friends in her new town. Her first communion in Worcester she describes: "Here for the first time I sat with stranger sisters and brothers, away from that old sanctuary where I was christened, received into the visible church, married, and where my babes have been dedicated to the service and will of the Father. Here, on new ground, amid new faces, with stranger hearts all around me, away from kindred and home, I drew near to my God and Savior for their blessings, and the communication of the influence of the Holy Spirit."

In 1859, Adams' health rapidly failed; in December she had an attack of pneumonia, from which she never fully recovered. In 1860, Rev. Adams received and accepted a call to the Second society in Providence, Rhode Island. Just before going there, Adams wrote to a friend: "I shall never drive business any more; I have turned that corner, and left it out of sight. Henceforth I am to all intents and purposes a 'slow coach.' I draw comfort, however, in contemplating the poor snail. He moves slowly, but he moves. He accomplishes his journey and work; and, by the blessing of God, I shall mine, in due time."

Adams died December 8, 1860, in Providence, Rhode Island, and was buried in Mount Auburn Cemetery in Cambridge, Massachusetts.

== Style and themes ==
Among her closest friends were Sarah Carter Edgarton Mayo, Charlotte Ann Fillebrown Jerauld, Eliza Ann Bacon Lathrop, Rev. Edwin Hubbell Chapin, Rev. Thomas Starr King, Rev. Hosea Ballou, Rev. Sebastian Streeter, Dr. Hosea Ballou II, Rev. Thomas Whittemore, Rev. Lucius Robinson Paige, Rev. Otis A. Skinner, and Rev. John Wesley Hanson. Epistolary addresses written in her early life were kept among the memorials of her surviving friends. In most of these writings, there is an infusion of the religious, which was so strong a peculiarity in her character.

== Selected works ==
- 1847, Sabbath School annual for 1846- (text)
- 1850, Never give up, or, How children may be happy (text)
- 1850, The Rainbow and Other Stories: A Juvenile Gift (text)
