= Henrietta A. Bingham =

American writer, editor, preceptress

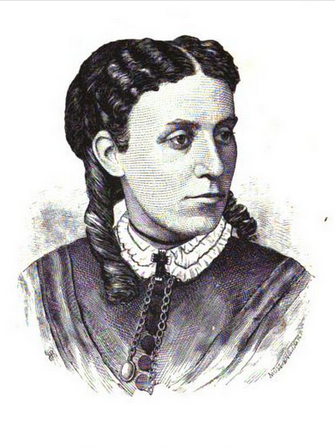
- Born: Henrietta Adelaide Burrington; December 29, 1841; Burke, Vermont, U.S.
- Died: February 18, 1877 (aged 35); Wisconsin, U.S.
- Resting place: Hillside Cemetery, Columbus, Wisconsin, U.S.
- Occupations: writer, editor, preceptress
- Spouse: Henry Lucius Bingham (m. 1866)
- Children: 3
- Writing career
- Language: English

Henrietta A. Bingham (née, Burrington; December 29, 1841 – February 18, 1877) was a 19th-century American writer, editor, and preceptress. She succeeded Phebe Ann Coffin Hanaford as the editor of the Ladies' Repository and the Myrtle, and was the last editor of the Ladies' Repository. In 1865, she wrote the prize story "Mignonette," competing with such writers as Caroline Mehitable Fisher Sawyer and Jane Lippitt Patterson. In 1869, Bingham became editor of the Ladies' Repository, of the Universalist Publishing House of Boston. She was marked for succession with Sawyer, Julia Kinney Scott, Sarah Carter Edgarton Mayo, Eliza Ann Bacon Lathrop, and Nancy T. Munroe. During the five years that she conducted that magazine, she developed a notable literary record. Her specialty was verse, but she also demonstrated ability with essay, editorial, short story, and sketch. One of her best poems was "L'Envoi," a midnight meditation on the passing year; "The Human Side" and "The Divine Side," were her greatest work, easily placing her in the front rank with writers of her time. In 1875, her failing health compelled her to give up writing and return to her old home town, where she died in 1877.

== Early life ==
Henrietta Adelaide Burrington was born on December 29, 1841. She was the youngest daughter of the second wife of Asahel Burrington of Caledonia County, Vermont. By the father's first marriage, there were three children, Rosalie Martha (Hall); Lindley Murray, a Universalist clergyman; and John Quincy Adams. By the second marriage, with Louisa Chapin Rice, there were four children, Howard Rice; Lorenzo Lester, Professor at Dean Academy; Solon Orville, a physician, who was the nearest brother in age; and Henrietta, the youngest.

On January 1, 1843, Bingham's mother died, leaving the children to the care of their elder half-sister, Rosalie. After the half-sister married and left home, Bingham never ceased pining for her.

== Education ==
Bingham learned to read before she was five. She was always classed with those older than herself, and invariably stood at the head of her class. It was quite often galling to her older brothers, who prided themselves on good scholarship, to have Bingham in their classes, and especially so when she had succeeded in solving some difficult problem, or unraveling some knotty construction in John Milton's Paradise Lost, which they had failed to fathom. When a child, she was a great reader, and eagerly read every book available to her. Indeed, reading was her greatest fault in those days, and she probably received more correction for reading while at work than for all other offenses put together; the greatest complaint of her step-mother was that "her head was always in a book." Her opportunities for reading were not great. Her father, being a farmer, had but few books, and there was no public library in the town; so her only resort was borrowing from her neighbors, which she indulged in quite freely.

At the age of 14, she taught at the Belden district. She was quite fond of teaching at this time in her life, and devoted a part of every year (the summer) to that work, until her school education was finished. It was during these years that she began to develop a literary talent. She amused herself during her leisure hours by writing little stories and sending them to her schoolmates to read, and occasionally wrote a little poem for their amusement. She was very shy in regard to these productions, and would never let any member of the family see them.

At 16, she left home to attend Green Mountain College, at South Woodstock, Vermont. Her oldest brother, as he became of age, had taken a portion of his first year's earnings and gone there to school. He sent home such glowing accounts of the school, and entertained such high hopes of a liberal education, that Henrietta began to lay similar plans for her future. When the second brother was making arrangements to go to South Woodstock, she urged him to take her with him; and as she was not happy at home, and her father thought he could not help her any, her brothers determined to educate her, and she was sent to South Woodstock. Here she spent the happiest days of her life. She was a careful and earnest student, and took great delight in her work. Her early love for reading was here allowed full scope. Her progress was rapid and thorough, and she often astonished her teachers by the ease with which she could master the higher mathematics and the French language. She soon began to show unmistakable signs of literary ability. Here she wrote many pieces, both in prose and in verse, intended for school essays, but which afterward found their way into the public prints. Many of her school compositions were written in verse, "Farewell Sixteen," "The Island of Dreams," and "My Mother," being of special mention. Here also she formed the strongest attachments of her life. Being mature in thought, though young in years, she early became the intimate friend of her teachers, and came to be regarded by them as an equal, rather than a pupil.

== Career ==
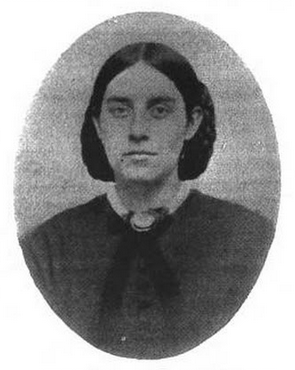
Henrietta A. Burrington

=== Vermont ===
After having completed the full course of study at the school in South Woodstock, she became its preceptress. During these terms, however, she began to feel that her line of duty did not lie in this direction. She had imbibed such a strong love for purely literary work that she determined to make that her occupation.

=== Massachusetts ===
In the fall of 1862 she set out for Boston, determined to spend the following winter there in a literary occupation. She soon found employment in the Universalist Publishing House for a part of her time, and occupied the remainder with study. She embraced every occasion that came within her means to hear lectures, concerts, readings, and to attend gatherings of every type. She was kindly received into Boston society.

=== Ohio ===
In Spring 1863, she received news from her half-sister, Mrs. Rosalie Hall, then living in Ohio, that her family was sick and needed her assistance. Upon reaching the sister's home, she found two of her four children very sick with typhoid fever, and their father in the Army of Tennessee, fighting battles during the American Civil War. Before the children had passed beyond the danger-point of their sickness, their mother became ill. Bingham, with the aid of neighbors and friends, nursed them to health. When Rosalie was convalescent, Binham was stricken with typhoid fever herself. Her illness was long and painful, her recovery was very slow, and her health was broken, never after becoming the strong and healthy woman that she was before.

=== St. Lawrence University ===
When the family had recovered, and her services were no longer needed, Bingham began to look around for some employment, as her sickness had greatly reduced her savings. She was very soon employed as preceptress of the preparatory department of St. Lawrence University, in which place she was a successful teacher. It was here that she formed the acquaintance which resulted in her marriage with Henry Lucius Bingham (1842-1866), March 29, 1866, a theological student in St. Lawrence University. Her husband was in feeble health at the time, and after five brief months, he died September 5, 1866. Her principal story, "Mignonette", was written in 1865. "The True Immortality", read at the first anniversary of the Zetagathean (seekers after truth) Society, of the Divinity School at Tufts College, was considered very able.

Some time in the fall of 1868, the office of The Universalist and ladies' repository (later, Ladies' Repository), Boston, received the manuscript of a poem read before one of the literary societies of St. Lawrence University. When the poem was read, it was judged as having merit of uncommon sort. The interest awakened by this poem led to inquiries about the author, of whom the journal had heard little. The agent of the Publishing House informed the periodical's publisher that the author of the poem, Mrs. H. A. Bingham, was also the author of "Mignonette", one of the 'Prize Series' of stories published by the house. The publisher took up that little book for the first time, and found in it the same strong lines of power traced in the poem.

=== Ladies' Repository ===
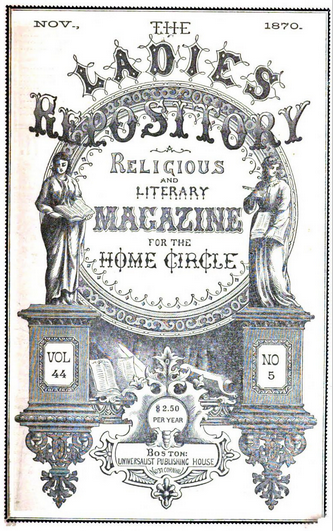
Ladies' Repository (1870)

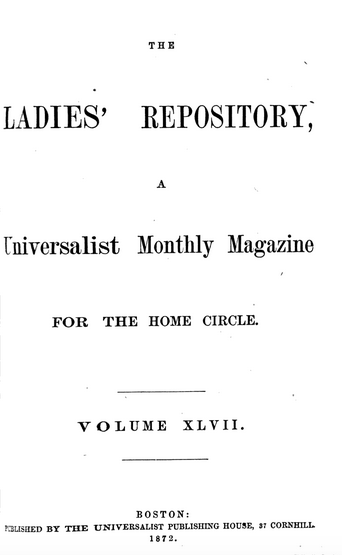
Ladies' Repository (1872)

At the end of 1868, Publishing House invited Bingham to Boston, where she became editor of Ladies' Repository in January 1869. She served as editor for five years.

It was during the comparatively brief period of her editorship that she made her record as a writer. Bingham was long acquiring the art and mastery which at length marked her out for succession in the line with Scott, Mayo, Bacon, Sawyer and Munroe. A manuscript volume, containing pieces written at intervals from the age of sixteen until she took charge of the 'Repository,' bears witness to the development of her intellectual and emotional life. She was known as a diligent writer who did not produce literature hastily and who was praised for her precision. When she claimed editorship the quality of her work was widely noted.

During Bingham's years with the Ladies' Repository, she wrote much poetry which yet was not verse. Examples were "Autumnal Rain", "Spring", and "Under the Snow." In each of her longer poems there are strokes of power and strains of melody, prophetic of loftier achievement. Her poetic works included "The Human Side" and "The Divine Side." "On the Edge of the Sea" is a sample of her healthier mood. Such poems as "Compensation," "Divided," "Out of the Depths," and "Sunset," because the element of personal feeling compels sympathy. She was herself aware that so strong a tincture of personal moods, especially when they incline to melancholy, is an alloy of the true poetic quality. Referring to the volumes of the Ladies' Repository between 1869 and 1875 for full memorials of her work, her most characteristic and perfectly finished poem, "L'Envoi" was a midnight meditation on the passing year.

=== Myrtle ===
In two other departments of prose writing, newspaper correspondence and in story-telling for children, Bingham showed versatility. The charm and naturalness of both her stories and verses in the Myrtle, a Universalist publication, during the period that she edited that juvenile, attracted the attention, and elicited the warm praise of hundreds of readers.

== Personal life ==
In the spring of 1866, she married Rev. Henry Bingham, of Columbus, Wisconsin, who died the following autumn.

Representing Massachusetts, in October 1873, she was a member of the executive committee of the First Congress of the Association for the Advancement of Women.

Bingham was enfeebled long before any outward sign appeared, but she persisted in her literary work until her strength was nearly spent, before she decided to go to the home of the parents of her husband, in Columbus, Wisconsin. She reached it March 12, 1875. No sudden change came, but a gradual decay commenced. Bingham grew weaker and weaker and died on February 18, 1877.
