= Luella J. B. Case =

American author (1807–1857)

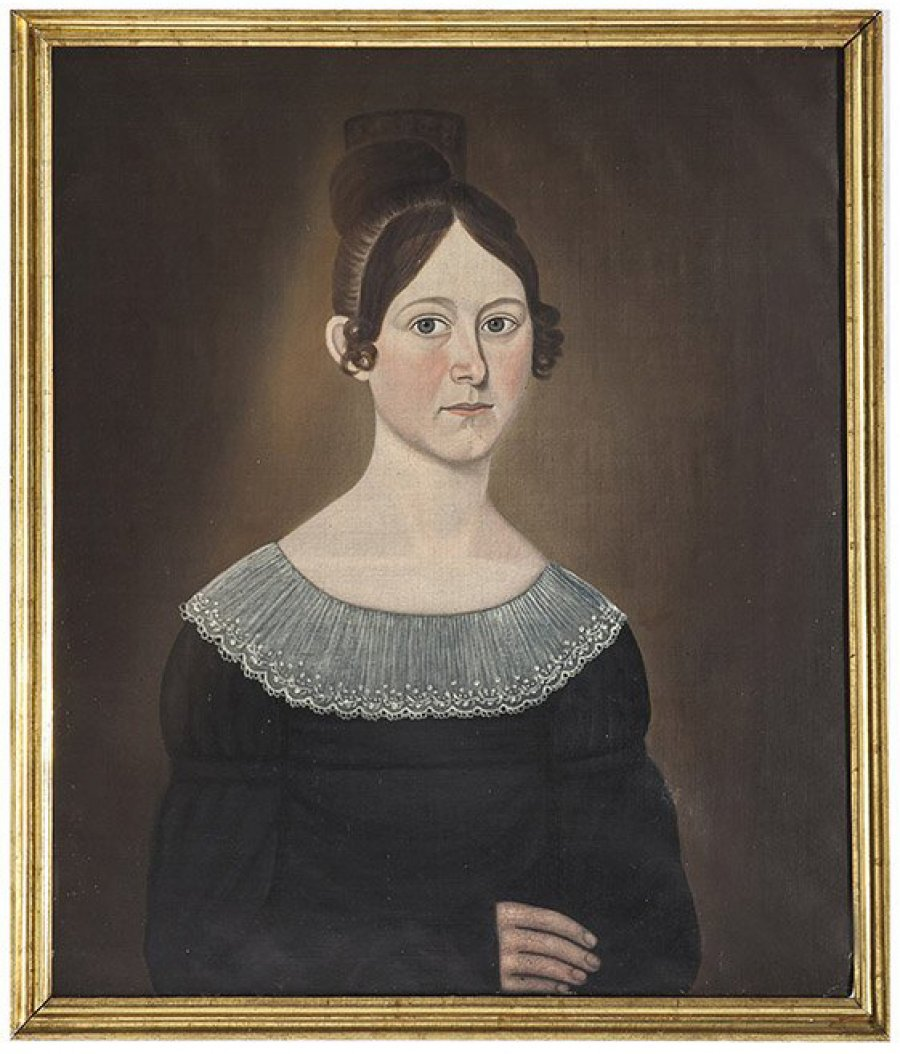
- Portrait of Case by John Brewster Jr.
- Born: Luella Juliette Bartlett; December 30, 1807; Kingston, New Hampshire, US
- Died: 1857 (aged 49–50); Kingston, New Hampshire, US
- Occupation: Author
- Spouse: Eliphalet Case (m. 1828)
- Relatives: Josiah Bartlett (grandfather); Francis Ormand Jonathan Smith (brother-in-law)

Luella Juliette Bartlett Case (née Bartlett; December 30, 1807 – 1857) was an American author. She wrote several popular books and was a contributor to various periodicals, including The Rose of Sharon, The Ladies' Repository, and The Universalist Review among others. Affiliated with the Universalist church, she also wrote hymns.

== Early life and education ==
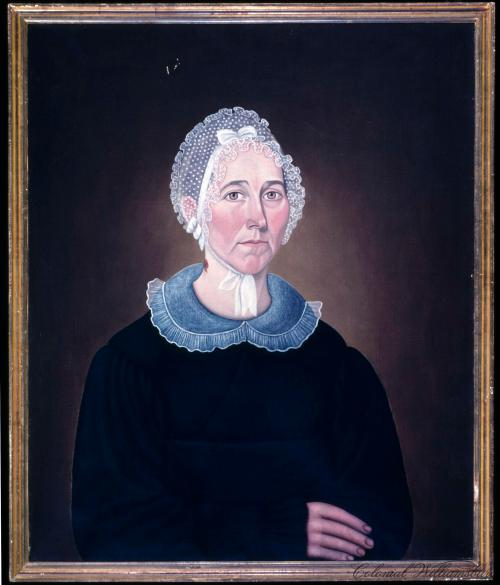
Abigail Bartlett (mother)

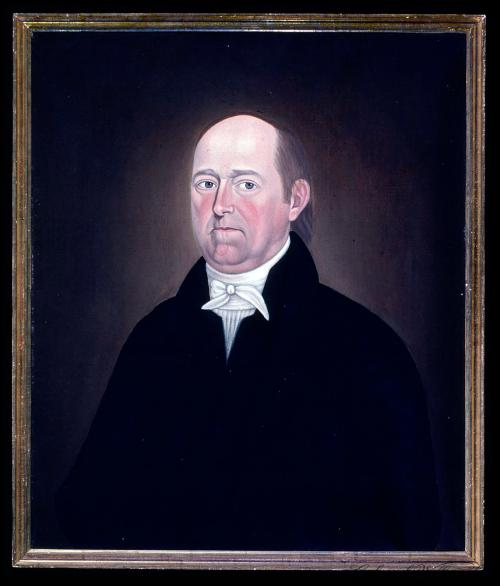
Levi Barlett (father)

Case was born on December 30, 1807, in Kingston, New Hampshire, the eldest daughter of Dr. Levi Bartlett (1763–1828) and Abigail Stevens Bartlett (1774–1840). Levi, a physician, judge, politician, and postmaster, was the eldest son of Governor Josiah Bartlett, Governor of New Hampshire, who was one of the signers of the Declaration of Independence, and upon the memoir of whose life Case was engaged at the time of her last illness. Case's only sister, Junia, was the wife of Francis Ormand Jonathan Smith. She also had a brother, Levi, a physician. Through Josiah, Case and her sister were affiliated with the Daughters of the American Revolution.

== Career ==
On May 8, 1828, Case married Eliphalet Case, then of Lowell, Massachusetts, and since that time, resided mostly there, as well as Portland, Maine and Cincinnati, Ohio. Mr. Case was an editor of several newspapers, and long-time postmaster at Lowell. While residing in Portland, Eliphalet was editor of the Eastern Argus. About 1845, they emigrated westward, and soon after, he became one of the editors and proprietors of the Cincinnati Enquirer. She contributed to the columns of the Enquirer several poems on Western themes. Many of her poems and short articles which appeared in the Enquirer attracted the attention of other journals, and were largely quoted with generous praise. In addition to poems and prose, she also wrote hymns.

Well-read in current literature, Case wrote little, but with a purpose. She was a contributor to The Rose of Sharon (a Universalist annual edited by her friend, Sarah Carter Edgarton Mayo), as well as to Mayo's Miscellany. She wrote for the Universalist Quarterly, and The Ladies' Repository, and to many of the denominational papers. She was a contributor to the Star of Bethlehem, edited by Rev. Thomas Thayer and Rev. Abel C. Thomas. Thayer said of her, "She at least, if any one, could say that she never wrote a line, which dying she would wish unwritten."

== Later life and legacy ==
In 1848, Case left her husband and returned to Kingston. About 1850, Eliphalet removed his family to Patriot, Indiana, near which town he cultivated a farm.

Case died in 1857, in Kingston, though the date is unclear. Hanson (1882) and Tenney (1913) record it as October 10, 1857; Levi Bartlett (1876) records it as October 30, 1857; while Coggeshall (1861) records it as September 1857. While Zboray & Zboray (2013) mention that Case was "ever-burdened with family duties", at her death, there were no living descendants. Her correspondence is held in a collection in the Schlesinger Library, Radcliffe Institute Repository.

== Selected works ==
=== Poems ===
- "Joan of Arc in Prison"

=== Hymns ===
- "Lord, on thy Zion's wall"
- "Love on, love on, but not the empty things"
- "Love on, love on, but not the things that own"
- "O where our Savior sweeps the line"
