= John Greenleaf Adams =

John Greenleaf Adams (1810–1897) was co-editor with Dr. E.H. Chapin of the Universalist Hymns for Christian Devotion and alone for the Gospel Psalmist, 1861.

Born in Portsmouth, New Hampshire, he married twice, including Mary Hall Barrett Adams; and had two sons and one daughter. He was ordained in 1833 in Rumney, New Hampshire.

Although rarely used outside his denomination, best known of his hymns are

- Heaven is here, its hymns of gladness
- God's angels; not only on high do they sing

His papers can be found at the Andover-Harvard Theological Library, Harvard Divinity School among which include correspondence with A. C. Thomas, Thomas Thayer, Lucius Paige, Moses Ballou, W. H. Ryder, J. W. Hanson, M. Goddard.
