= Charlotte A. Jerauld =

American poet

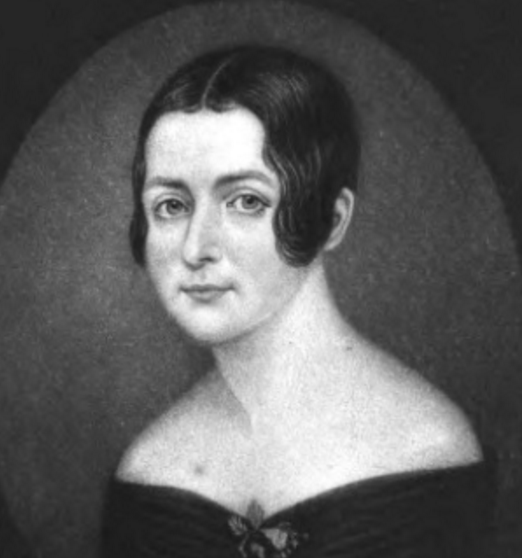
- from an 1860 book
- Born: Charlotte Ann Fillebrown; April 16, 1820 - August 2, 1845; Cambridge, Massachusetts, U.S.
- Died: August 2, 1845 (aged 25)
- Occupations: poet, story writer
- Spouse: J. W. Jerauld (m. 1843)
- Writing career
- Pen name: Charlotte
- Language: English
- Period: Romantic era

Charlotte A. Jerauld (née, Fillebrown; pen name, Charlotte; April 16, 1820 - August 2, 1845) was an American poet and story writer during the Romantic era. A zealous Universalist, she contributed to Christian magazines such as Ladies' Repository, the Rose of Sharon, the Universalist Quarterly, the Miscellany, the Union, and the Star of Bethlehem. Jerauld died in 1845, age 25, after a birth, her dead infant, five days old, buried in the coffin with her.

== Early life and education ==
Charlotte Ann Fillebrown was born in Cambridge, Massachusetts, April 16, 1820, to Richard and Charlotte near Harvard University. Charlotte was nine years old when her father died.

In early childhood, the family removed to Boston, where she was educated at the Bowdoin School and the Mayhew School. She showed an early skill for compositions. The teacher thought someone else was writing them on her behalf and she gave her a supervised test to prove it was her work. Her school was visited one day by Daniel Webster and Henry Clay. The teacher read some of the compositions and the gentlemen requested that the writer of one be pointed out to them. It proved to be Jerauld; both gentlemen complimented her, and Clay said, "I wish you were a boy; I would make a statesman of you."

== Career ==
Forced to support herself at 15, and preferring work that involved books, she entered a book-bindery, coincidentally the one that bound the Ladies' Repository, to which she later sent her first essay for publication.

In 1841, Jerauld published her first prose. Before this, she had published some poetry, but this was the real beginning of her literary life. It was entitled "Emma Beaumont." With her second story, "Margaret Leslie," came a note stating that the story was founded on facts, the heroine having been personally known to her. Of it, Sarah Edgarton said it, "almost cheated her into the belief that the plot was real, which is a proof of no ordinary skill." Jerauld's contributions to the Repository became quite frequent, every issue presenting something written by her.

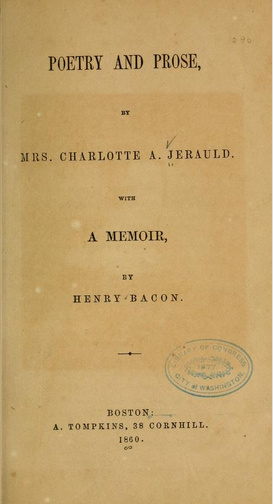
Poetry and prose

In 1842, she passed a week in Lowell with Edgarton at the home of Thomas Baldwin Thayer, where Jerauld received her First Communion. In the winter of 1842, she attended a course of lectures delivered by Richard Henry Dana Sr., on "Woman", Macbeth, Shakespeare in the supernatural, and Hamlet. These prompted her to study Shakespeare, Spenser and Milton. On November 19, 1843, she married J.W. Jerauld, after which she divided her time between domestic duties and literary pursuits, producing most of the stories, sketches and poems found in the volume Poetry and Prose, by Mrs. Charlotte A. Jerauld, with a memoir by Henry Bacon, Boston. A. Tompkins, 88 Cornhill, 1860, which first appeared in the Repository and Rose of Sharon.

Jerauld's literary development was heavily influenced by Rev. Henry Bacon. Jerauld's friends included Sarah Edgarton and Mary Hall Barrett Adams. Jerauld and Edgarton together wrote the series of Sonnets on the Lord's Prayer. Each had written a sonnet on a portion of the prayer, unknown to the other. Edgarton then suggested that they write on alternate portions of that prayer, and thus collaborate on a series of sonnets. They completed the work in 1844.

== Personal life and death ==
On the last week of July, 1845, Jerauld gave birth. Her child died August 1, and Jerauld herself died the next day. Jerauld and her infant were buried together in the same coffin.
