= Thomas Whittemore (Universalist) =

American politician and writer

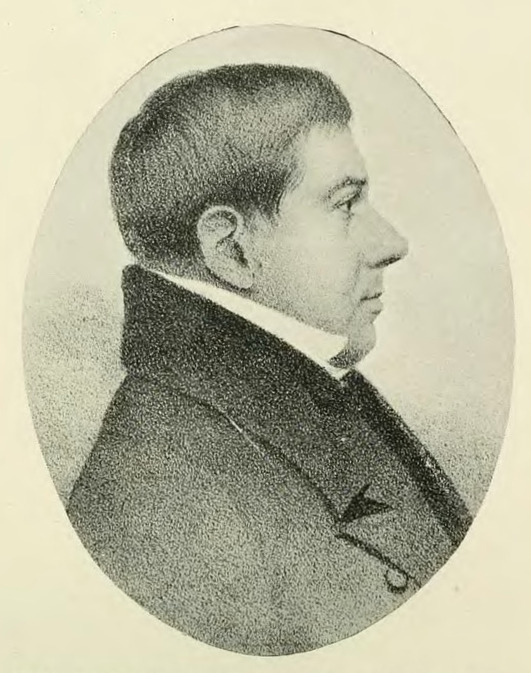
- Born: 1 January 1800
- Died: 21 March 1861 (aged 61)
- Occupation: Writer

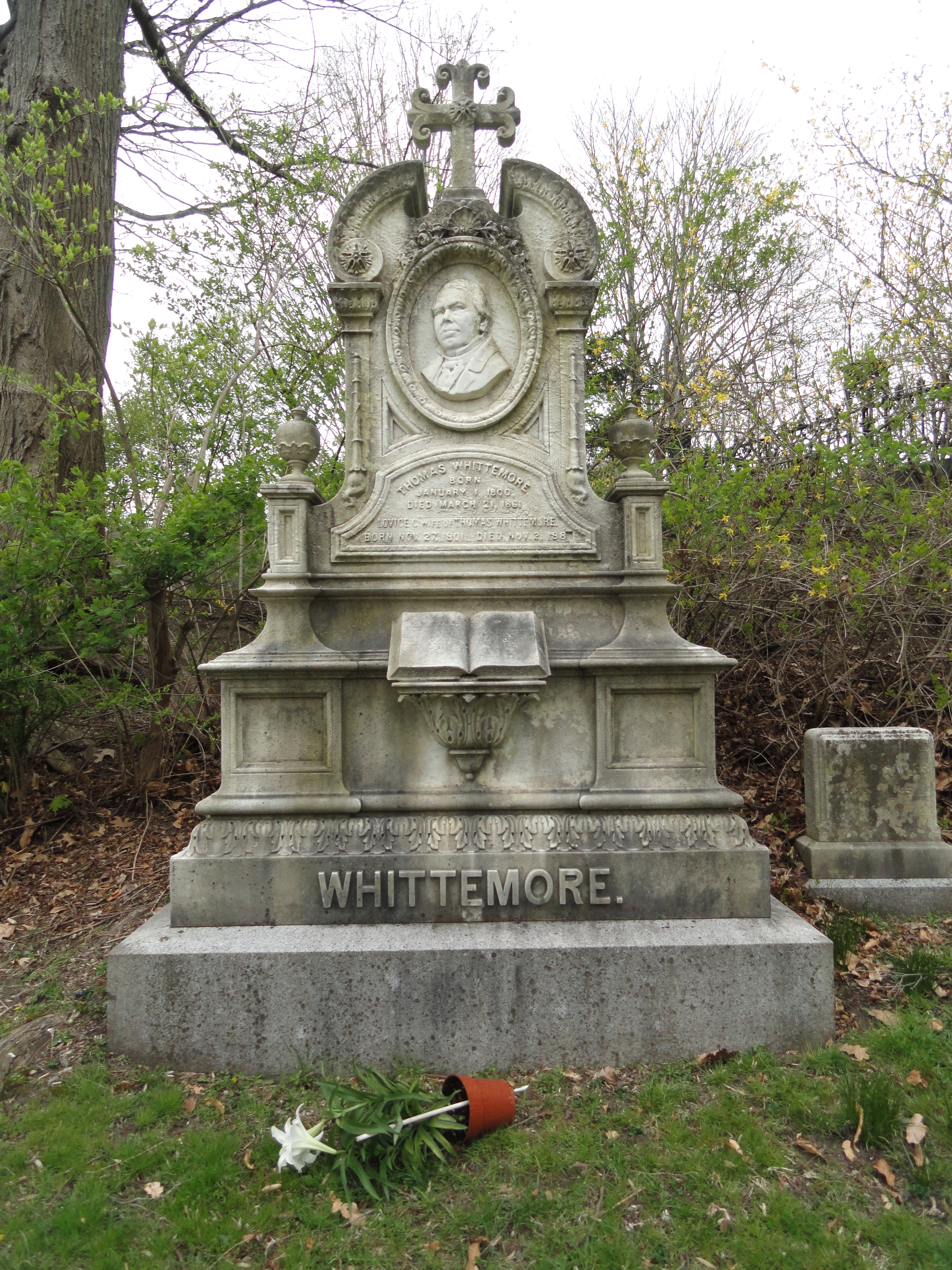
Thomas Whittemore grave, Mount Auburn Cemetery

Thomas Whittemore (January 1, 1800 – March 21, 1861, in Cambridge, Massachusetts) was a Christian universalist author, speaker and influential member of the Universalist Church of America. He founded and was the editor of The Trumpet and Universalist magazine, which succeeded the Universalist magazine of Hosea Ballou in 1828. He and Ballou held the view of ultra-universalism, believing that punishment in the afterlife did not exist and were opposed to universal restorationism, which claimed that it did.

Like Ballou and Ballou's grand-nephew, Hosea Ballou II, first president of Tufts College, Whittemore contributed to Universalist historiography by identifying precedents for Universalist beliefs in earlier Christianity. With Thomas J. Sawyer of New York, he co-founded the Universalist Historical Society in 1834. These histories were influential in bringing many readers to regard the Christians of the first centuries as Universalists.

== Massachusetts Legislature ==
From 1831 to 1836, Whittemore served as Cambridge's representative in the Massachusetts legislature, serving as chair of the committee that oversaw the disestablishment of the Congregational Church and Unitarian Church, to whose special status Whittemore was opposed, from the privileged position they had been accorded in the Massachusetts Constitution. Whittmore held that "no civil government has a right to compel the citizens to support any system of religion whatsoever" and supported calls for a popular referendum on the separation of church and state in 1834. The results of that referendum brought Massachusetts into accord with the First Amendment to the United States Constitution.

He was buried in Mount Auburn Cemetery.

His papers are in the Harvard Divinity School Library at Harvard Divinity School in Cambridge, Massachusetts; the Thomas Whittemore family papers are at Tufts University's Digital Collections and Archives.

== Ideas ==
"The glory of God, and of His Son Jesus Christ, as manifested in the final holiness and happiness of all men, is the central sun of Universalism."

-Thomas Whittemore, Plain Guide to Universalism

== Works ==
- The Modern History of Universalism 1830, revised 1860 - a companion to Ballou's Ancient History of Universalism which covers 1500-1800
- The plain guide to Universalism: designed to lead inquirers to the belief of the doctrine, and believers to the practice of it 1840
- "Universalists Sustain the Bible", in The Trumpet and Universalist Magazine, August 19, 1848
- "Decision of the Vermont Convention" in The Trumpet and Universalist Magazine, September 23
- Life of Rev. Hosea Ballou, 1855
- The early days of Thomas Whittemore: An autobiography 1860
- A commentary on the Revelation of St. John, the Divine 1848
