= Bury Me Not on the Lone Prairie =

Cowboy folk song

"Bury Me Not on the Lone Prairie" is a cowboy folk song. Also known as "The Cowboy's Lament", "The Dying Cowboy", "Bury Me Out on the Lone Prairie", and "Oh, Bury Me Not", the song is described as the most famous cowboy ballad. Members of the Western Writers of America chose it as one of the Top 100 Western songs of all time. Based on a sailor's song, the song has been recorded by many artists, including Moe Bandy, Johnny Cash, Cisco Houston, Burl Ives, Bruce Molsky, The Residents, Tex Ritter, Roy Rogers, Colter Wall, Eddy Arnold, William Elliott Whitmore, Sam Shackleton, and Clifton Hicks.

== History ==
=== Earlier version ===
The ballad is an adaptation of a sea song called "The Sailor's Grave" or "The Ocean Burial", which began "O bury me not in the deep, deep sea." The Ocean Burial was written by Edwin Hubbell Chapin, published in 1839, and put to music by George N. Allen.

=== First times in print ===
The earliest written version of the song was published in John Lomax's Cowboy Songs and Other Frontier Ballads in 1910. It would first be recorded by Carl T. Sprague in 1926, and was released on a 10" single through Victor Records. The following year, the melody and lyrics were collected and published in Carl Sandburg's American Songbag.

An article published in the Uvalde, Texas, Uvalde Leader-News in 1928 suggests that the origin of the song was the small town of Lohn, Texas. The article states that the song was originally about the Lohn Prairie, and was later changed to "Lone Prairie."

Originally collected with different music than that widely known today, "Bury Me Not On the Lone Prairie" first appeared in print with the present melody in 1932, with a likely origin of North Carolina, though the speaker at that time requested—contrary to other renditions—to "bury me out on the lone prairie."

=== Other versions ===
The song has been recorded by Moe Bandy, Johnny Cash, Burl Ives, Bruce Molsky, Tex Ritter, The Residents, Johnnie Ray (titled as "Bury Me Out on the Lone Prairie"), and Roy Rogers, among others.

In 1934, Carson Robison wrote the song "Carry Me Back To The Lone Prairie," with a similar melody and lyrics to "Bury Me Not On The Lone Prairie," although sung from a longing perspective appreciative of the prairie's scenery and wildlife.

== In popular culture ==
The "Bury Me Not On The Lone Prairie" music was adapted for the soundtrack to John Ford's 1939 western film Stagecoach. Its theme is heard repeatedly throughout the movie. It is also used in the 1948 western film Red River.

In the final episode of The Munsters, Lily Munster plays the organ while she, her husband, and her father sing "Bury Me Not on the Lone Prairie," after which she says "It's nice to get together and sing those old, fun songs."

Bugs Bunny sings the line "bury me not on the lone prairie" in at least four Warner Brothers animated shorts: 1942's The Wacky Wabbit (while shoveling dirt into a hole Elmer Fudd has just fallen into); 1945's Hare Trigger (after Yosemite Sam, mistaking red ink Bugs has poured on him for blood, falls down as if dead); 1980's Portrait of the Artist as a Young Bunny (while pretending to die); and 1992's Invasion of the Bunny Snatchers (on arriving at a desert). Woody Woodpecker also sings the song at the beginning of 1948's Wild & Woody!.

A version of this song was used in the video game Red Dead Redemption, sung by William Elliott Whitmore.

It also appears in the 2022 Billy the Kid TV series. It was performed by Tom Blyth Billy the Kid (TV series)

== Premise ==
The song records the plaintive request of a dying man not to be buried on the prairie, away from civilization. In spite of his request, he is buried on the prairie. As with many folk songs, there are a number of variations of that basic theme.

== Lyrics ==
This version of the lyrics date back to the early 19th century.

"O bury me not on the lone prairie."
These words came low and mournfully
From the pallid lips of the youth who lay
On his dying bed at the close of day.

He had wasted and pined 'til o'er his brow
Death's shades were slowly gathering now
He thought of home and loved ones nigh,
As the cowboys gathered to see him die.

"O bury me not on the lone prairie
Where coyotes howl and the wind blows free
In a narrow grave just six by three—
O bury me not on the lone prairie"

"It matters not, I've been told,
Where the body lies when the heart grows cold
Yet grant, o grant, this wish to me
O bury me not on the lone prairie."

"I've always wished to be laid when I died
In a little churchyard on the green hillside
By my father's grave, there let me be,
O bury me not on the lone prairie."

"I wish to lie where a mother's prayer
And a sister's tear will mingle there.
Where friends can come and weep o'er me.
O bury me not on the lone prairie."

"For there's another whose tears will shed.
For the one who lies in a prairie bed.
It breaks me heart to think of her now,
She has curled these locks, she has kissed this brow."

"O bury me not..." And his voice failed there.
But they took no heed to his dying prayer.
In a narrow grave, just six by three
They buried him there on the lone prairie.

And the cowboys now as they roam the plain,
For they marked the spot where his bones were lain,
Fling a handful o' roses o'er his grave
With a prayer to God his soul to save.

=== Alternative versions ===
One version collected for publication by the Southern Pacific Company in 1912 omits the final verse and concludes with another round of the chorus, which is there rendered:

"O bury me not on the lone prairie

Where the wild coyote will howl o'er me
Where the rattlesnakes hiss and the wind blows free

O bury me not on the lone prairie.

Another specifies that the speaker is "a trapper...at the point of death /...short his bank account, short his breath".

== Recordings ==
- Vernon Dalhart, 1922
- Avant-garde group The Residents performed it as part of their Cube-E performance project in 1989 and 1990, during a suite of cowboy songs.
- Kathy Johnson sings it in her album Way Out West (2000).
- Charlie Zahm recorded it on his 2003 album Songs for When the Sun Goes Down.
- Bruce Molsky plays and sings the tune on his album Soon Be Time (2006).
- William Elliott Whitmore recorded it for the game Red Dead Redemption (2010).
- Cameron Knowler recorded it on his 2019 album Honey off a Rock.
