= Caroline A. Soule =

American writer

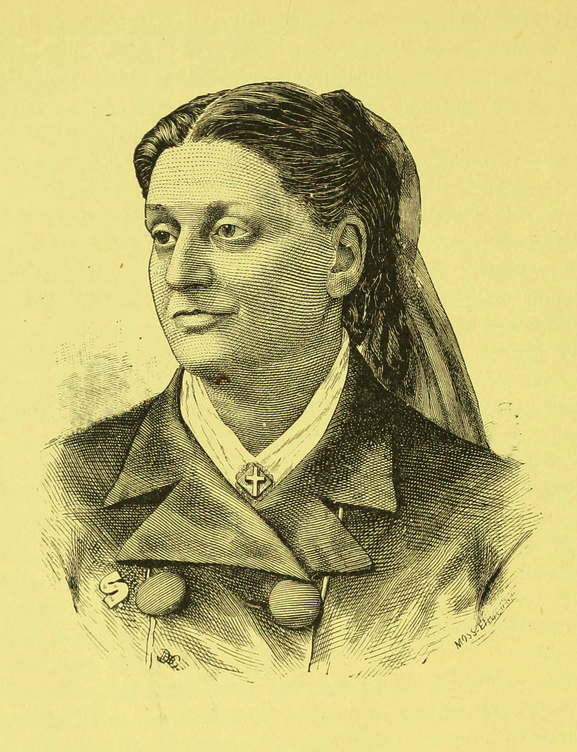
- Born: Caroline Augusta White; September 3, 1824; Albany, New York, U.S.
- Died: December 6, 1903 (aged 79); Glasgow, Scotland
- Occupations: Novelist; poet; religious writer; editor; Universalist minister
- Spouse(s): Henry Birdsell Soule (1843-1852); Ardon Benjamin Holcomb (1856–1879)

Caroline A. Soule (née, White; September 3, 1824 – December 6, 1903), was an American novelist, poet, religious writer, editor, and ordained Universalist minister, who was in 1880 the first woman to be ordained as a minister in the United Kingdom; first president and one of the founders of the Woman's Centenary Aid Association, the earliest national organization of American church women; and the first Universalist Church of America missionary when sent to Scotland in 1878.

== Early life ==
Caroline Augusta White was born on September 3, 1824, in Albany, New York, the third of six children of Nathaniel White (born 1792 in Hartford, Connecticut; died August 1849 in Albany, New York), a mechanic, and Elizabeth Merselis White (born 1797 in Albany, New York; died June 19, 1846), who had been a member of the Dutch Reformed Church. Only two of her siblings survived to become adults.

When she turned twelve, Soule began to attend the Albany Female Academy, graduating in 1841 with a gold medal for her essay, "The Goodness of God Not Fully Demonstrated Without the Act of Revelation."

== Career ==
In 1842, Soule was employed for two terms (seven months), without pay, as the principal of the female department of the Clinton Liberal Institute in Clinton, New York, a secondary school that had been founded in 1831 by the Universalist Church. Poor health compelled her to return to her family home in Albany.

While in Clinton, Soule worked with principal Henry "Harry" Birdsell Soule (born July 1815 in Dover, New York; died January 29, 1852, in Lyons, New York), and by the end of the first term they were engaged to be married. They were married on August 28, 1843, in Albany by their mutual friend Aaron B. Grosh. After living in Utica, for a year they moved to Boston (1844–45) where Henry Soule candidated, hoping to be chosen associate and successor to the aging Hosea Ballou at Second Universalist Society in Boston. However, while his peers regarded him as a talented preacher, he was not chosen for this important position. Poor health limited his career. His remaining pastorates were brief: Gloucester, Massachusetts (1845–46); Hartford, Connecticut (1846–50; and Granby, Connecticut, in 1851. While in Hartford Soule helped her husband edit the Connecticut Odd Fellow and started writing short stories for The Hartford Times and for Universalist magazines.

In January 1852 the Soules went to Lyons, New York, to pioneer a new Universalist church, but Henry Soule died of smallpox later that month, leaving Caroline Soule an impoverished widow with five children: Sarah Freeman P. Soule (born July 29, 1844, in Boston, Massachusetts; died April 26, 1906, in Boone, Iowa), Henry Channing Soule (born Feb 28, 1846, in Gloucester, Massachusetts; died July 2, 1863, in Davenport, Iowa), Frank Soule (born Oct 30, 1847, in Hartford, Connecticut; died June 15, 1916, in Kingsville, Missouri), Eugene Soule (born June 2, 1849, in Hartford, Connecticut; died August 15, 1872, in Boonesboro, Iowa), and Lizzie Soule (born January 14, 1851). Until her husband's death, Soule's role was that of the dutiful minister's wife, although she had sometimes helped him with his writing and editing projects. After his death, she taught school briefly, however Soule's chief income was from writing and work as a religious editor. She prepared a biography of her husband for the Christian Ambassador, which was also issued as a tract. Soon afterward she expanded it into a book, Memoir of H. B. Soule (1852). As her stories had been well received by the Universalist public, she continued to turn them out for such Universalist magazines as the Rose of Sharon and the Ladies' Repository. A collection of these tales, Home Life; or A Peep Across the Threshold, was issued by the Boston Universalist publisher Abel Tompkins in 1855. While living in Granby she also edited the Rose-Bud, an annual for young people.

In 1854, in order to live less expensively, Soule moved her family to a log cabin in Boonsboro, Iowa. In 1856 Soule married Ardon Benjamin Holcomb (Born June 23, 1804, in North Granby, Hartford, Connecticut; died September 29, 1879), a lawyer, and they had one son, Sumner White Holcomb (born August 29, 1857).

In 1856 Henry Bacon, editor of the Ladies' Repository (published by Tompkins), made her corresponding editor. Bacon's successor, Carolyn Sawyer, appointed Soule assistant editor, 1861–65. During these years she wrote two novels, Little Alice; or The Pet of the Settlement (1860), based on her life on the prairies, and Wine or Water: a Tale of New England (1862), a temperance story, both published by Tompkins.

After her older children had become adults, Soule moved to Albany, New York in 1863 to get medical treatment for her failing eyesight. In 1867 she moved to Fordham, New York, to live in a house that she named "Content" and opened an office in New York City where she continued her writing and editorial duties. She managed, edited, and contributed to the Guiding Star (1868–79), a semi-monthly for church school pupils. For seven months in 1873-74 she was the chief editor of the New York State Universalist newspaper, The Christian Leader.

At the Universalist Coneral Convention in 1869, Soule helped organize the Women's Centenary Aid Association (WCAA), created as a short-term organization to contribute to the Universalist centennial celebration by raising money for a new endowment fund. Elected president of the WCAA, Soule traveled across the United States urging Universalist women to join and to gather money for the John Murray Fund, named after John Murray, who had begun preaching Universalism in America in 1770, was created to help needy ministers and their families.) Her efforts included the raising of funds for an endowed woman's professorship at Buchtel College. By the 1870 Universalist General Convention the women's group had a membership of 13,000 and had raised $36,000.

In 1871 Universalist women founded a permanent organization called the Women's Centenary Association (WCA), the first national women's organization in the United States. The WCA (later called the Association of Universalist Women) has proved to be one of the most successful American Universalist organizations. Soule served as its first president (1873–80), delivering lectures, addresses, and sermons to any group who would listen to her, mailing Universalist tracts, and raising funds for the WCA, the Universalist General Convention, and several newly established Universalist colleges.

== Ministry ==
In 1874, Soule preached her first sermon, at the age of 49. On vacation to restore her health in 1875, Soule visited Scotland. As president of the WCA, which was at that time responsible for raising money for missionary work in Scotland, Soule was interested in meeting the Universalists there. There she preached, helped with the formation of the Scottish Universalist Convention, and participated in the dedication of the only church edifice owned by the Universalists, at Stenhousmuir.

Soule's first formal pastorate was to the Liberal Christian Association of Elizabeth, New Jersey, beginning in 1876. In 1877 the WCA voted to send Soule as their missionary in Scotland. Arriving in 1878, Soule preached in Dunfermline, Larbert, Braidwood, Lochee, Dundee, and Glasgow, and in England and Ulster as well. In her second year she settled among the Universalists of Glasgow, whom she helped reorganize as St. Paul's Universalist Church in Pitt Street.

In 1880, the Scottish Universalist Convention ordained Soule, making her the first woman to be ordained in the United Kingdom, and in Europe. She served as secretary to the Convention (1881–82).

During 1882–86, Soule returned to the United States, helping with the WCA and preaching in Hightstown, New Jersey (1882–83), and on tour in New England and throughout the West. Marion Crosley, a minister from Utica, New York, meanwhile filled the pulpit in Glasgow. In 1886 Soule returned to Glasgow, where she served until her retirement in 1892. She also filled the Unitarian pulpit in Dundee (1886–87), while her friend Henry Williamson visited the United States.

The Scottish Universalist Convention made her its honorary president in 1888.

== Later years ==
After her retirement in 1892, Soule remained in Scotland, where she continued to speak frequently. In 1894, Soule wrote: "I was always tired, for there was never a chance to rest. But fatigue in the cause of Universalism is infinitely better than inaction, apathy, indolence." By 1899 when she was listed in Who's Who in America, Soule resided at 71 Seymour Street, Crossmyloof, Glasgow.

== Works ==
- 1850. Rosa's Childhood, Or, The Influence of Principle. New-York: Lane & Scott, for the Sunday-School Union of the Methodist Episcopal Church; Philadelphia, PA: American Sunday-School Union, 1869.
- 1850s. --------, Sylvanus Cobb; and Francis P Pepperell. Isidore de Montigny: Or, The Smuggler of St. Malo. A Tale of Sea and Shore.
- 1852. Memoir of Rev H.B. Soule. New York: H. Lyon; Auburn, NY: V. Kenyon.
- 1853–1854. Editor. The Rose Bud: A Love Gift for Young Hearts.. Boston, MA: A. Tompkins & B.B. Mussey.
- 1855. Home Life, Or, A Peep Across the Threshold. Boston, MA: A. Tompkins & B.B. Mussey.
- 1859. Fanny Graham, Or, A Peep at the Heart: A Story for Children. Philadelphia, PA: American Sunday-School Union.
- 1860. My Christmas Present: A Holiday Token for Boys and Girls. Abel Tompkins.
- 1860. Little Alice: Or, The Pet of the Settlement: A Story of Prairie Land. Tompkins & Company.
- 1862. Wine Or Water: A Tale of New England. Abel Tompkins.
- 1860s. Little May, Or, Of what Use Am I? Philadelphia, PA: American Sunday-School Union.
- 1863. Home Life. Boston, MA: Tompkins & Co.
- 1868. --------; H.N. Greene. Butts; and Mathaniel Orr. "The Little Angel," a Temperance Story for Children. Four Lines of Verse. Hopedale, MA: Hopedale Age Office.
- 1874. God's Answer. [Belfast, ME]
- 1875 or 1876. -------- and Nellie H. Bradley. A Message to the Women of the Land. New York: National Temperance Society and Publication House.
