= Jane Lippitt Patterson =

American poet (1829–1919)

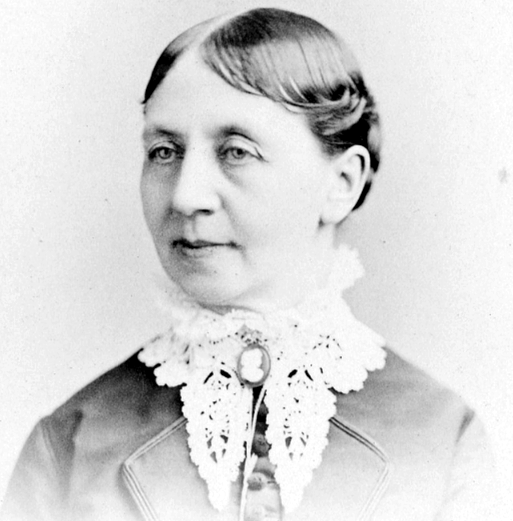
- Jane Lippitt Patterson
- Born: Jane Lippitt; June 4, 1829; Otsego, New York, U.S.
- Died: November 20, 1919 (aged 89)
- Education: Litt.D., Tufts College, 1905
- Occupations: writer, editor
- Spouse: Adoniram Judson Patterson (m. 1851)
- Writing career
- Notable work: Victory

Jane Lippitt Patterson (née, Lippitt; June 4, 1829 – November 20, 1919) was a 19th-century American writer and editor. For 20 years, she served as editor of the Home Department of The Christian Leader. The author of Victory, Out of Sight, Romance of the New Bethesda, and Buena Vista Windows, she also wrote 400 short poems, short stories and essays. Patterson was a Universalist who conducted services and assisted in the pulpit including at funerals. She was awarded a Litt.D. by Tufts College in 1905.

== Early life ==
Jane Lippitt was born in Otsego, New York, 4 June 1829. Her parents were Daniel Lippitt and Catharine (Burch) Lippitt. Her father owned and cultivated land, and in winter, he kept the district school. Patterson learned early all the tasks associated with farm life. She could spin flax, tow and wool, and before she was 12 years old, she made summer clothes for a younger brother out of linen which she had helped to manufacture.

At the age of 10, the family removed from New York to Pennsylvania, settling in Summit Township, Crawford County, a region comparatively new. Forests covered more than half the farm as the local houses were built of logs. For a brief period, her mother was homesick when she saw the home and its wild surroundings.

== Education ==
As a child, she was thoughtful and studious. She never appeared in school with a half-learned lesson. The "Log School-house on the Gore," which Patterson memorialized in one of her stories, "Willitts and I," furnished the neighborhood an intellectual center, and in summer, when some girl acted as teacher, or in winter, when an old professor graced the low room, there was enough to learn, and, always, either there or at home, the needed help for Patterson.

At the age of 12, she became ill, and for three years, was unable to attend the "Log School-house on the Gore". When she returned with regularity, at the age of 15, it was in the capacity of a teacher. She was then scarcely well, and the walk down and up the precipitous banks of Pine Run accelerated her heart-beats much beyond what was healthy for her, but the school needed a teacher, and she needed the school.

During the years of sickness, she studied constantly when not wholly prostrated. Under the daily instruction of her competent father, her progress had been more rapid than if she had been a pupil in a seminary. The meditations of those weeks when confined to the bed were perhaps the best preparation for the next phase of her life. One day, an aunt, who made her home with the family, and was interested and helpful, almost like a mother, sat reading the New Testament aloud in Patterson's room. It interested her to the extent that Patterson took the Bible and read it herself seven times. At the beginning of her religious inquiry, she found a helper, a neighbor, Benjamin Skiff, who loaned her books—the "Life of Murray," "Ballou's Sermons," an English treatise on Endless Punishment, and other works.

== Career ==
=== Western Pennsylvania ===
When she was 16, she taught school in the Rundell neighborhood. Nearly every patron of the school was a Universalist. About this time, she began to send occasional poems and letters to "The New Covenant". She also published a few pieces in the "Trumpet" and the "Star." Samuel P. Skinner, editor of the "Covenant," mentioned Patterson's contributions favorable, and inserted everything which she sent.

At the age of 22, on August 26, 1851, she married Rev. Adoniram Judson Patterson, D.D., and went with him to his mother's house, where they lived for nearly two years. Rev. Patterson's parents had dedicated him to the ministry from his birth, and his early education was directed to this profession, but the death of his father rendered it necessary that Rev. Patterson sort out certain business dealings so that his mother might have financial security. The young wife lent a hand in the business endeavors.

In the spring of 1858, they left the home of Rev. Patterson's mother for Western Pennsylvania, being centered in Girard, Pennsylvania. For more than two years, Patterson worked with her husband in the growth of the minister. Had the opportunity for woman been available at the time, she would have been a minister. During the two years in Girard and the 11 years passed in Portsmouth, New Hampshire she gave little to the press. An occasional poem or a brief letter was all she could provide. She took care of her house, and did what she could to help the old and sick of the parish. When an editor, who had been guest in her home, asked her for articles for his magazine, she professed to understand him as desiring a recipe for making bread, which she wrote out with great precision, and which he published.

=== American Civil War ===
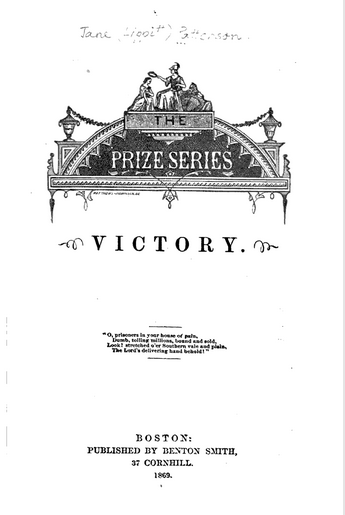
Victory

The American Civil War shook her and her letters became voluminous, full of the passing events of the time. She scarcely wrote a poem. On a certain evening, feeling great loneliness, she began a story of the times. On other lonely evenings she took up the theme, until she had written 150 manuscript pages. The prizes of the series which was published while R. A. Ballou was agent of the Boston House, were pending. Ballou suggested to Rev. Patterson that his wife write. There was yet a month before the close of the time when the manuscripts must be in. To finish the story already begun in so brief a time, with all the work of the home pending, seemed impossible. But there was no time to pause. It was at once decided that Rev. Patterson should prepare the dinners, and relieve his wife of all company during the early part of the day, and she would try to finish the story in the time allotted. She found the quietest corner of the house, and went to work on a Monday morning. She hung her watch in front of her, that she might not be tempted to dream over her sentences. She made from 25 to 28 pages each morning for five days in the week, giving Saturday to domestic duties. After dinner, she ransacked great files of "The Rebellion Record," that the dates of events might be entirely accurate, and sometimes, over-weary, slept. In three weeks, the story was completed. On the fourth, she copied the first 150 pages, which were written on scraps of any sort, never thinking of the printer, and sent on her manuscript several days before the expiration of time. In that day, there were on record few equal feats of rapid writing. The committee spent nearly a year reading the manuscripts, of which there were over 30. The first prize was unanimously awarded to Patterson's story. Competent judges are of the opinion that if Victory had been published as soon as it was written, and just at the close of the war, it would have circulated widely. As it was, the sale was largely within the Universalist denomination, the outside world fearing a secular book with the Universalist stamp.

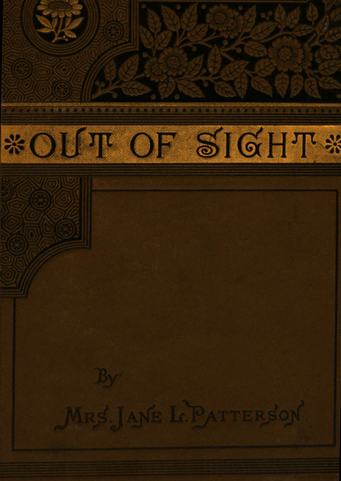
Out of Sight

As it was passing through the press, in the Spring of 1866, the agent of the house urged Patterson to write a serial for the " Ladies' Repository". She had assisted him in editing the magazine during the winter, and had written two short stories, "My Hero" and "Pine Sun Bridge." She undertook the task of a long story with great reluctance, doubting her strength to accomplish it adequately. But the need of the Universalist church of books suitable for Sunday school, she produced Out of Sight, a story into which she wove much of her own life. While it was passing through "Ladies' Repository", the house changed agents, and the story was never re-published in book form, according to the original intention.

=== Massachusetts ===
The change of homes to Roxbury, Boston came about this time, and the sorrow of leaving old places and friends, and especially her beloved sister and her growing family, coupled with the over-strain in her work, brought on nervous prostration, which rendered her a semi-invalid for two or three years, and from which she did not wholly recover. She was obliged to do her mental work in the mornings, even the writing of a letter after dinner often causing great prostration. Her contributions of prose and verse to the "Ladies' Repository" while Mrs. Bingham edited the magazine, were as frequent as her strength would allow. The first time they met. Patterson had in hand a story of 20 pages or more, with which Bingham was pleased to read, and it appeared in the first number which she edited. After "Willitts and I," came " The Belle of the Prairie," "Over the Plains," "Which is Better," "The Romance of High Rocks," "My Lost Banker," and other prose articles and poems.

In January, 1879, Patterson became one of the editors of the "Christian Leader," having exclusive charge of the "Home Department." By stipulation, her work was chiefly that of selection. But was not content to fill the page always with the thoughts of others, and when the spirit moved her she wrote a poem or a story. Friends outside her church tried to enlist Patterson in secular periodicals, assuring her that she could receive much greater compensation; but she was so consecrated a Universalist that she was never tempted to do so.

=== Pulpit ===
In the summer of 1872, she traveled west with her sick husband, and was prostrated in Saint Paul, Minnesota with malarious fever. Up to that time, she had suffered greatly from diffidence, dreading to face strangers and never lifting her voice even in the conference room. Face to face with death, she forgot to care what the world might say of her or her work. When her husband, after their return, was again prostrated by illness, she went at his urgent plea into his pulpit and conducted the Sunday service.

The people, who knew how shrinking she had been in the past, were electrified at her appearance in this high place. After the service, which the people said was conducted as if she had "done it a thousand times," they gathered about her, and requested that she take the place of her husband whenever he needed the assistance of a minister, if she was able to do so. He was ill at repeated intervals, and she served in his stead several times. When his health became restored, she took care of her home, unless some sick minister or needy church or institution called for her help. Patterson had a deep interest in young ministers and in the young men fitting for the ministry. Many of the young men, while in college, stayed in her home, and about a dozen affectionately called her mother. When a class in the Divinity School requested of her a poem for their Zetagathean Anniversary, she wrote "The Divine Call." With no children of her own to educate, Patterson was attentive upon the education of the young. Almost constantly for many years, one or more young persons lived in her home, while studying in Boston schools.

In the summer of 1878, Rev. Patterson visited Europe. As soon as the voyage was suggested, the Committee of the Roxbury parish asked that Patterson supply the pulpit until her husband's return. She cheerfully accepted the charge, not only preaching on Sunday and attending the Sunday-school and the week-day meetings, but visiting the sick, attending funerals, and answering every call for help, and the congregation steadily increased in size.

== Death ==
Jane Lippitt Patterson died in Roxbury, Boston, Massachusetts, November 20, 1919.

== Selected works ==
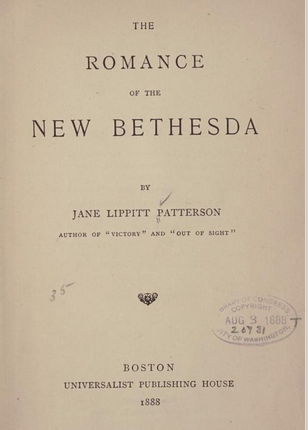
The Romance of the New Bethesda

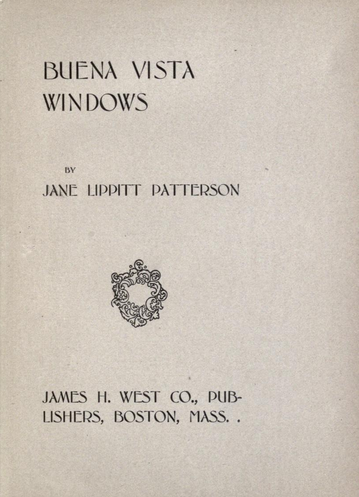
Buena Vista Windows

=== Novels ===
- Victory
- Out of Sight
- Romance of the New Bethesda
- Buena Vista Windows

=== Short stories ===
- "Willitts and I"
- "The Belle of the Prairie"
- "Over the Plains"
- "Which is Better"
- "The Romance of High Rocks"
- "My Lost Banker"
