= The Universalist and Ladies' Repository =

Former periodical

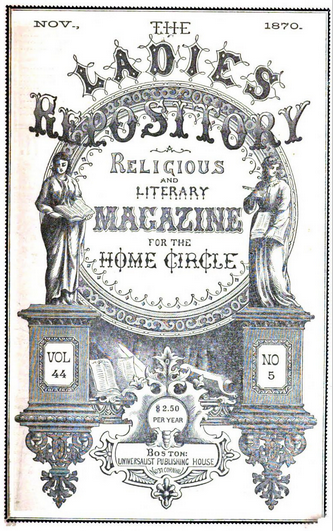
Ladies' Repository (1870)

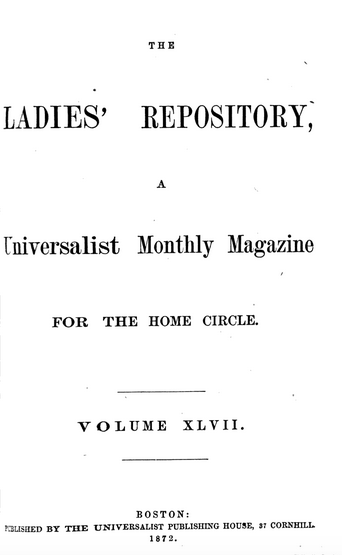
Ladies' Repository (1872)

The Universalist and Ladies' Repository was an American periodical published by the Universalist Church of America in Boston under various names during the period of 1832 to 1873. During the period of 1834–1843, it was published in Boston by Benjamin B. Mussey as Universalist and Ladies' Repository. In 1844 and through 1873, it was published in Boston by Abel Tompkins as Ladies' Repository.

== History ==
Encouraged by past success, the Proprietor was induced to issue proposals for the third volume of The Universalist. In order that it would not interfere with other publications advocating the doctrine of Universal Salvation, he was, in compliance with the advice of his friends, concluded to make an addition to its name and character. It would continue to advocate the doctrine of a world's salvation by Jesus Christ. Moral, practical, experimental and consolatory subjects would receive a due share of attention. Notices of passing events, interesting to the religious public; brief reviews of rare and popular works; poetical effusions, and everything which would tend to render a publication of the kind entertaining and useful, would continue to be included in its columns. Its tone was mild, generous and charitable; but at the same time, distinct, manly and firm. The proprietor stated there would be an aim to make its style chaste, and its literary character generally such as shall command respect. It would advocate the rights of women, and earnestly contend for female education. In a word, no pains would be spared to render The Universalist and Ladies' Repository a welcome visitor at the dwelling of every female Universalist. The third volume of the periodical commenced on Saturday June, 1834. It was published in Boston every week, quarto size 3. Subscribers could purchase it at US$1.25 in advance, $1.50 in six months, and $1.75 at the close of the year.

Henry Bacon, on issuing the Prospectus of a new volume of the Universalist and Ladies’ Repository, presented a brief statement of the object in conducting this periodical, and the reasons that caused him to confidently expect a liberal patronage. He purposed in the continuation of the labors, to advance the cause of religious truth, Christian morality, and human improvement and happiness. To this he dedicated his work; and in the furtherance of the object, endeavored to lay before the readers such a variety of subjects, as would tend to enlighten the mind in the knowledge of the great truths of Universalism. He would avoid the two extremes of too grave and too gay, and aimed to preserve a cheerful character, without descending to frivolity, believing that moral and religious truths could be presented in a pleasing garb and attractive form. To woo youth from thoughtless indifference, and win the young mind to the proper culture of its moral powers and religious feelings would be a prominent part of the plan. The periodical would continue to be the constant advocate of female education, and the proper dignity of woman; and it would devote a large portion of its pages to the especial benefit of women. In time, he intended the work to be useful, moral, entertaining, polite literature, embracing a wide range of subjects; and by the assistance promised by able writers, and the publisher's own knowledge gleaned from the past in reference to the proper manner of conducting the work, it would far exceed its value. He expected a generous patronage because he meant to merit it within the Universalist community. Going forward, The Universalist and Ladies' Repository would be published in Boston regularly on the 15th of every month, in royal octavo form, 40 pages, printed on fine paper, with clear, handsome type, stitched and neatly covered, at the price of $2.00 per annum in advance.

Published by the Universalist Publishing House, Volume XXVI of The Ladies Repository commenced July 1857 with Eliza Ann Munroe Bacon, editor; Nancy T. Munroe, assistant editor; Caroline Soule, corresponding editor. Henrietta A. Bingham succeeded Phebe Ann Coffin Hanaford as the last editor of Ladies' Repository.

== Notable people ==
- Eliza Ann Munroe Bacon
- Henry Bacon
- Henrietta A. Bingham
- Phebe Ann Coffin Hanaford
- Nancy T. Munroe
- Benjamin B. Mussey
- Caroline Soule
- Abel Tompkins
