= Amory Dwight Mayo =

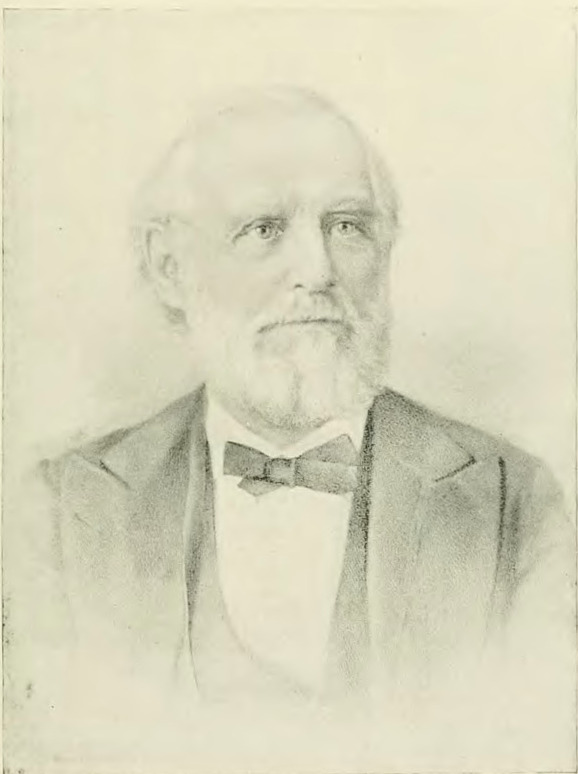
- Born: 31 January 1823
- Died: 8 April 1907 (aged 84)
- Alma mater: Amherst College
- Occupation: Cleric
- Spouse(s): Sarah Carter Edgarton Mayo

Amory Dwight Mayo (31 January 1823 - 8 April 1907) was a Christian clergyman and educator.

== Biography ==
Amory Dwight Mayo was born in Warwick, Massachusetts, the son of Amory Mayo and Sophronia Cobb. He enrolled at Amherst College in 1843. During his first year, illness forced him to leave school. For a short time he taught at district schools, but interest in the ministry led him to begin studying theology with Rev. Hosea Ballou II. By 1846, Mayo was an ordained Universalist minister.

=== Ministry ===
Mayo's first congregation was in Gloucester. His preaching style, according to his parishioners, was appealing, enlightening, and spiritually uplifting, and his popularity led to ever-increasing church attendance. Mayo's health, however, was unsteady, sometimes preventing him from delivering church services. Nevertheless, many of his sermons were collected in his works The Balance; or, Moral Arguments for Universalism (1847) and Graces and Powers of the Christian Life (1853).

In 1846, while serving as minister at Gloucester, Mayo married Sarah Edgarton (Sarah Carter Edgarton Mayo), a writer and editor. Sarah died only two years after their marriage. In 1853 Mayo married Lucy Caroline Clarke and they had five children.

In October 1854 Mayo resigned his pastoral duties at Gloucester, responding to an invitation to become pastor of the Independent Christian Church in Cleveland, Ohio, where he served for the next two years. This appointment was less fruitful than he expected, and in 1856 he relocated to Albany, New York, where he ministered at the Division Street Unitarian Church until 1863. While there he delivered the dedication address for the Green Hill Cemetery. In 1859 he published the book Symbols of the Capital: Civilization in New York. In 1863 he accepted a position as preacher of the Church of the Redeemer in Cincinnati, Ohio.

Also in 1863, while residing in Cincinnati, he accepted a position as nonresident professor of administration and church polity at Meadville Theological School (Pa.), a position he maintained for the next 35 years.

Initially, the Meadville Seminary faculty consisted of three resident and five nonresident instructors. Among other duties, Mayo delivered an annual course of 12 to 15 lectures on principal denominational creeds and their varied methods. He also discoursed on religious reform and policy. After 1883 Mayo delivered these lectures on a triennial basis.

In 1872 Mayo left Cincinnati to preach at the Church of the Unity in Springfield, Massachusetts. He retained his position in Springfield until 1880, when he resigned from active ministerial duties and devoted more time to writing and lecturing.

=== Educator ===
In 1880 Mayo's interests became more directed toward educational pursuits. He had been interested in education since his ministerial work in Albany and had served on both the Cincinnati and Springfield school boards. He had also served as a leader of the Christian Amendment movement, which advocated a provision in the United States Constitution affirming the right to teach the Bible in public school. With his move to Boston in 1880, his interest in education, particularly education in the South, became a driving force. For the next twenty years Mayo devoted himself to advancing Southern education. Traveling an estimated 200,000 miles, he lectured, delivered sermons, and consulted numerous southern educators. Since most of his lecturing and counseling were provided gratis, Mayo was forced at first to depend on an annual grant from the American Unitarian Association and later on contributions from friends and well-wishers. Owing to his behavior and personality, he was usually well received by blacks, poor whites, and members of the middle class.

From 1880 to 1885 Mayo, between travels, served as associate editor of the New England Journal of Education and as a chief editorial writer for the National Journal of Education. At the request of Dr. William T. Harris, U.S. commissioner of education, Mayo dedicated himself to writing the history of American common schools. The work was uncompleted at his death.

Between 1893 and his death, Mayo was listed as lecturer of education at Berea College, Kentucky. His lectures on various aspects of southern educational problems and reforms and the educational condition of southern blacks and whites were given during frequent visits to Berea. Mayo died at his home in Washington, D.C.

== Publications ==
- Selections from the Writings of Mrs. Sarah C. Edgarton Mayo: With a Memoir by Her Husband (1849)
- Symbols of the Capital; or, Civilization in New York (1859)
- Religion in the Common Schools (1869)
- The Bible in the Public Schools, with Thomas Vickers (1870)
- Talks with Teachers (1881)
- The New Education in the New South (1883)
- Industrial Education in the South (1888)
- A Ministry of Education in the South (1889)
- The Progress of the Negro
- Southern Women in the Recent Educational Movement in the South (1892)
- The Government of the South by the Plain People (1905)
