= Hosea Ballou II =

American Universalist minister (1796–1861)

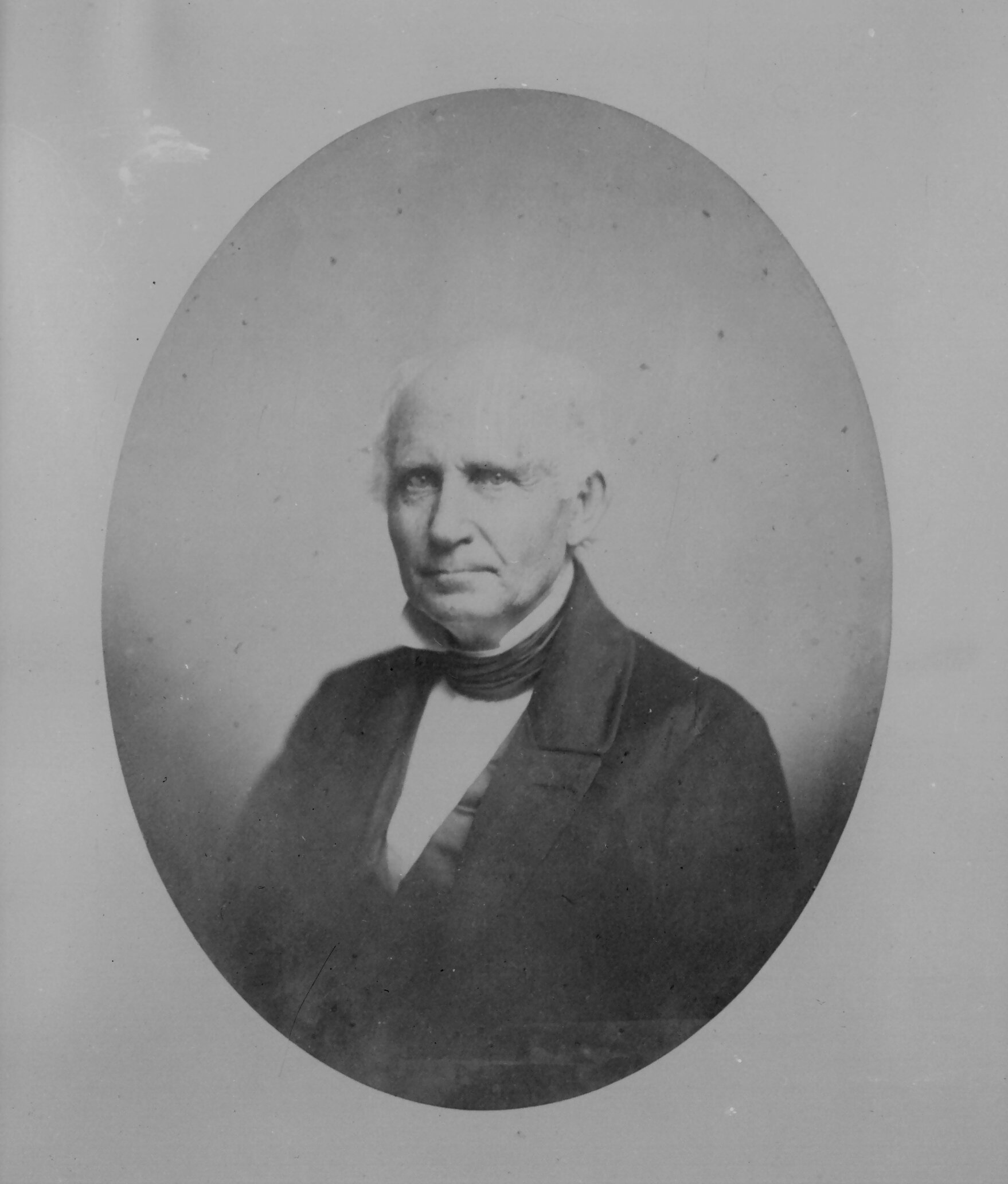
- Hosea Ballou II, 1858

1st President of Tufts College
- In office 1853–1861
- Succeeded by: Alonzo Ames Miner

Personal details
- Born: October 18, 1796 Guilford, Vermont
- Died: May 27, 1861 (aged 64) Medford, Massachusetts

Hosea Ballou II (October 18, 1796 – May 27, 1861) was an American Universalist minister and the first president of Tufts University from 1853 to 1861. Ballou was named after his uncle and went by the name "Hosea Ballou 2d." Publishers, friends, editors, Tufts College staff, and others generally followed this example. The title of this article reflects the more recent generational suffix usage of the Roman numeral II for those named for an uncle. Ballou used the ordinal number suffix "2d" rather than "2nd."

== Life and career ==
Ballou was born in Guilford, Vermont, the son of Asahel Ballou and Martha Starr, a descendant of Comfort Starr, one of the original incorporators of Harvard College. Hosea Ballou II was also the grand-nephew of Hosea Ballou, and was associated with him in editing The Universalist Quarterly Review. He married Clarissa Hatch of Halifax on January 26, 1820, and they had seven children.

On July 26, 1821, he was installed as pastor of the New Universalist Church of Roxbury, Massachusetts. In 1822, he assisted as editor of the Universalist Magazine alongside his great-uncle. Later in May 1838, he served as pastor in Medford, Massachusetts where he helped with the public school system. His most prominent pupils consisted of Thomas Starr King, Edwin Hubbell Chapin and Amory Dwight Mayo. Then in 1854 he became a member of the Massachusetts Board of Education.

Ballou promoted the establishment of seminaries for religious training, something which was at that time opposed by a number of influential Universalists, including his uncle Hosea. He edited or wrote for a number of Universalist publications. In 1843, he replaced Ellery Channing as a member of the Harvard Board of Overseers, and retained this position until 1858.

Privately educated, Ballou was awarded two honorary degrees from Harvard University - the Master of Arts (AM) in 1844, then the Doctor of Divinity (DD) in 1845.

== Beliefs ==
Unlike his great-uncle who believed in ultra-universalism, the viewpoint that all souls would obtain immediate salvation upon death without any postmortem punishment, Ballou believed in universal restorationism, positing the existence of temporary punishment in the afterlife.

Ballou also supported fellowship between ultra-universalists and universal restorationists as shown in the Restorationist Controversy. Jacob Wood had prepared two articles known as Appeal and Declaration in the Vermont universalist paper Christian Repository in December 1822, declaring ultra-universalism and universal restorationism to be "incapable of being reconciled together" and only universal restorationism to be just. Ballou in response published an editorial against Wood's articles in the Universalist Magazine, accusing Christian universal restorationists Edward Turner and Paul Dean of creating this controversy out of jealousy of his great-uncle Hosea Ballou's work.

== Writings ==
- The Ancient History of Universalism, from the Time of the Apostles to the Fifth General Council (1829)
- A Collection of Psalms and Hymns for the Use of Universalist Societies and Families (1837)
- "Review of the Denomination of Universalists in the United States," Universalist Expositor (1839)
- Counsel and Encouragement: Discourses on the Conduct of Life (1866)
