= Sam Shackleton =

Scottish folk musician

Sam Shackleton, also known as Sorley the Bard, is a Scottish folk musician, singer-songwriter, and clawhammer banjoist from Stirling. Based in Edinburgh, he records traditional trans-Atlantic folk music and original tracks.

Shackleton has a research master's degree in Scottish Ethnology from the School of Scottish Studies, specializing in folklore and ethnomusicology.

He released his debut album Causeway Recordings in July 2022. In September 2025, he self-released his second album, Scottish Cowboy Ballads & Early American Folk Songs, which received positive reviews for its blend of American traditional music and Scottish identity.
