= Phebe A. Hanaford =

American poet

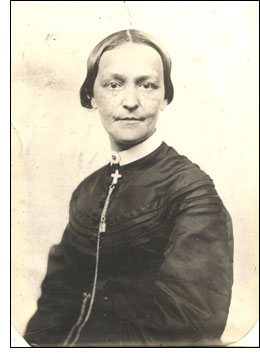
- Born: Phebe Ann Coffin; May 6, 1829; Siasconset, Massachusetts, U.S.
- Died: June 2, 1921 (aged 92); Rochester, New York, U.S.
- Other name: Phebe Ann Hanaford
- Occupations: Minister and writer

Signature
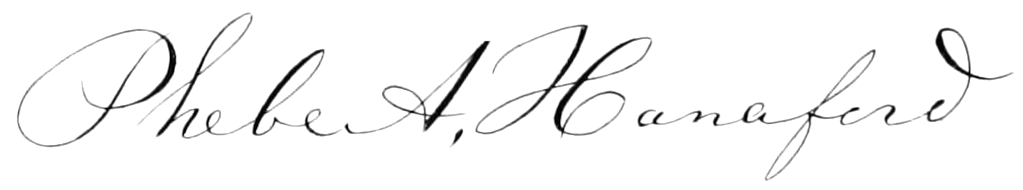

Phebe Ann Hanaford (née Coffin; May 6, 1829 — June 2, 1921) was an American Universalist minister and biographer who was active in championing universal suffrage and women's rights. She was the first woman ordained as a Universalist minister in New England and the first woman to serve as chaplain to the Connecticut General Assembly.

== Life ==
=== Early life and education ===
Phebe Ann Coffin was born on May 6, 1829, in Siasconset on Nantucket Island in Massachusetts to Phebe Ann (Barnard) Coffin, who died a month later) and George W. Coffin, a shipowner and a merchant. Phebe's father remarried the following year, to Emmeline Cartwright; from this union, Phebe gained an older step-brother and seven younger half-siblings. The Coffins were a Quaker family descended from the early Nantucket European settlers Tristram Coffin, Peter Foulger, and Mary Morrill; further back, her ancestry traces to Degory Priest, the Mayflower pilot.

She received an advanced education both at home and in public and private schools on Nantucket, studying math and Latin at home. She left school at the age of 17 to care for her paternal grandmother.

=== Career ===
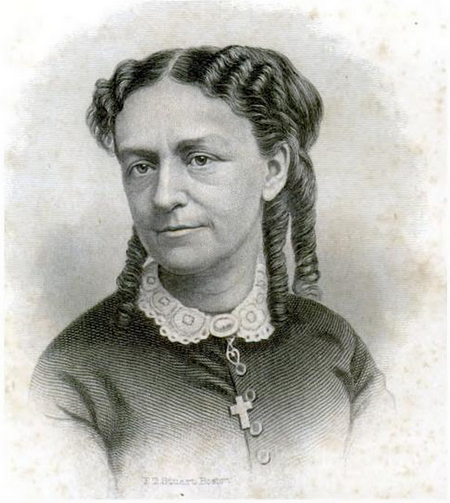
Hanaford in 1893

At the age of 20, she began teaching school in Siasconset, Massachusetts. In 1849, she married Joseph H. Hanaford, a physician who was also a teacher. They had two children, Florence and Howard. In 1857, the couple moved to the mainland, eventually settling in Reading, Massachusetts.

During the Civil War, Hanaford become an abolitionist. She was an active suffragist as well, and became a member of the American Equal Rights Association, which advocated for both black and female suffrage. She spoke at suffrage meetings at the state and national levels and served as vice president of the Association for the Advancement of Women in 1874.

Hanaford turned to preaching and writing, authoring 14 books over lifetime. The first of these, Lucretia the Quakeress (1853) was inspired by the life of a famous cousin, the abolitionist and women's rights activist Lucretia Coffin Mott. Another of her books, Life of Abraham Lincoln (1865), was the first biography of Lincoln published after his assassination. It sold well, reaching 20,000 copies. She was also a member of the Revising Committee of 26 women who produced commentary for The Woman's Bible.

In the same period, Hanaford joined the Universalist Church of America, which included many members who advocated equality for women. From 1866 to 1868, Hanaford edited two periodicals, one of which was The Myrtle, a Universalist Church Sunday school magazine. With the encouragement of suffragist Olympia Brown, America's first ordained Universalist woman minister, she began studying for the ministry. In 1868, she was ordained a pastor of the Universalist Church and accepted a post at a church in Waltham, Massachusetts. She was the first woman ordained in the church in both the state of Massachusetts and New England, and the third to be ordained in America.

In 1870, she moved to a new position at a Universalist Church in New Haven, Connecticut, where her annual salary was $2000. She was also appointed chaplain to the Connecticut General Assembly, the first woman ever to hold that position.

In 1874, she was appointed pastor of the First Universalist Church in New Jersey. She remained there for three years, leaving ultimately due to controversies over her views on women's rights and her personal life. She formed a new congregation, the Second Universalist Church of Jersey City, and preached out of a public hall for several years.

During the 1870s, Hanaford toured New England and some of the Mid-Atlantic and West, giving lectures and sermons on a range of reform issues, including temperance. She reportedly had an exceptional speaking voice, described as resembling "a silver bell".

In 1884, she returned to New Haven to be pastor of a new congregation there, the Second Universalist Church. By 1891, she had moved to New York City, and from 1896 to 1898 she was a member of the New Century Study Circle and Society for Political Study. From 1901 to 1906, she was a vice president of the women's literary club Sorosis and president of the Women's Press Club, where she was a charter member since its 1888 founding.

Hanaford was friends with the self-taught sculptor Joanna Quiner, who depicted her in a portrait bust currently in the collection of the Beverly Historical Society in Beverly, Massachusetts. Hanaford, in turn, penned a biographical sketch of Quiner, and composed two sonnets inspired by the sculptor and her work.

=== Personal life ===
The same year that she was ordained, Hanaford separated from her husband, though they never officially divorced, and took her children with her. She began living with a woman named Ellen Miles, a situation that caused controversy in her first New Jersey congregation, which referred to Miles as the "minister's wife". There was resentment over Miles assisting Hanaford in certain official duties, including philanthropic disbursements. Church officials first tried to pressure Hanaford to leave by threatening a salary cut from $2500 to $1500. When Hanaford accepted the cut, church officials then demanded that Hanaford dismiss Miles. When Hanaford refused, the congregation voted not to renew Hanaford's contract. Hanaford then left to start the Second Universalist Church, where Ellen Miles ran the Sunday School.

Although the nature of Hanaford's relationship with Miles is uncertain, their letters testify to a "deep friendship". They remained together for 44 years until Miles' death in 1914.

=== Death ===
In 1914, Hanaford departed New York City for Rochester, New York, where she died on June 2, 1921, at the age of 92 despite her dream of living to 100. She left a brief unpublished memoir of her early life, Old Time School Days in Nantucket.

== Books ==
- Lucretia the Quakeress (1853)
- Chimes of Peace and Union (1861, with Mary Trask Webber)
- Life of Abraham Lincoln (1865)
- The Soldier's Daughter (1867)
- Life of George Peabody (1871)
- Women of the Century (1876)
- Daughters of America (1882)
- Heart of Siasconset (1891)
