= Edwin Hubbell Chapin =

American poet (1814–1880)

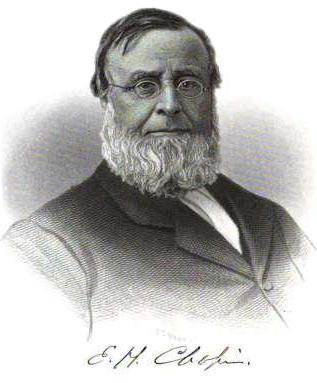
Edwin Hubbell Chapin

Edwin Hubbell Chapin (December 29, 1814 – 1880) was an American preacher and editor of the Christian Leader. He was also a poet, responsible for the poem Burial at Sea, which was the origin of a famous folk song, Bury Me Not on the Lone Prairie.

== Early years and education ==
Chapin was born in Union Village, Washington County, New York. He completed his formal education in a seminary at Bennington, Vermont. At the age of twenty-four, after a course of theological study, he was invited to take charge of the pulpit of the Universalist Society of Richmond, Virginia, and was ordained as a pastor in 1838. Two years afterward, he moved to Charlestown, Massachusetts, and in 1840 he accepted the pastorate of the School Street Society, in Boston. In 1848 he settled in New York as pastor of the Church of the Divine Paternity, later the Fourth Universalist Society in the City of New York, when the church was located on Broadway. There he served for over thirty years, drawing crowds of almost 2,000 each Sunday. Under his leadership, a new edifice was erected on the corner of 5th Avenue and 45th Street, and dedicated on the 3rd day of December, 1866.

== Oratorical works ==
Chapin became widely known as an orator and author of works including the Crown of Thorns, Discourses on the Lord's Prayer, Characters of the Gospel, illustrating phases of the present day, Moral Aspects of City Life, and Humanity in the City. He spoke at Frankfort-on-the-Main, before the World's Peace Convention in 1850; at the Banquet for Lajos Kossuth; at the Publishers' Association Festival, and at the opening of the New York Crystal Palace. He touched upon ideas of American patriotism in his oration at the New York Crystal Palace on July 4, 1854

== Poetry ==
He was the author of the poem Ocean Burial, which was put to music by George N. Allen. The song which it became was published widely. It became a sailor's song and also the beginnings for another song, Bury Me Not on the Lone Prairie. He wrote the poem in his youth and it was published in June 1839 in The Universalist Union and September 1839 in Poe's Southern Literary Messenger.

== Society ==
He was a trustee of Bellevue Medical College and Hospital, and a member of: the State Historical Society, the beneficent society called the Independent Order of Odd Fellows, and the prestigious Century Club, composed of "authors, artists, and amateurs of letters and the fine arts. In 1854 he was elected into the National Academy of Design as an Honorary member.

== Death ==
He died in Pigeon Cove, a village of Rockport, Massachusetts, survived by two sons, Frederic H. Chapin and Dr. Sidney H. Chapin, and one daughter, Marion Chapin Davison. The Chapin Memorial Church at Oneonta, New York was dedicated to him in 1894. A chasm in the rocky coast near his home in Pigeon Cove is named Chapin's Gully where Chapin often practiced his orations and swam.

== Recognition ==
He was one of the chief actors in what was called the "Broad Church Movement". Harvard College conferred an honorary D.D. upon Chapin in 1856.

== Selected works ==
- The Crown of Thorns: A Token for the Sorrowing (1847)
- Duties of Young Women (1849)
- Moral Aspects of City Life: A Series of Lectures (1853)
- Humanity in the City (1854)
- Living Words (1860)
- Discourses on the Lord's Prayer (1872)
- Lessons of Faith and Life: Discourses (1877)
- God's Requirements and Other Sermons (1881)
