= Thomas Baldwin Thayer =

American theologian (1812–1886)

Thomas Baldwin Thayer (September 10, 1812 in Boston, Massachusetts – February 12, 1886 in Roxbury, Massachusetts) was the leading Universalist theologian in the late nineteenth century.

== Biography ==
Thayer entered Harvard at an early age, but left after the first year and began to teach, at the same time studying divinity. He was ordained in 1832, and from 1833 to 1845 was pastor of the 1st Universalist Society in Lowell, Massachusetts, where his ministry was important in the history of Universalism in New England. During the crusade against Universalism from 1840 to 1842, he established and edited in its defense the Star of Bethlehem, and with his co-worker, Abel C. Thomas, wrote the Lowell Tracts in the same interest.

Thayer was called to a pastorate in Brooklyn, New York, in 1845, where he edited the Golden Rule in the interest of the fraternity of Oddfellows. After six years he returned to his old parish in Lowell. In 1859 he became pastor of the Shawmut Avenue Church, Boston, which charge he resigned in 1867. In 1862 Thayer assumed the editorship of the Universalist Quarterly, which contains some of his most important literary work. He continued these labors, with an interval of travel in Europe and the East, until his last illness.

He received the degree of D.D. from Tufts college in 1865, and he was for many years on the board of overseers of Harvard. Thayer was a biblical scholar of rare breadth, and a pioneer in Universalist literature.

== Works ==
He wrote much verse that has never been collected. He published:

- Bible Class Assistant (Boston, 1840)
- Christianity against infidelity: or, the truth of the gospel history (Boston, 1833; 1836; enlarged edition, Cincinnati, 1849)
- History of the Origin of Endless Punishment (1855)
- Theology of Universalism (1862)
- Over the River (1864)
