= Sarah Carter Edgarton Mayo =

American poet (1819–1848)

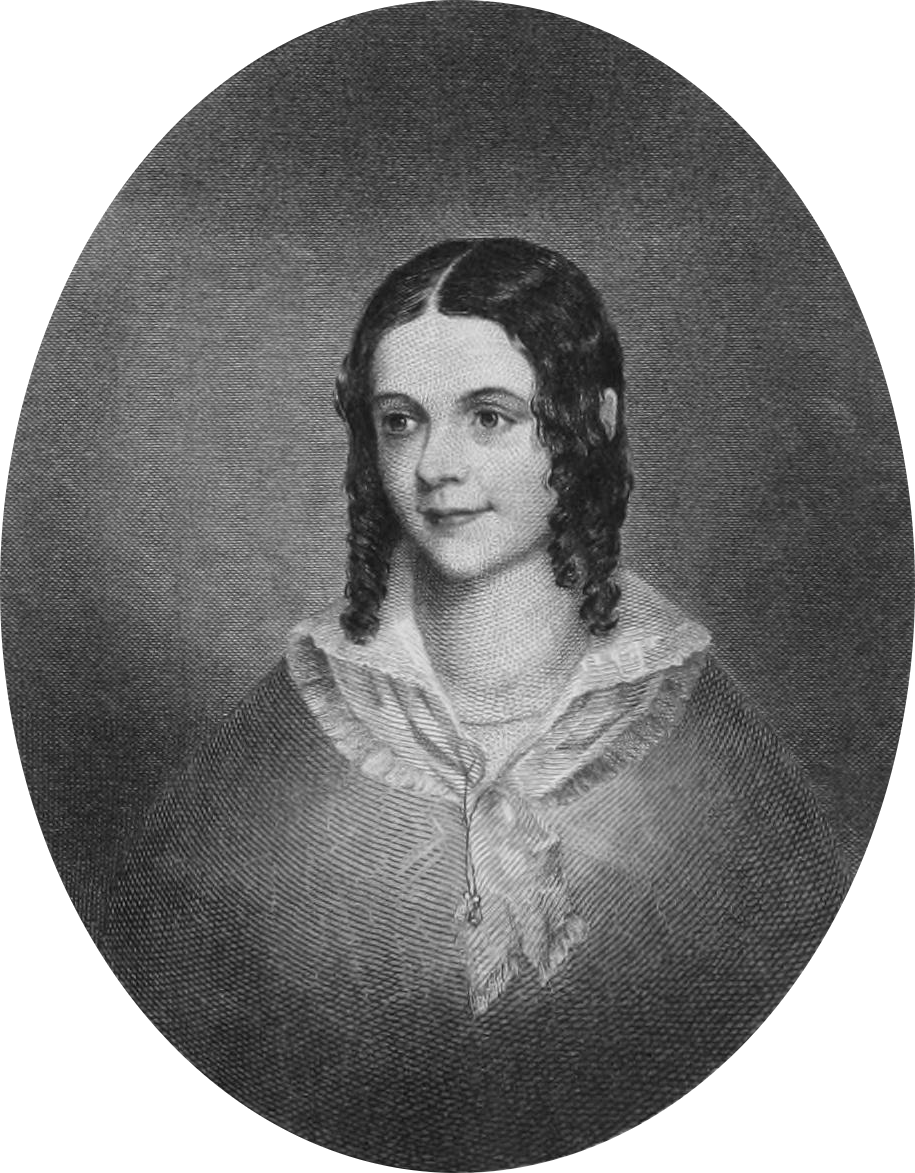

Sarah Carter Edgarton Mayo (born in Shirley, Massachusetts, 17 March 1819; died in Gloucester, Massachusetts, 9 July 1848) was an American author and editor.

== Biography ==
She did well in the district school, and attended Westford Academy for a semester. She taught herself French and Latin. To offset reduced income from her father's business, she began to contribute to journals at the age of 16, and at 17 she joined the Universalist Church, to which her parents, manufacturer Joseph Edgarton and his second wife Mehitable Whitcomb, also belonged.

She edited The Rose of Sharon, an annual, from 1840 until 1848, and was an associate editor of The Universalist and Ladies' Repository, a monthly magazine in Boston, from 1839 until 1842. Between 1836 and 1844, she published The Palfreys, Ellen Clifford, and Memoirs of Mrs. Julia W. Scott, and compiled The Poetry of Women, The Flower Vase, Spring Flowers, The Floral Fortune Teller, Language and Poetry of Flowers and Fables of Flora. She associated with the writer Charlotte Ann Fillebrown Jerauld.

With her earnings, she was able to support her family through its financial troubles and also put her younger brother, John Marshall, through Harvard University. Her brother taught her German, and obtained books from Harvard for her. He graduated in 1847, and began work on starting a magazine, but died that year.

Sarah Edgarton married Amory Dwight Mayo in 1846, and the couple moved to Gloucester. They had a daughter, Carloine, in September 1847. Edgarton's health deteriorated afterward, and she died in July 1848.
