= Hosea Ballou =

American Universalist clergyman and theological writer

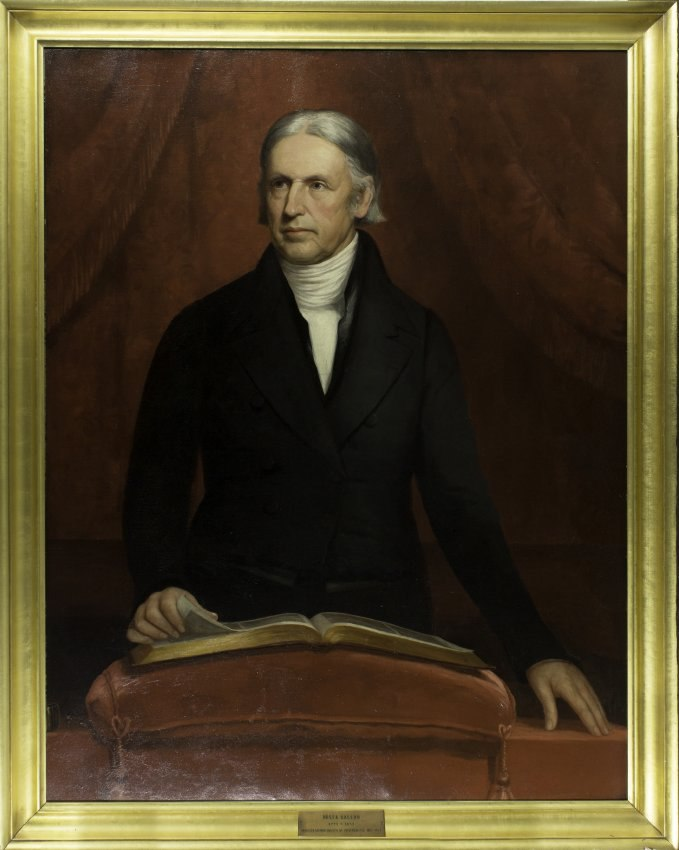
- portrait by Henry Cheever Pratt
- Born: 30 April 1771; Richmond
- Died: 7 June 1852; Boston
- Occupations: Theologian, writer
- Children: Maturin Murray Ballou
- Mother: Lydia Harris

Hosea Ballou D.D. (April 30, 1771 – June 7, 1852) was an American Universalist clergyman and theological writer.

Originally a Baptist, he converted to Universalism in 1789. He preached in a number of towns in Vermont, New Hampshire, and Massachusetts. From 1817, he was pastor of the Second Universalist Church of Boston. He wrote a number of influential theological works, as well as hymns, essays and sermons, and edited two Universalist journals. Ballou has been called one of the fathers of American Universalism.

== Life and career ==
Hosea Ballou was born in Richmond, New Hampshire, to a family of Huguenot origin. The family claimed to be of Anglo-Norman heritage. The son of Maturin Ballou, a Baptist minister, Hosea Ballou was self-educated, and devoted himself early on to the ministry. In 1789 he converted to Universalism, and in 1794 became pastor of a congregation in Dana, Massachusetts. Ballou was also a high-ranking freemason, who attained the position of Junior Grand Warden of the Grand Lodge of New Hampshire in 1811.

Ballou preached at Barnard, Vermont, and surrounding towns in 1801–1807; at Portsmouth, New Hampshire, in 1807–1815; at Salem, Massachusetts, in 1815–1817; and, as pastor of the Second Universalist Church of Boston, from December 1817 until his death there. He was buried at the Mount Auburn Cemetery.

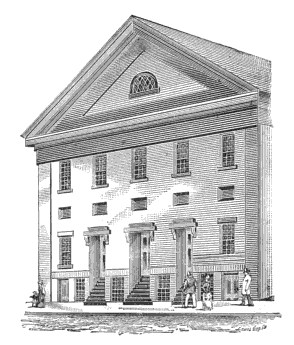
Second Universalist Church, School Street, Boston; built 1817

He founded and edited The Universalist Magazine (1819–later called The Trumpet), and The Universalist Expositor (1831–later The Universalist Quarterly Review), and wrote about 10,000 sermons as well as many hymns, essays and polemic theological works. He is best known for Notes on the Parables (1804), A Treatise on Atonement (1805) and Examination of the Doctrine of a Future Retribution (1834). These works mark him as the principal American expositor of Universalism.

Ballou married Ruth Washburn; children included Maturin Murray Ballou. He is the grand-uncle of Hosea Ballou II, the first president of Tufts University.

== Beliefs ==
Ballou has been called the "father of American Universalism," along with John Murray, who founded the first Universalist church in America. Ballou, sometimes called an "Ultra Universalist," differed from Murray in that he divested Universalism of every trace of Calvinism, and opposed legalism and trinitarian views. As he wrote, "Real happiness is cheap enough, yet how dearly we pay for its counterfeit."

Ballou also preached that those forms of Christianity that emphasized God as wrathful in turn hardened the hearts of their believers:

It is well known, and will be acknowledged by every candid person, that the human heart is capable of becoming soft, or hard; kind, or unkind; merciful or unmerciful, by education and habit. On this principle we contend, that the infernal torments, which false religion has placed in the future world, and which ministers have, with an overflowing zeal, so constantly held up to the people, and urged with all their learning and eloquence, have tended so to harden the hearts of the professors of this religion, that they have exercised, toward their fellow creatures, a spirit of enmity, which but too well corresponds with the relentless cruelty of their doctrine, and the wrath which they have imagined to exist in our heavenly Father. By having such an example constantly before their eyes, they have become so transformed into its image, that, whenever they have had the power, they have actually executed a vengeance on men and women, which evinced that the cruelty of their doctrine had overcome the native kindness and compassion of the human heart.

== Hymns ==
In 1844 Ballou published A Collection of Psalms and Hymns for the Use of Universalist Societies and Families. None of his hymns is included in the Unitarian hymnal Singing The Living Tradition (1993), but his thoughts appear in Reading #705.

== See also ==
- New Hampshire Historical Marker No. 59: Hosea Ballou
- Universalist Church of America
