= List of suffragists from Georgia (U.S. state) =

This is a list of suffragists, suffrage groups and others associated with the cause of women's suffrage in the U.S. state of Georgia.

== Groups ==
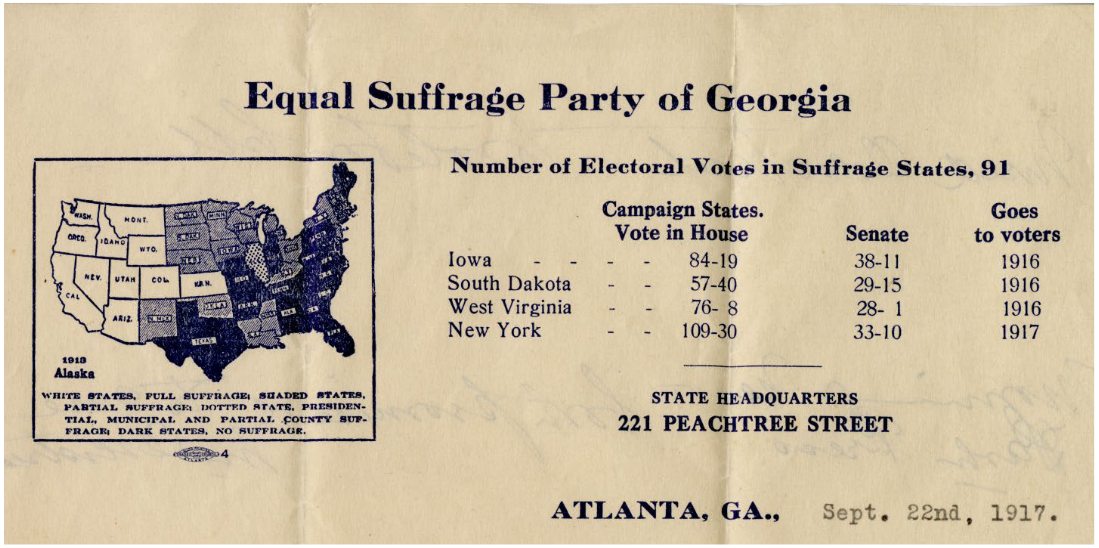
Equal Suffrage Party of Georgia 1917 letterhead

- Atlanta Equal Suffrage League.
- Augusta Equal Suffrage Association.
- Business People's Suffrage Association.
- Chatham County Branch of the Equal Suffrage Party of Georgia.
- DeKalb Equal Suffrage Party.
- Equal Suffrage Party of Augusta.
- Equal Suffrage Party of Georgia.
- Fulton Equal Suffrage Party.
- Georgia Men's League for Woman Suffrage.
- Georgia Woman Equal Suffrage League, formed in 1913.
- Georgia Woman Suffrage Association (GWSA).
- Georgia Young People's Suffrage Association, created in 1913.
- Muscogee Equal Franchise League, formed in 1913.
- National Woman's Party of Georgia, formed in 1917.
- National Association of Colored Women (NACW).
- Savannah Woman Suffrage Association, created in November 1914.

== Suffragists ==
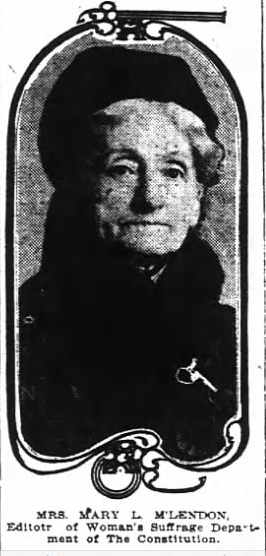
Mary Latimer McLendon in the Atlanta Constitution, 15 June 1913

- Mary Harris Armor.
- Rose Ashby.
- Janie Porter Barrett.
- Ruth Buckholz.
- Beatrice Carleton.
- Beatrice Castleton (Atlanta).
- Rebecca Latimer Felton.
- Leonard Grossman.
- Will Harben (Dalton).
- Walter B. Hill (Macon).
- Lugenia Burns Hope (Atlanta).
- Helen Augusta Howard (Columbus).
- Jane Judge (Savannah).
- Lucy Laney (Augusta).
- Adella Hunt Logan.
- Emma T. Martin.
- Mary Latimer McLendon (Atlanta).
- Emily C. McDougald.
- Mary McCurdy.
- Mary Raoul Millis.
- Eléonore Raoul (Atlanta).
- Jennie Hart Sibley (Union Point).
- Frances C. Swift (Atlanta)
- Frances Smith Whiteside.
- Mamie George S. Williams (Savannah).

=== Politicians supporting women's suffrage ===
- Hugh Dorsey.
- William J. Harris.
- John L. Hopkins.
- Livingston Mimms (Atlanta).

== Places ==
- De Give's Grand Opera House.

== Suffragists who campaigned in Georgia ==
- Jane Addams.
- Beulah Amidon.
- Susan B. Anthony.
- Henry Blackwell.
- Lillie Devereaux Blake.
- Ida Porter Boyer.
- Madeline McDowell Breckinridge.
- Carrie Chapman Catt.
- Jean Gordon.
- Kate M. Gordon.
- Josephine K. Henry.
- Elsie Hill.
- Solon H. Jacobs.
- Belle Kearney.
- Catherine Kenny.
- Harriet Burton Laidlaw.
- Lide A. Meriwether.
- Helen Ring Robinson.
- Anna Howard Shaw.
- Mabel Vernon.
- Elizabeth Upham Yates.
- Virginia D. Young.

== Anti-suffragists in Georgia ==
Groups

- Georgia Association Opposed to Woman Suffrage, formed in 1914 in Macon.

People

- Warren Candler.
- Dolly Blount Lamar.
- Caroline Patterson (Macon).
- Mildred Lewis Rutherford.
- Hoke Smith.

== See also ==
- Timeline of women's suffrage in Georgia (U.S. state)
- Women's suffrage in Georgia (U.S. state)
- Women's suffrage in states of the United States
- Women's suffrage in the United States.
