= Timeline of women's suffrage in Georgia (U.S. state) =

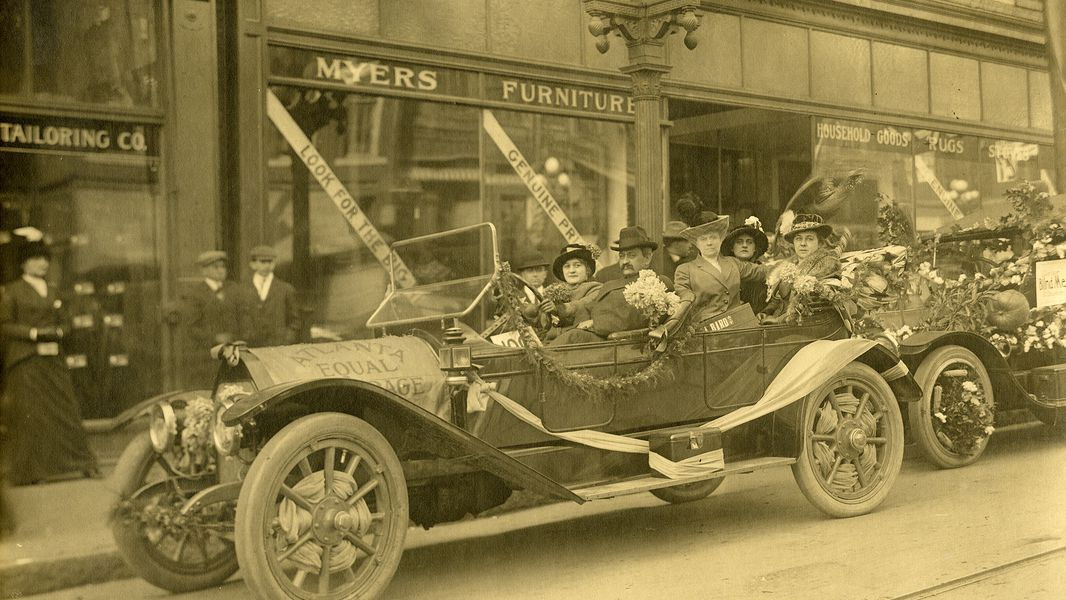
Atlanta Equal Suffrage group in parade in Atlanta, Georgia in 1913

This is a timeline of women's suffrage in Georgia. Women's suffrage in Georgia started in earnest with the formation of the Georgia Woman Suffrage Association (GWSA) in 1892. GWSA helped bring the first large women's rights convention to the South in 1895 when the National American Woman's Suffrage Association (NAWSA) held their convention in Atlanta. GWSA was the main source of activism behind women's suffrage until 1913. In that year, several other groups formed including the Georgia Young People's Suffrage Association (GYPSA) and the Georgia Men's League for Woman Suffrage. In 1914, the Georgia Association Opposed to Women's Suffrage (GAOWS) was formed by anti-suffragists. Despite the hard work by suffragists in Georgia, the state continued to reject most efforts to pass equal suffrage. In 1917, Waycross, Georgia allowed women to vote in primary elections and in 1919 Atlanta granted the same. Georgia was the first state to reject the Nineteenth Amendment. Women in Georgia still had to wait to vote statewide after the Nineteenth Amendment was ratified on August 26, 1920. Native American and African American women had to wait even longer to vote. Georgia ratified the Nineteenth Amendment in 1970.

== 19th century ==
=== 1880s ===
1887

- Georgia passes a "cumulative" poll tax, where individuals had to pay all back taxes to the poll in order to vote.

=== 1890s ===
1890

- Helen Augusta Howard creates a small women's suffrage organization, the first in Georgia, which would later become the Georgia Woman Suffrage Association (GWSA).

1894

- The Equal Suffrage League of Atlanta forms as a chapter of GWSA.

1895

- January: The National American Woman Suffrage Association (NAWSA) holds their annual convention in Atlanta.
- February 4: Susan B. Anthony speaks at Atlanta University.
- The weekly newspaper, the Sunny South from Atlanta, endorses women's suffrage.

1896

- Mary Latimer McLendon creates the Atlanta chapter of GWSA.

1899

- November: GWSA holds their first convention at Atlanta.

== 20th century ==
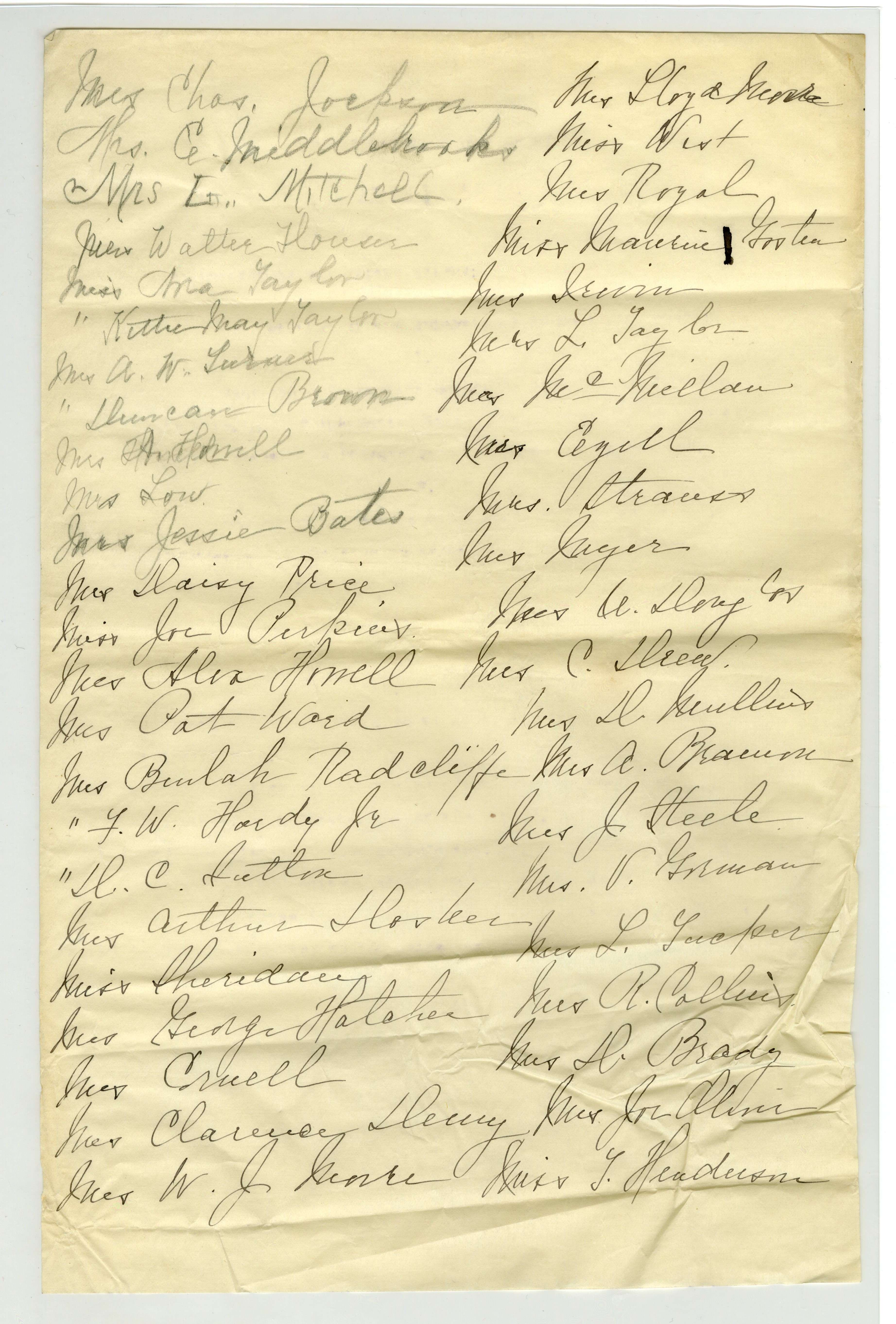
Petition of the Women of Georgia for a Women's Suffrage Amendment, 12 June 1913

=== 1900s ===
1900

- The Georgia Federation of Labor endorses women's suffrage.
- Georgia creates white primaries.

1901

- November: GWSA holds their annual convention.

1902

- Women in Atlanta petition the local government to vote in municipal elections, but they are rejected.
- November: GWSA holds their annual convention in Atlanta at the Universalist Church.

1903

- GWSA holds the state convention with Kate M. Gordon as a speaker.

1905

- McLendon of the GWSA reaches out to the Georgia chapter of the Women's Christian Temperance Union (WCTU), but they are not interested in adding women's suffrage as a plank.

1906

- The state suffrage convention celebrated the life of Susan B. Anthony.

1907

- The state legislature passes a law that only men of "good character" may vote and all poll taxes must be paid six months in advance of the election.

1908

- Mary Latimer McLendon is invited to speak on women's rights at the Georgia Agricultural Association.
- The Georgia Prohibition Party endorses women's suffrage.

1909

- Women in Atlanta petition for the right to vote in local elections, but their petition is rejected.

=== 1910s ===
1913

- The Georgia Woman Equal Suffrage League is created.
- The Georgia Young People's Suffrage Association (GYPSA) is formed.
- The Georgia Men's League for Woman Suffrage is created.
- March 3: Members of GYPSA march in the Woman Suffrage Parade.
- July: The Atlanta Constitution creates a woman suffrage department.
- November: The Student's Club of Columbus sponsors a lecture by Jean Margaret Gordon.
- December: Suffragists enter three cars in the "auto floral parade."

1914

- The Equal Suffrage Party of Georgia is organized.
- The Georgia chapter of WCTU is more open to women's suffrage at their convention.
- Spring: The Georgia Association Opposed to Woman Suffrage is formed.
- March: Women's suffrage rally is held in Atlanta with Jane Addams as a featured speaker.
- May 2: McLendon speaks on the steps of the State Capitol and members of GWSA sell copies of the Woman's Journal.
- June 25: Representative Barry Wright introduces an equal suffrage amendment in the House of the Georgia General Assembly.
- June 30: J. W. Bush introduces a similar measure in the Georgia Senate.
- July: State suffrage convention held at Hotel Ansley.
- December: Suffragists enter the Advertizing Men's Parade, where they win three prizes.

1915

- March: The Atlanta Equal Suffrage Association hosts a suffrage program including a speech by Rebecca Latimer Felton and a showing of Your Girl and Mine.
- August: The Georgia legislature votes against women's suffrage.
- November: State suffrage convention is held in Atlanta.
- November: Suffrage parade is held, with Eleanor Raoul leading on horseback.
- December: Suffrage rally held in Atlanta with Jean Margaret Gordon speaking.

1916

- Equal suffrage measures are introduced in both houses of the Georgia legislature, but do not pass.
- February: Suffragists get 10,000 signers on a petition to the city council of Atlanta to support municipal suffrage.
- October 28: The Equal Suffrage Party of Georgia holds its annual convention in Atlanta.

1917

- Georgia chapter of the National Woman's Party is formed.
- Waycross, Georgia opens municipal primary elections to women.
- July: Women's suffrage is debated in the Georgia legislature, but does not pass.
- November 24: The Equal Suffrage Party of Georgia holds its annual convention in Augusta.

1919

- January 15: The Equal Suffrage Party of Georgia holds its annual convention in Savannah.
- May 3: White women in Atlanta gain the right to vote in municipal primary elections.

=== 1920s ===
1920

- March: The Equal Suffrage Party of Georgia dissolves and forms the League of Women Voters (LWV) of Georgia.
- July 24: Georgia is the first state to reject the Nineteenth Amendment.
- September 8: McLendon and other women attempted to vote and to register to vote, but were turned away.

1921

- The Georgia legislature passed a law allowing women to vote and hold public office.

1922

- White Georgia women are able to vote statewide.

1924

- Native American women are granted citizenship.

=== 1950s ===
1956

- The Georgia LWV changes their bylaws to allow people of any race to join.

=== 1960s ===
1965

- The Voting Rights Act of 1965 removes barriers preventing Black women from voting.

=== 1970s ===
1970

- February 20: Georgia ratifies the Nineteenth Amendment.

== See also ==
- List of Georgia (U.S. state) suffragists
- Women's suffrage in Georgia (U.S. state)
- Women's suffrage in states of the United States
- Women's suffrage in the United States.
