= Women's suffrage in Georgia (U.S. state) =

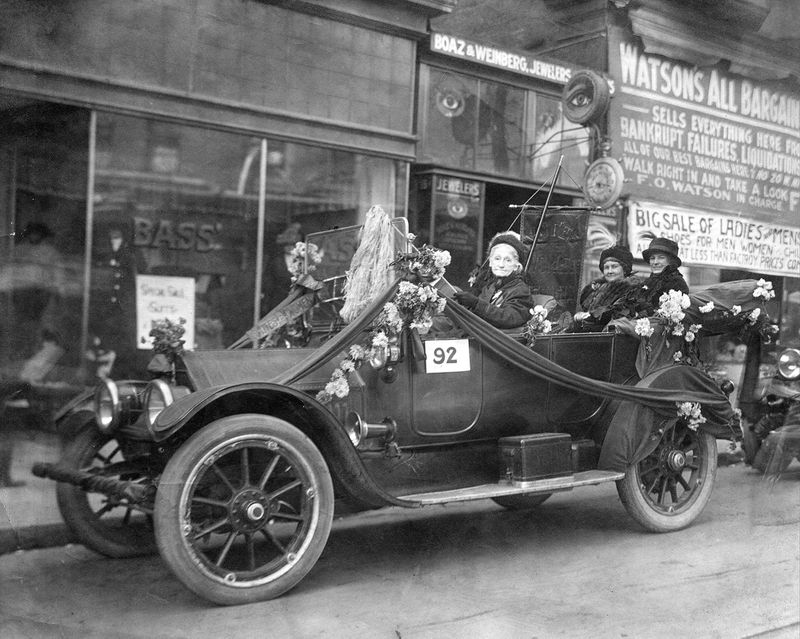
Georgia Woman Civic Suffrage Association in parade in Atlanta, Georgia in 1913. Mary Latimer McLendon is driving.

The first women's suffrage group in Georgia, the Georgia Woman Suffrage Association (GWSA), was formed in 1892 by Helen Augusta Howard. Over time, the group, which focused on "taxation without representation" grew and earned the support of both men and women. Howard convinced the National American Women's Suffrage Association (NAWSA) to hold their first convention outside of Washington, D.C., in 1895. The convention, held in Atlanta, was the first large women's rights gathering in the Southern United States. GWSA continued to hold conventions and raise awareness over the next years. Suffragists in Georgia agitated for suffrage amendments, for political parties to support white women's suffrage and for municipal suffrage. In the 1910s, more organizations were formed in Georgia and the number of suffragists grew. In addition, the Georgia Association Opposed to Woman Suffrage also formed an organized anti-suffrage campaign. Suffragists participated in parades, supported bills in the legislature and helped in the war effort during World War I. In 1917 and 1919, women earned the right to vote in primary elections in Waycross, Georgia and in Atlanta respectively. In 1919, after the Nineteenth Amendment went out to the states for ratification, Georgia became the first state to reject the amendment. When the Nineteenth Amendment became the law of the land, women still had to wait to vote because of rules regarding voter registration. White Georgia women would vote statewide in 1922. Native American women and African-American women had to wait longer to vote. Black women were actively excluded from the women's suffrage movement in the state and had their own organizations. Despite their work to vote, Black women faced discrimination at the polls in many different forms. Georgia finally ratified the Nineteenth Amendment on February 20, 1970.

== Early efforts ==
The first woman's suffrage to group to form in Georgia was the Georgia Woman Suffrage Association (GWSA), founded by a small group of women led by Helen Augusta Howard. GWSA was originally made up of Howard and her relatives. GWSA was formed in Columbus, Georgia, but by 1892, members from outside the city had begun to join, drawing members from the temperance movement in the state. By the end of 1893, GWSA had members in five different Georgia counties. On the outside of envelopes sent from GWSA, the group printed "Taxation without representation is tyranny." GWSA also had the support of some men in Georgia and in 1894, the group shared the opinions of prominent men in support of women's suffrage in a pamphlet. Early on, GWSA was more involved with raising awareness of the issues surrounding women's suffrage and advocating for women's right to vote. Members of GWSA attended the national suffrage convention held by the National American Women's Suffrage Association (NAWSA) in Washington, D.C., in 1894. Howard requested that the next convention be held in Georgia.

In late January 1895, for the first time, NAWSA held their annual convention outside of Washington, D.C. After strong lobbying on behalf of Georgia by Howard, the NAWSA suffragists held that year's convention in Atlanta. This convention was the first large women's right's gatherings in the South. Howard and her sisters funded the convention with their own funds. Georgia suffragist, Mary Latimer McLendon was one of the speakers and Susan B. Anthony was a headliner. The convention featured both male and female speakers and had musical numbers for entertainment. Susan Atkinson and her husband, Governor William Atkinson, attended the convention. The convention was covered by the major newspapers and impressed several women's groups in the South.

After the convention, Frances Cater Swift became the president of GWSA, holding the office for a year. In 1896, McLendon took over as president.

GWSA held the next state suffrage convention in November 1899. At the convention, they decided to lobby the Georgia General Assembly on several women's and human rights issues, not just women's suffrage. The lobbying of GWSA had an effect on several efforts relating to child labor, age of consent laws and more. The work GWSA raised its profile and earned it the support of the State Federation of Labor. Frances A. Griffin, from the GWSA, was also responsible for encouraging the support of the Federation of Labor. There was no state convention in 1900.

In November 1901, GWSA held the state convention at the Universalist Church of Atlanta. Carrie Chapman Catt was a speaker and later she spoke to the Atlanta Woman's Club. After the 1902 convention, women of Atlanta protested not being allowed to vote and earned the support of Mayor Livingston Mims. Suffragists added placards to the polls that read: "Taxpaying women should be allowed to vote in this bond election."

During 1903, Georgia suffragists worked to raise awareness of their cause. They worked at the Woman's Department at the Inter-State Fair in Atlanta, where they could collect names of suffrage supporters and give out suffrage literature. At the 1903 convention, held at the Carnegie Library in Atlanta, Kate M. Gordon spoke about women's suffrage in Louisiana.

In 1905, McLendon attempted to get the Georgia chapter of the Women's Christian Temperance Union (WCTU) to adopt a suffrage plank, but she was unsuccessful. However, WCTU leader, Warren Candler, was against women's suffrage.

GWSA continued to hold yearly conventions. However, they were unable to persuade state legislators to bring up women's suffrage in the General Assembly. In 1908, Georgia suffragists wrote to encourage the delegates for both the Democratic and Republican National Conventions to support a women's suffrage plank in their respective party platforms. The suffragists were successful in getting the Georgia Prohibition Party to support women's suffrage.

In 1909, women of Atlanta lobbied the city government for the municipal vote for women. Women in Atlanta were paying taxes on more than $13,000,000 worth of real estate and personal property. Despite the efforts of women to show that they were being taxed without being represented, the City of Atlanta rejected municipal women's suffrage. Again, women protested their lack of the vote on election day.

== Continuing efforts ==
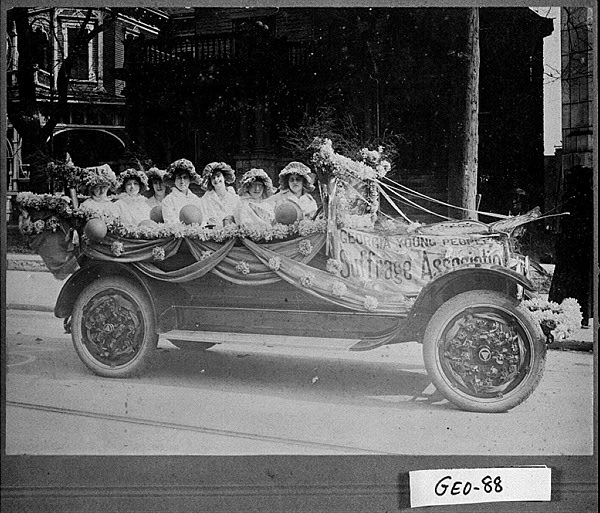
Georgia Young People Suffrage Association with Margaret Koch driving.

The membership of GWSA grew during the 1910s. When Rebecca Latimer Felton joined the group in 1912, it helped bring additional publicity to the suffrage cause in Georgia. Felton became a delegate to the national suffrage convention held in Philadelphia.

The years 1913 and 1914 showed increased interest in women's suffrage in Georgia. The Atlanta Constitution formed a women's suffrage department in July with McLendon in charge. Lawyer for GWSA and later other groups, Leonard Grossman, formed the Georgia Men's League for Woman Suffrage in 1913. The Georgia Young People's Suffrage Association (GYPSA) was formed in 1913 with Ruth Buckholz serving as president. Members of GYPSA marched in the Woman's Suffrage Procession in Washington, D.C., on March 3, 1913. Suffragists also entered three cars in an "auto floral parade" in December of that year. Also in 1913, the Georgia Woman Suffrage League (GWSL) was created in Atlanta with Frances Smith Whiteside as president. This group did not attract women outside of Atlanta, and so the Equal Suffrage Party of Georgia (ESPG) was formed in 1914 and elected Maybelle Stephens Mitchell as its president. This group grew rapidly, with 100 members at first, but growing to around 2,000 by January 1915. Members of ESPG raised money, held parades, contests and plays.

During 1914, around 275 women's suffrage meetings were held across the state in Athens, Atlanta, Bainbridge, Decatur, Macon, and Rome. The Georgia WCTU softened their stance on women's suffrage that year, allowing McLendon to welcome suffragists to their convention. In March 1914, a suffrage rally was held in Atlanta with famous women such as Jane Addams speaking.

Also in 1914, the Georgia Association Opposed to Women's Suffrage (GAOWS) was formed in Macon. Anti-suffragist, James Calloway, gave GAOWS publicity in his Macon newspapers, the Daily-Telegraph and the News. Anti-suffragists began to write broadsides and went after other suffragists publicly, challenging them to debates.

Representative Barry Wright introduced an equal suffrage amendment in the Georgia House on June 25, 1914. On June 30, W. J. Bush introduced a women's suffrage bill to the Georgia Senate. The first women's suffrage speech given in the House happened on July 6 when Whiteside spoke in front of the assembly. On July 7, 1914 more women testified about women's suffrage in front of the Georgia House Constitutional Amendment Committee. Both suffragists and anti-suffragists were on site to present their views and around two hundred women, mostly suffragists, were viewing from the gallery. The suffrage measures did not pass.

Suffragists hosted a large parade as part of the Harvest Festival Celebration in 1915. The parade was led by Eleanor Raoul on horseback and following her, suffragists riding in Eastern Victory, a car once owned by Anna Howard Shaw. The parade had a marching band and around two hundred marchers, all wearing yellow sashes. After the marchers, came female college students wearing caps and gowns who were followed by two-hundred decorated cars. Despite the size of the parade, the suffragists had almost no help controlling traffic from the Atlanta Police Department. The police did help significantly with the harvest parade which was taking place at the same time.

In February 1916, suffrage groups worked to attain 10,000 signatures on a petition in support of municipal women's suffrage in Atlanta, but were unsuccessful in getting the vote. Raoul tried to expand the influence of ESPG by campaigning in rural areas in 1916. Other suffragists, including the president of ESPG, Emily McDougald, felt that rural women were "ignorant and hopeless."

Women formed a Georgia branch of the National Woman's Party (NWP) in 1917. However, the group was not very popular in the state because of the militant tactics the national leaders used to fight for women's suffrage. Beatrice Carleton of the Georgia NWP testified before the Georgia legislature when they were considering equal suffrage measures in July 1917. Rose Ashby from GWSA also testified. Anti-suffragists were also on hand to oppose women's suffrage and the bills did not pass. Though women were not making progress with suffrage state-wide, the city of Waycross, Georgia did approve women to vote in municipal primary elections.

During World War I, suffragists and anti-suffragists alike aided in the war effort. GWSL president, Whiteside, described the work of suffragists during the war. Women in Georgia made garments for soldiers and raised money for the war and the Red Cross. Suffragists were involved with the Women's Council of National Defense, with McLendon acting as president. The work of suffragists to aid the war effort was noticed by the press in Georgia, with the Columbus Enquirer Sun praising their efforts.

== Rejection, ratification and challenges ==
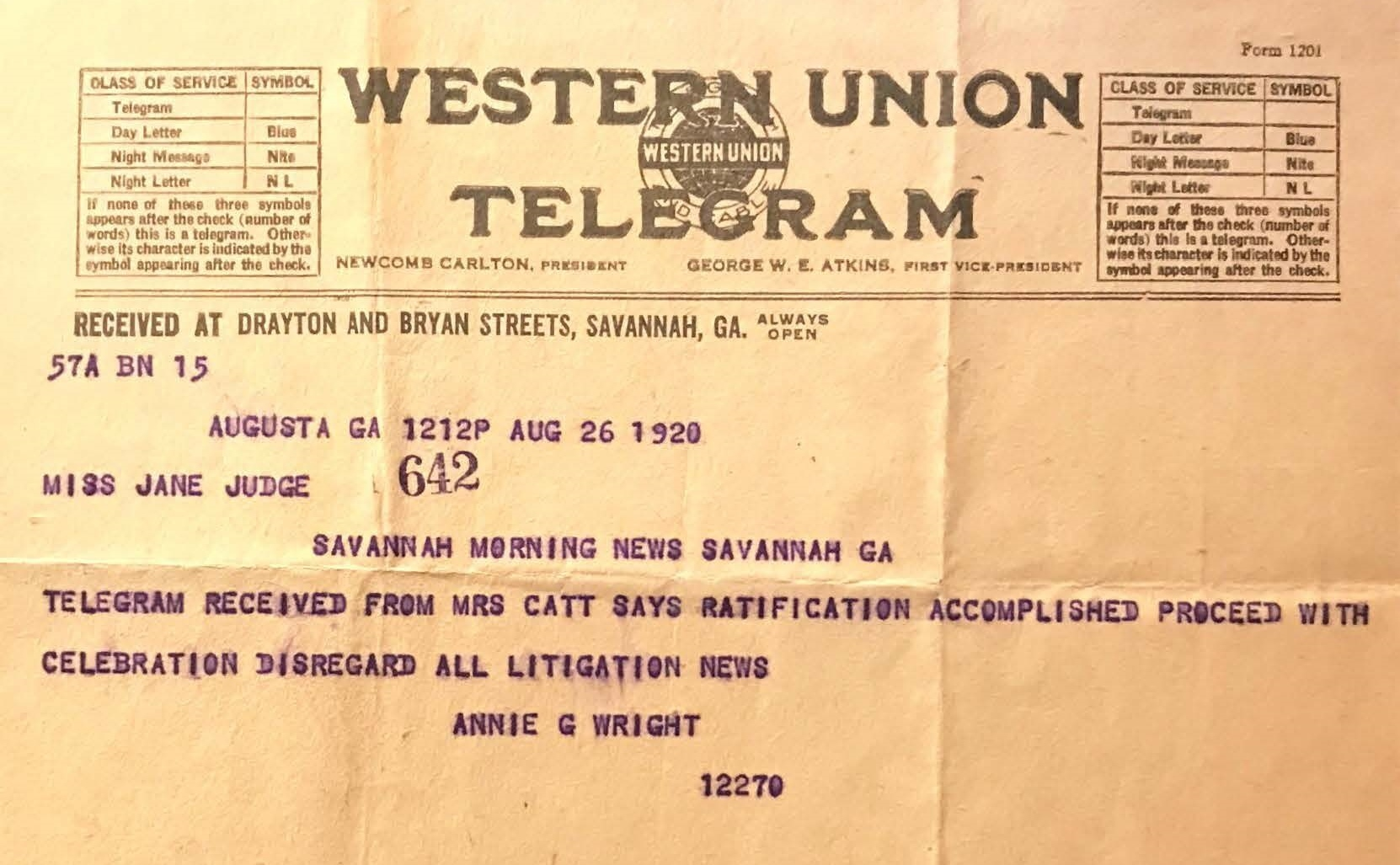
Western Union telegram to Jane Judge of Georgia from Annie G. Wright on passage of the Nineteenth Amendment, August 26, 1920

Women in Atlanta finally achieved municipal suffrage in 1919. Mrs. A. G. Helmer, in charge of the Fulton County Suffrage Association, discovered that the city council of Atlanta was supportive of women's suffrage. The city voted on May 3 to allow women to vote in municipal primaries on a vote of twenty-four to one. Four thousand women registered to vote.

On July 1, 1919, the Georgia House and Senate submitted bills to ratify the Nineteenth Amendment. Representative J. B. Jackson amended his own bill in the House to read "rejects" the amendment, so if the bill left the committee, it would be a rejection, not an endorsement. Suffragists testified in the House, with McLendon questioning Jackson's introduction of support and then subsequent rejection of the federal equal suffrage amendment. Mabel Vernon criticized the rejection the amendment and said it would look bad for the Democratic Party which had endorsed women's suffrage. Other suffragists pointed out that it was short-sighted of Georgia to reject women's suffrage. Anti-suffragist Mildred Rutherford was the only one to speak against women's suffrage. By July 7, members of the House tried to table Jackson's rejection bill and the bill in Senate faced the same fate later in the month. Eventually the entire House voted on the bill and Georgia rejected the federal amendment on July 24 118–29. Georgia was the first state to reject the amendment. After Georgia rejected the Nineteenth Amendment, anti-suffragist, Dolly Blount Lamar traveled to other states that had not yet ratified the amendment to lobby against its passage.

After the Nineteenth Amendment was ratified and became the law of the land, Georgia still did not allow all of its women to vote. McLendon and other suffragists attempted to vote in the 1920 primary election, but were not allowed. Georgia had a rule that required voters to register to vote six months prior to an election. Because of this rule, women were not allowed to vote in the 1920 presidential election. McLendon appealed the case to the Secretary of State, Bainbridge Colby, saying her rights under the Nineteenth Amendment were violated. Colby didn't help, and neither did other state officials. In March 1920, the Equal Suffrage Party of Georgia dissolved and formed the Georgia League of Women Voters. In 1921, the Georgia General Assembly passed a law that would allow women to vote and hold public office. White women voted statewide in 1922.

However, African-American and Native American women were still excluded from the vote in Georgia. By 1900, because of the cumulative poll tax, only around 10 percent of Black men were able to vote. Black voters had also been barred from voting in primary elections in 1900.

Georgia finally ratified the Nineteenth Amendment on February 20, 1970.

== African-Americans and women's suffrage in Georgia ==
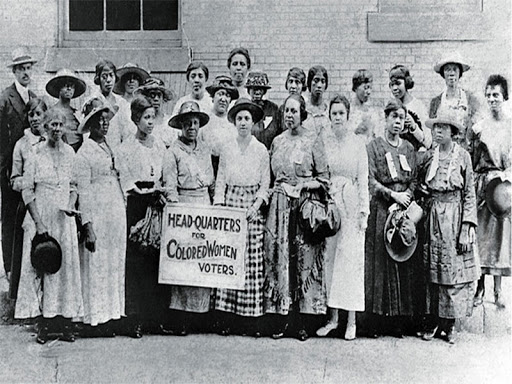
Headquarters for Colored Women Voters, Colored Women Voters League, Georgia c. 1920

Suffragists in Georgia used issues of race to advance their own cause of women's suffrage. Rebecca Latimer Felton herself was an advocate of lynching even while she was an ardent suffragist for white women's right to vote. Many white suffragists in Georgia believed that if they got the vote, it would help maintain white supremacy and they used this idea to promote their cause. Emily C. McDougald wrote to the state legislation and said, "Everyone knows that the enfranchisement of the women of the south will enormously increase white supremacy... In Georgia there are 110,590 more white women than negro women." Suffragists like Felton argued that white women needed to vote in order to protect themselves as well as white supremacy using the vote. Many white suffragists in Georgia were also angry that Black men got the vote before white women could vote. One suffragist, Mary Latimer McLendon, was quoted saying, "The negro men, our former slaves, have been given the right to vote and why should not we Southern women have the same right?" White suffragists in Georgia called the Reconstruction era a "horrible time of 'negro rule,' excessive federal force, and white degradation," but argued that women's suffrage would not cause a repeat of history. Because of all of these reasons, most of the suffrage groups in Georgia did not allow African-American women to join.

However, Black suffragists continued to fight for their right to vote in Georgia. African-Americans had been generally supportive of women's suffrage from the beginning of the movement. Black women used churches and groups like the National Association of Colored Women (NACW) to help organize. While Black women were excluded from the 1895 suffrage convention, Susan B. Anthony did go to Atlanta University and speak there. Adella Hunt Logan was one of the members of the audience. Logan joined NAWSA and wrote suffrage editorials for newspapers.

After World War I, lynching increased in the South. An incredibly harrowing lynching took place in 1918 to a Valdosta, Georgia woman, Mary Turner. Suffragist and leader in the NACW, Lucy Laney, reached out to white politicians and clubwomen to seek justice. The response she received was mixed, at best, and showed Black women in the state that they were alone in many issues. When Black women in Georgia asked for help with women's suffrage nationally, they were told that because their issues involved race, it was outside of the purview of the suffrage organizations.

The League of Women Voters (LWV) of Georgia didn't change their bylaws until 1956. Until that year, the Georgia LWV's bylaws said any "white woman" may be a member. Black women and men in Georgia gained greater voting rights after the 1965 passage of the Voting Right Act.

== Anti-suffragists ==
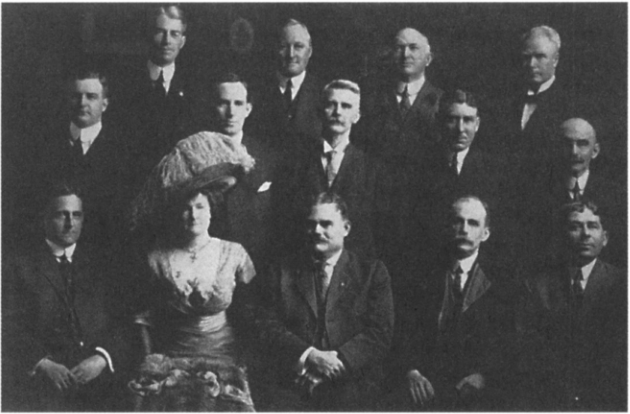
Dolly Blount Lamar at a Macon, Georgia Confederate Reunion in 1911

The Georgia Association Opposed to Woman Suffrage was organized in Macon, Georgia in May 1914. Anti-suffragists, Dolly Blount Lamar and Mildred Rutherford invoked the idea of the Lost Cause to oppose women's suffrage. Lamar and Rutherford were upper-class woman who were involved with preserving the memory of the Confederacy. Suffragists represented a change to the traditional gender roles and class roles of the antebellum South. Anti-suffragists also called suffrage a product of Northern influence and brought up Reconstruction to scare potential supporters of women's suffrage. Newspapers in Georgia also reflected this attitude about women's suffrage, with the Greensboro Herald saying that it would support women's suffrage if there were no Black women in the state. Many anti-suffragists did not want Black women to ever get the option to vote because they would not be able to use the threat of violence to keep them from voting as easily as they did with Black men. Anti-suffragists also did not want Black women to use the vote to for equal rights.

Some anti-suffragists also believed that women voting would debase politics. A preacher in Atlanta attacked women's suffrage using the Bible as a reference point. He said it was against the laws of God for women to vote and called men who supported women's suffrage "feeble-minded." Southern Baptists, who had strict gender roles during this time, were very opposed to women's suffrage. The LaGrange Graphic worried about how women might be treated by the press if they became involved in politics.

Many of the upper-class women felt that voting would upset the patriarchy and taint women's "moral superiority." Lamar, especially, felt that women did not need the vote, but rather should work with the men in their lives to influence politics. Women who supported the patriarchal systems already had a base of power in those systems that they did not want to lose or see diluted by competing in the same system as men. The Georgia Federation of Women's Clubs (GFWC) never endorsed women's suffrage because the president, Mrs. Z. I. Fitzpatrick felt they were more effective at influencing politics than individual women. The women's clubs already had a base of power. Fitzpatrick said, "We are the power behind the throne now, and would lose, not gain, by a change."

Anti-suffragists also did not want working-class women to have more power. Georgia anti-suffragists disparaged the "quality" of women who worked in factories and other jobs outside the home. After World War I, anti-suffragists began to claim that women's suffrage would bring socialism, and more labor unions to the country. Other anti-suffragists said the women's suffrage would bring atheism to Georgia.

== See also ==
- List of Georgia (U.S. state) suffragists
- Timeline of women's suffrage in Georgia (U.S. state)
- Women's suffrage in states of the United States
- Women's suffrage in the United States.
