= Miriam Howard Dubose =

American suffragist (1862–1945)

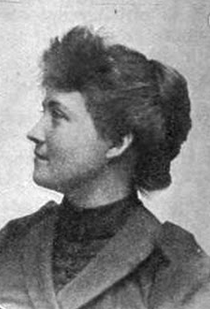
- Born: November 28, 1862; Russell County, Alabama, United States
- Died: 1945 (aged 82–83)
- Employer: First Presbyterian Church of Columbus
- Organization(s): Georgia Woman Suffrage Association; National Council of Women of the United States
- Children: 1
- Relatives: Helen Augusta Howard (sister)

Daisy Miriam Howard Dubose (1862–1945) was an American organist and suffragist. She was one of the founding members of the Georgia Woman Suffrage Association (GWSA).

== Early life ==
Dubose was born to Augustus Howard and Ann Lindsay on November 28, 1862, in Russell County, Alabama. She was one of fifteen siblings and family lived in Columbus, Georgia. She was educated by a music teacher from the age of 14 to 16.

Dubose worked as organist at the First Presbyterian Church of Columbus until her marriage and also composed instrumental music. She married at an early age and gave birth to a son, Walter Howard Dubose.

== Activism ==
In 1890, Dubose, her sisters (Helen Augusta Howard and Claudia Howard Maxwell) and their widowed mother, organized the Georgia Woman Suffrage Association (GWSA). Dubose served a vice-president of the association, which was affiliated with the National American Woman Suffrage Association (NAWSA). She attended the 1894 annual convention in Washington D.C.

After her sister convinced the NAWSA to hold the 1895 annual convention in Atlanta, Georgia, Susan B. Anthony visited the Howard sisters en route to the convention. Dubose was a delegate to the convention and gave an address titled "Georgia Curiosities." She called for women's enfranchisement in the context of her traditional feminine role as a mother, arguing that: "I am a woman and a mother. I have a son to rear whose pure moral character I am powerless properly to mould and discipline without the ballot."

Dubose was also a member of the National Council of Women of the United States.

After her husband died, Dubose reassumed her maiden name with the honorific Mrs and was known as Mrs Miriam Howard of Columbus, Georgia.

By 1920, she was employed as a stenographer in Columbus. She died in 1945.
