= Women's suffrage in Georgia =

Women's suffrage in Georgia may refer to:

- Women's suffrage in Georgia (country)
- Women's suffrage in Georgia (U.S. state)
