= Mary McLendon =

Mary McLendon may refer to:

- Mary Latimer McLendon (1840–1921), American activist in the prohibition and women's suffrage movements
- Mary Stone McLendon (1896–1967), Native American musician, storyteller, humanitarian, and educator
