= 1930 United States Senate election in Georgia =

1930 U.S. Senate Democratic primary in Georgia
- September 10, 1930

414 county unit votes 208 unit votes needed to win
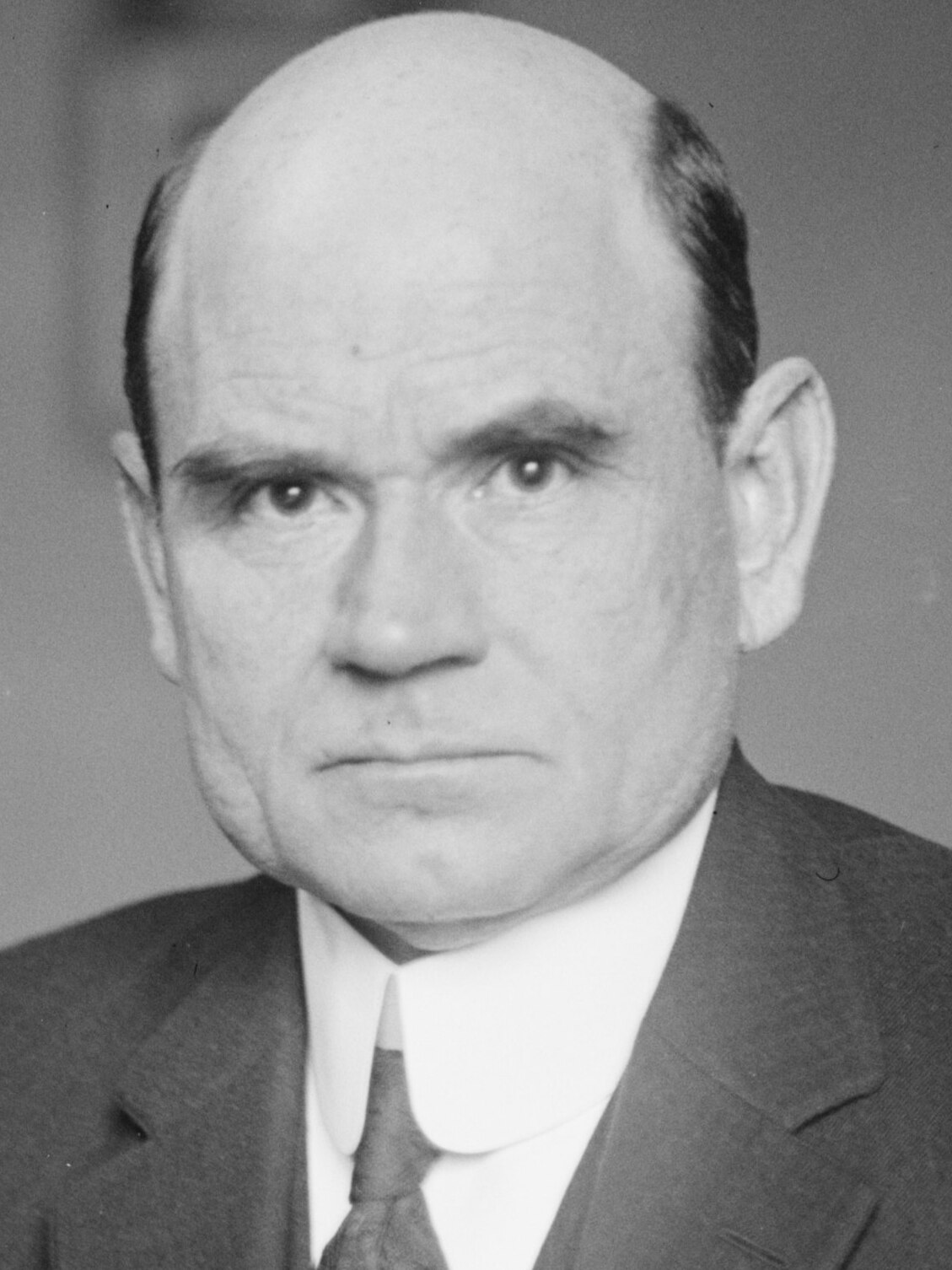

| Nominee | William J. Harris | John M. Slaton |
| Party | Democratic | Democratic |
| Electoral vote | 412 | 2 |
| Popular vote | 162,169 | 46,095 |
| Percentage | 77.87% | 22.13% |
- County results Harris: 50–60% 60–70% 70–80% 80–90% 90–100% Slaton: 50–60%
U.S. senator before election
William J. Harris
Democratic
Elected U.S. Senator
William J. Harris
Democratic

The 1930 United States Senate election in Georgia was held on November 4, 1930. Incumbent Democratic U.S. Senator William J. Harris was easily re-elected to a third term, but died before the completion of his term in 1932.

At this time, Georgia was a one-party state as the Republican party was virtually non-existant in the state, meaning that winning the Democratic nomination was tantamount to election.

== Democratic primary ==
The Democratic primary election was held on September 10, 1930. Incumbent Senator William J. Harris handily turned back a primary challenge from former Governor John M. Slaton, defeating him with 77% of the vote.

=== County unit system ===
From 1917 until 1962, the Democratic Party in the U.S. state of Georgia used a voting system called the county unit system to determine victors in statewide primary elections.

The system was ostensibly designed to function similarly to the Electoral College, but in practice the large ratio of unit votes for small, rural counties to unit votes for more populous urban areas provided outsized political influence to the smaller counties.

Under the county unit system, the 159 counties in Georgia were divided by population into three categories. The largest eight counties were classified as "Urban", the next-largest 30 counties were classified as "Town", and the remaining 121 counties were classified as "Rural". Urban counties were given 6 unit votes, Town counties were given 4 unit votes, and Rural counties were given 2 unit votes, for a total of 410 available unit votes. Each county's unit votes were awarded on a winner-take-all basis.

Candidates were required to obtain a majority of unit votes (not necessarily a majority of the popular vote), or 206 total unit votes, to win the election. If no candidate received a majority in the initial primary, a runoff election was held between the top two candidates to determine a winner.

=== Candidates ===
- William J. Harris, incumbent U.S. Senator
- John M. Slaton, former Governor of Georgia

=== Results ===
Democratic primary
| Candidate | Votes | % | CUV |
|---|---|---|---|
| William J. Harris | 162,169 | 77.87 | 412 |
| John M. Slaton | 46,095 | 22.13 | 2 |

== General election ==
=== Results ===
1930 United States Senate election in Georgia
| Party | Candidate | Votes | % |
|---|---|---|---|
| Democratic | William J. Harris (Incumbent) | 55,606 | 100.00 |
| Independent | Wallace Miller | 1 | 0.00 |
| Total votes | | 55,607 | 100.00 |
| Democratic hold | | | |
