= Seale Harris =

American physician (1870 to 1957)

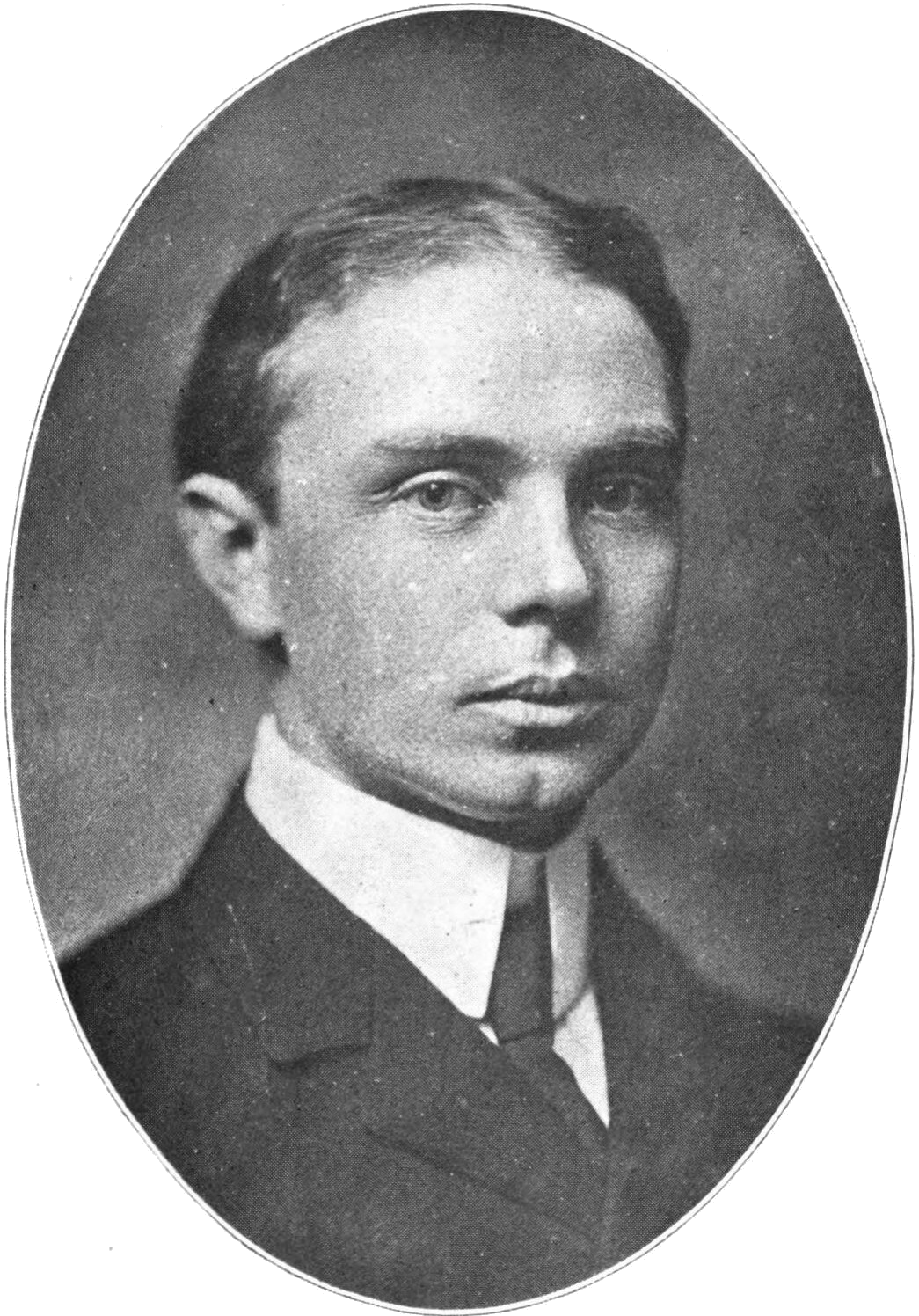
- Dr. Seale Harris circa 1910
- Born: Andrew Seale Harris; March 13, 1870; Cedartown, Georgia, U.S.
- Died: March 17, 1957 (aged 87); Birmingham, Alabama, U.S.
- Education: University of Georgia; University of Virginia (M.D.); Johns Hopkins University
- Known for: Discovery of Hyperinsulinism
- Relatives: William J. Harris (brother); Peter Charles Harris (brother)
- Awards: AMA Distinguished Service Award (1949)
- Scientific career
- Fields: Physician

Seale Harris (March 13, 1870 – March 17, 1957) was an American physician and researcher born in Cedartown, Georgia. He was nicknamed "the Benjamin Franklin of Medicine" by contemporaries for his leadership and writing on a wide range of medical and political topics. Dr. Harris' most celebrated accomplishments were his 1924 hypothesis of hyperinsulinism as a cause of spontaneous hypoglycemia.

== Life ==
Harris studied at the University of Georgia for three years, joining the Sigma Alpha Epsilon fraternity there in September 1891. He received a medical degree from the University of Virginia in 1894 and established a medical practice in Union Springs, Alabama. Dr. Harris was Bullock County health officer for eight years and also served as a surgeon in the Alabama National Guard with the rank of captain from 1903 to 1905.

After the completion of postgraduate studies at Johns Hopkins University, Dr. Harris accepted the position of Professor of Clinical Medicine at the Medical College of Alabama in Mobile in December 1907. During World War I, Harris was commissioned as a major in the Medical Corps of the U.S. Army and served with distinction.

Returning to private practice in Birmingham, Dr. Harris was instrumental in building the 50-bed Gorgas Hospital Hotel which later became Montclair Baptist Medical Center. A prolific author and contributor to medical literature, he advocated a national Department of Health, improved nutrition, and attention to diabetes mellitus. He was instrumental in establishing a camp near Mobile for children with diabetes. In tribute to his life and work, it was later designated Camp Seale Harris.

He opened the Seale Harris Clinic in Birmingham in 1922. The clinic and name are perpetuated by his successors. Shortly after the discovery of insulin in 1922, Harris visited Canada to study diabetes cases with the scientists who discovered the hormone. These studies led to research on the effects in nondiabetic patients of an excessive secretion of insulin and his recognition that hyperinsulinism could cause hypoglycemia, a deficiency of sugar in the blood. His research on hyperinsulinism and its control brought international recognition to Harris, including the Distinguished Service Medal, the highest scientific award of the American Medical Association.

While serving in the Army during World War I, he edited the journal War Medicine, published in Paris. For 12 years he was the owner and editor of the Southern Medical Journal. His writings include more than 100 contributions to the medical literature and books in such diverse fields as clinical practice, biography and politics. Widely respected among doctors, Harris served at as president of the Southern Medical Association, Medical Association of the State of Alabama, and the American Medical Editors Association.

== Harris' syndrome ==
Harris' syndrome is a historical term for hyperinsulinemic hypoglycemia, such as that caused by insulin-producing tumors of the pancreas (insulinoma). The syndrome is characterized by the symptoms of low blood sugar: weakness, hunger, shakiness, increasing nervousness, mild mental confusion or even personality alterations with erratic behaviour, and the adrenergic responses of tachycardia, pallor, and sweating. The concept of the syndrome was postulated by Harris, in 1924, after he observed hypoglycemia produced during treatment of diabetic patients with the newly discovered insulin.

The reception of Harris's findings were recounted by William Dufty:

After the discovery of insulin in 1924, "doctors and patients experimenting with insulin in its early years took too little or too much. An overdose produced symtopms of what has come to be called insulin shock. Dr Seale Harris of the University of Alabama began to notice symptoms of insulin shock in many people who were neither diabetic nor taking any insulin. These people were diagnosed as having low levels of glucose in their blood; diabetics have high levels of glucose."
The remedy was self-government of the body. The patient with low blood glucose must be prepared to give up refined sugar, candy, coffee and soft drinks – these items had caused the troubles...Hyperinsulinism or low blood glucose therapy was a do-it-yourself proposition.

Seale Harris was awarded the 1949 Distinguished Service Medal of the American Medical Association. Harris was posthumously elected in 1965 to the Alabama Hall of Fame.

Dr. Stephen Gyland of Tampa, Florida, suffered from hyperinsulinism and happened on Harris's article in The Journal of the American Medical Association. He wrote a letter to the Journal praising Harris and describing his long search for a diagnosis and treatment before finding Harris's study.

== Military career ==
With the advent of World War I, and with a commission of major in the Medical Corps of the U.S. Army, Dr. Harris was assigned to the staff of general William Crawford Gorgas. While serving overseas he was decorated for meritorious service by general John J. Pershing.

== Seale Harris Award ==
This award, named in honor of Seale Harris and established in 1958 at the Southern Medical Association meeting in New Orleans, is presented annually to a member of the Southern Medical Association in recognition of important research accomplishments in the broad field of metabolism, endocrinology, or nutrition, or for significant accomplishments contributing to a better understanding of the chemical changes occurring in disease.

== Personal ==
Harris was the son of physician Charles Hooks Harris and his wife Margaret Ann (Monk) Harris. He had four brothers and five sisters. Among his brothers were U.S. Army Major General Peter C. Harris and U.S. Senator from Georgia William J. Harris.

On April 28, 1897, Harris married Stella Rainer in Union Springs. Their daughter Josephine Ann was born in 1899 and their son Seale was born in 1900.

== Selected bibliography ==
- 1908: Jaundice and its Significance, Southern Medical Journal, via Internet Archive
- 1920: The Nation's Greatest Need: A National Department of Health, American Journal of Public Health 10(8):633–6.
- 1922: "Nutrition, The Most Important Public Health Problem of Today", Southern Medical Journal 15(12).
- 1923: Insulin and Diet In The Treatment of Diabetes, J. B. Lippincott & Co.
- 1924: "Hyperinsulinism and Dysinsulinism", Journal of the American Medical Association 83(10): 729–33.
- 1928: The Sugar Fed Child. UAB Press.
- 1934: Nomenclature of Disorders of Insulin Secretion, Annals of Internal Medicine 7(9): 1084–1100.
- 1936: The Diagnosis and Treatment of Hyperinsulism, Annals of Internal Medicine 10(4): 514–33.
- 1939: A Simplified High Carbohydrate Diet in Diabetes Mellitus, Southern Medical Association, snippet from Google Books.
- 1946: Banting's Miracle: the Story of the Discoverer of Insulin, J. B. Lippincott & Co, snippet from Google Books
- 1950: Woman's Surgeon: the Life Story of J. Marion Sims MacMillan.
