= Dorothy Blount Lamar =

American historian and activist

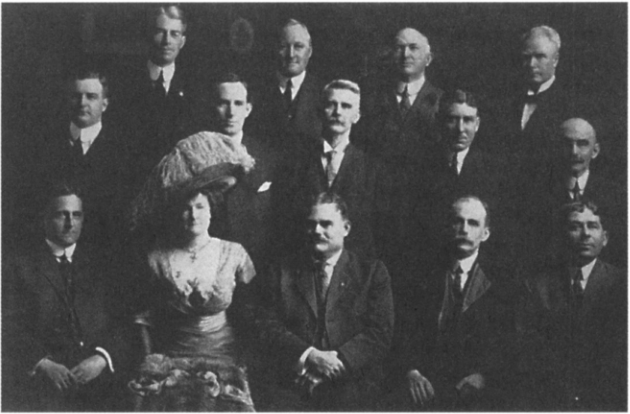
Lamar with her fellow executive committee members at a Confederate Reunion in Macon in 1911. Picture from her autobiography When All Is Said and Done.

Eugenia Dorothy (also Dolly) Blount Lamar (crediting herself Mrs Walter D Lamar) was an American historian and activist from Macon, Georgia. A staunch defender of the values of the American South during the early 20th century, she was the president of the Georgia Division of the United Daughters of the Confederacy (GDUDC) and for many years was the organization's historian.

Lamar was interested in Southern history and literature as well. She left a sum of money to Mercer University, to fund an annual lecture named for her; the Lamar Lectures have been held at Mercer since 1957. She was also a supporter of the reputation and legacy of poet and Confederate veteran Sidney Lanier, and was the president of the Lanier association in Macon.

== Biography ==
Lamar (at right) celebrating the birthday of Jefferson Davis in 1938, with Walter F. George on the left and Imogene Smith in the middle

Dorothy Blount was a daughter of lawyer, politician, and Confederate veteran James Henderson Blount. Married to Walter D. Lamar, heir to a local Georgia pharmaceutical business, Dolly Lamar opposed women having the right to vote in Georgia. Professor Michael Kreyling of Vanderbilt University characterized her as "Southern Conservatism to the backbone — the kind of antimodern, antiprogressive, static 'drag' that Gunnar Myrdal and his ilk loved to hate", who "resisted change as she would have resisted Sherman". She was elected vice-president of the Georgia Association Opposed to Woman Suffrage (GAOWS) in May 1914, and argued in her pamphlet The Vulnerability of the White Primary that giving women the vote in the South, in particular, would have the undesirable outcome of jeopardizing the control of politics by white people, a point that she also made in an address to the Constitutional Amendment Committee of the Georgia Legislature.

In opposition to Rebecca Latimer Felton, Lamar and GDUDC president Mildred Rutherford made their case to the Legislature on 1914-07-07 that the (then proposed) Susan B. Anthony Amendment was the Fifteenth Amendment in another guise, and by giving Black women the vote would engender racial equality. The daughter of James Henderson Blount, Lamar had graduated from Wesleyan Female College in Macon, and had gone on to Wellesley Women's College only after obtaining a guarantee from its officials that no "negro" girls attended that Massachusetts school.

She argued, furthermore, the partisan politics was a man's world, in which the involvement of women actually diminished their power (for which she used the example of the then failure to enact Prohibition in the states where women already had the vote), took a states' rights position that women's suffrage was a Northern imposition upon Southern states, and strongly criticized (her characterization of) the suffragists' assertion that men could not by themselves alleviate the (then) problem with illiteracy in Georgia. She called the suffragists "a fungus growth of misguided women" upon the majority of women in the state who were (by her assertion) not in favour of having the vote. Other arguments that she employed were that giving all women the right to vote, or even just all white women, would give it to "lower class" women, and dilute the influence of women of the "best class", again criticizing the suffragists for ignoring "the fact that some women are not good, some men are good" and for (in her view) erroneously assuming that "all women will vote for uplift". She rejected a "no taxation without representation" argument in favor of suffrage on the grounds that its logical extension would be to give Black people the right to vote, since they were taxpayers who were not allowed to vote, too. As she put it in her autobiography: "A hidden threat to Southern customs was of course in the amendment's grant of equal suffrage to all women, thus upsetting the restrictions of the white primary, which since Reconstruction days had left Southern political affairs in the hands of white voters. Obviously this encroachment on our system would lead to universal suffrage and serious political unbalance over the South."

Two years after that address, in May 1916, Lamar publicly challenged Helen Shaw Harrold to a public debate in an open letter, with the proceeds from ticket sales to be donated to Heimath Hall; although even anti-suffragist newspapers observed the irony that this was a three hour long public debate by two women upon a purely political subject and by its very nature indicated (in the words of an editorial in the Macon Daily Telegraph) that women were "far enough along to vote". After much back and forth over the topic for debate, and whether the winner should be judged by men (an idea to which Lamar was opposed), Lamar withdrew the challenge.

After World War I, in light of the social upheavals that it caused, Lamar expanded her position to include suffragists' "alleged" association with people like Max Eastman, a suffragist and socialist, and criticized them as misguided and their connection to socialism as the result of their ignorance.

A further irony is that as soon as women gained that right to vote, Lamar began using it, stating in her autobiography that she was "somewhat active in politics" and was "making public my attitude on measures and candidates and speaking and writing for what I believed right". History professor Elizabeth Gillespie McRae observed in a 1998 article that whilst claiming to be a "reluctant politician" Lamar in fact took to politics quite aggressively.

Lamar was a founder member of the GAOWS, and alongside fellow founding member Caroline Patterson was its primary speaker, recruiter, and legislative lobbyist.

== Other interests ==
Lamar's other interests, aside from the GDUDC and GAOWS, encompassed the YWCA, the Sidney Lanier Foundation, and the Georgia Federation of Club Women, she being one of the leading club women of the state. Lamar was interested in Southern history and literature as well. She left a sum of money to Mercer University, to fund an annual lecture named for her; the Lamar Lectures have been held at Mercer since 1957, with the first lecturer being Donald Davidson. She was also a great supporter of the reputation and legacy of poet and Confederate veteran Sidney Lanier, and was the president of the Lanier association in Macon. Charles R. Anderson, in his preface to the Centennial Edition of Lanier's work and letters, thanks her: "special thanks are due to Mrs. Walter D. Lamar, whose enthusiasm for Lanier was instrumental in launching this project". She was also the engine behind efforts to get Lanier honored in the New York Hall of Fame; she was successful on her third attempt, in 1945, and fronted the $5000 for the bust, which was made by Hans Schuler.

== Publications ==
- Sidney Lanier: Musician, Poet, Soldier. Macon: Burke. 1922.
- When All Is Said and Done. Athens: University of Georgia Press. 1952. (republished U of Georgia P, 2010, ISBN 9-780-8203-3541-4)
