= William J. Harris =

American politician (1868–1932)

William Julius Harris
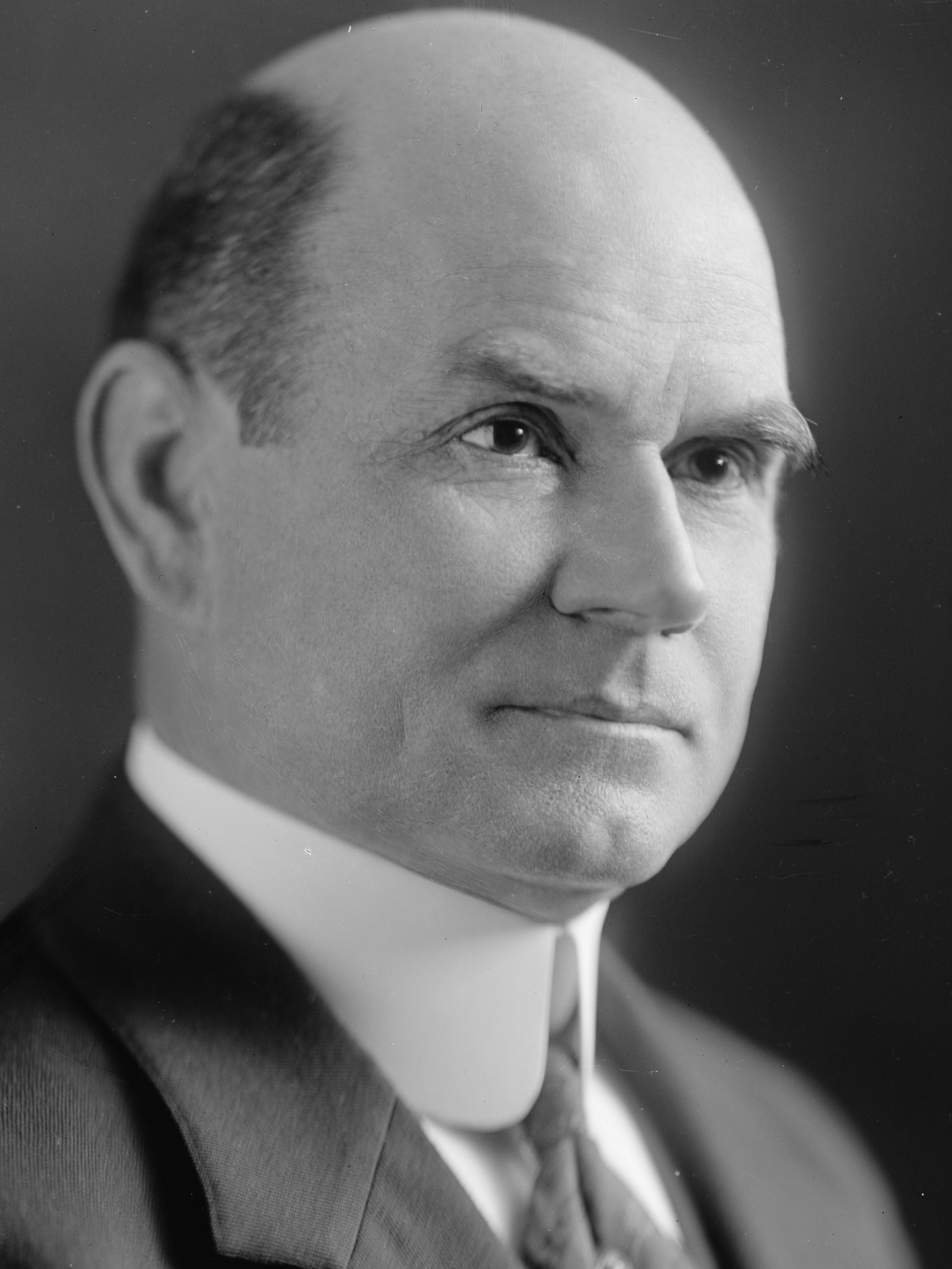

United States Senator from Georgia
- In office March 4, 1919 – April 18, 1932
- Preceded by: Thomas W. Hardwick
- Succeeded by: John S. Cohen

Personal details
- Born: William Julius Harris; February 3, 1868 Cedartown, Georgia, U.S.
- Died: April 18, 1932 (aged 64) Washington, D.C., U.S.
- Party: Democratic
- Relatives: Peter Charles Harris (brother); Seale Harris (brother)
- Education: University of Georgia

William Julius Harris (February 3, 1868 – April 18, 1932) was a United States senator from the state of Georgia. He was a great-grandson of Charles Hooks, who had been a Representative from North Carolina, and son-in-law of Joseph Wheeler, Confederate General and Representative from Alabama.

== Early life ==
Harris was born in Cedartown in Polk County, Georgia, and attended the common schools. He graduated from the University of Georgia at Athens in 1890.

He married Julia Knox Hull Wheeler (November 27, 1870 - January 6, 1959), daughter of Joseph Wheeler.

== Career ==
He engaged in the general insurance business and banking at Cedartown, Georgia. He served as private secretary to U.S. Senator Alexander S. Clay from 1904 to 1909.

Entering politics, Harris was elected as a Democrat to the Georgia Senate in 1911 and 1912. From 1913 to 1915 he served as appointed Director of the United States Census Bureau; he also served as Acting Secretary of the Department of Commerce from 1913 to 1915. In 1915 he resigned when he was appointed as a member of the Federal Trade Commission.

He was chairman of the FTC 1917-1918. In 1918, he was elected as a Democrat to the US Senate, and reelected in 1924 and 1930. He served in total from March 4, 1919 until his death. While in the Senate, Harris was a member of the National Forest Reservation Commission from 1929 to 1932.

He died of a heart attack in Washington, D.C. Funeral services were held in the Chamber of the United States Senate. His interment was in Greenwood Cemetery in Cedartown.

After Harris' death in 1932, the governor of Georgia, Richard Russell, Jr., declared a special election for September of that year to fill the vacant seat. Russell declared his own candidacy and won the election to replace Harris.

== Personal ==
Harris was the son of physician Dr. Charles Hooks Harris and his wife Margaret Ann (Monk) Harris. He had four brothers and five sisters. Among his brothers were U.S. Army Major General Peter C. Harris and Alabama physician Dr. Seale Harris.

On July 28, 1905, Harris married Julia Knox Hull Wheeler in New York City. Their daughter Julia Wheeler Harris was born in 1909.

== See also ==
- List of members of the United States Congress who died in office (1900–1949)

Party political offices
Preceded by Thomas W. Hardwick	Democratic nominee for U.S. Senator from Georgia (Class 2); 1918, 1924, 1930	Succeeded by Richard Russell Jr.
Political offices
Preceded by Edward Dana Durand	Director of the United States Census Bureau; 1913 – 1915	Succeeded by Samuel Lyle Rogers
U.S. Senate
Preceded by Thomas W. Hardwick	U.S. senator (Class 2) from Georgia; 1919–1932; Served alongside: M. Hoke Smith, Thomas E. Watson, Rebecca Latimer Felton and Walter F. George	Succeeded by John S. Cohen
