= Rebecca Latimer Felton =

American white supremacist and feminist activist (1835–1930)

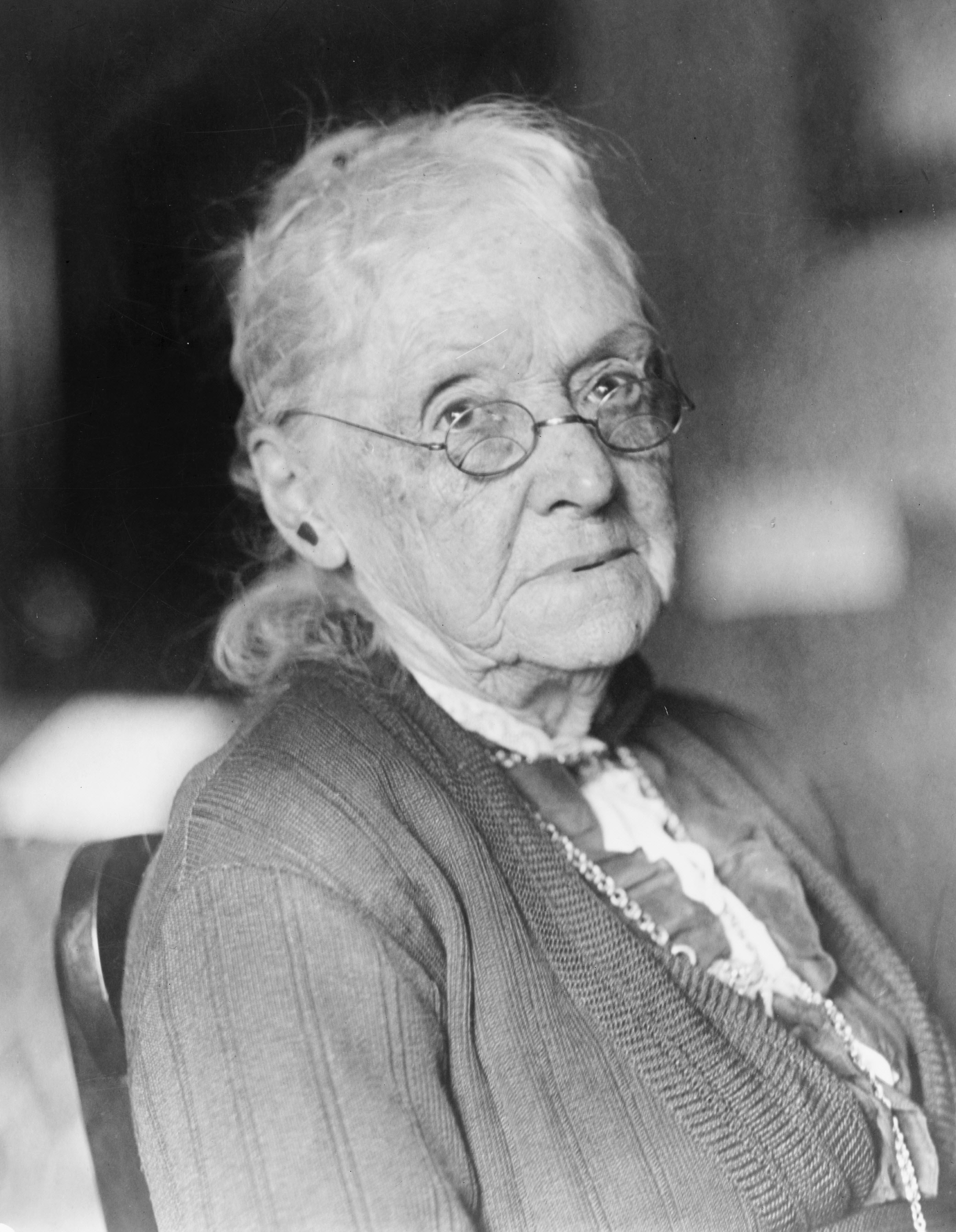
- Felton in 1922

United States Senator from Georgia
- In office November 21, 1922 – November 22, 1922
- Appointed by: Thomas W. Hardwick
- Preceded by: Thomas E. Watson
- Succeeded by: Walter F. George

Personal details
- Born: Rebecca Ann Latimer; June 10, 1835 Decatur, Georgia, U.S.
- Died: January 24, 1930 (aged 94) Atlanta, Georgia, U.S.
- Resting place: Oak Hill Cemetery
- Party: Democratic
- Spouse: William Harrell Felton (m. 1853; died 1909)
- Children: 5
- Education: Madison Female College

Rebecca Ann Felton (née Latimer; June 10, 1835 – January 24, 1930) was an American politician, white supremacist, slave owner, writer, and feminist who was the first woman to serve in the United States Senate, serving for only one day.

Felton was a prominent member of the Georgia upper class who advocated for white supremacy, prison reform, women's suffrage and education reform. Her husband, William Harrell Felton, served in both the United States House of Representatives and the Georgia House of Representatives, and she helped organize his political campaigns. She spoke vigorously in favor of lynching African Americans, stating the belief that such acts would protect the sexual purity of European-American women. A major figure in American first-wave feminism, historian Numan Bartley wrote that by 1915 Felton "was championing a lengthy feminist program that ranged from prohibition to equal pay for equal work."

The most prominent woman in the state of Georgia during the Progressive Era, she was honored near the end of her life by a symbolic one-day appointment to the Senate. Felton was sworn in on November 21, 1922, and served just 24 hours. At the age of 87, she was the oldest freshman senator to enter the Senate. Felton was the last person to serve in the Senate to have owned slaves in her lifetime. Felton was the only woman to have served as a senator from Georgia until the appointment of Kelly Loeffler in 2020, nearly 100 years later.

== Early life ==
Felton was born in Decatur, Georgia, on June 10, 1835. She was the daughter of Charles Latimer, a prosperous planter, merchant, and general store owner. Charles was a Maryland native who had moved to DeKalb County in the 1820s, and his wife, Eleanor Swift Latimer, was from Morgan, Georgia. Felton was the oldest of four children; her sister, Mary Latimer, also became prominent in women's reforms in the early 20th century. When Felton was 15, her father sent her to live with close relatives in the town of Madison, where she attended a private school within a local Presbyterian church. She then went on to attend Madison Female College, from which she received a classical liberal arts education. She graduated at the top of her class, at age 17, in 1852. Based on her autobiography, Felton's ancestors were Virginians and Marylanders before settling in Georgia. As per family tradition, she traced her ancestry to colonial settlers who came from England during the 17th century.

In October 1853, she married Dr. William Harrell Felton at her home, and she moved to live with him on his plantation just north of Cartersville, Georgia. She gave birth to five children, one daughter and four sons. Only one, Howard Erwin Felton, survived childhood. In the aftermath of the American Civil War, their plantation was destroyed. Dr. Felton returned to farming as a way to earn money until they had enough savings to open a school. Felton and her husband opened Felton Academy in Cartersville, where she and her husband both taught.

== White women's suffrage ==
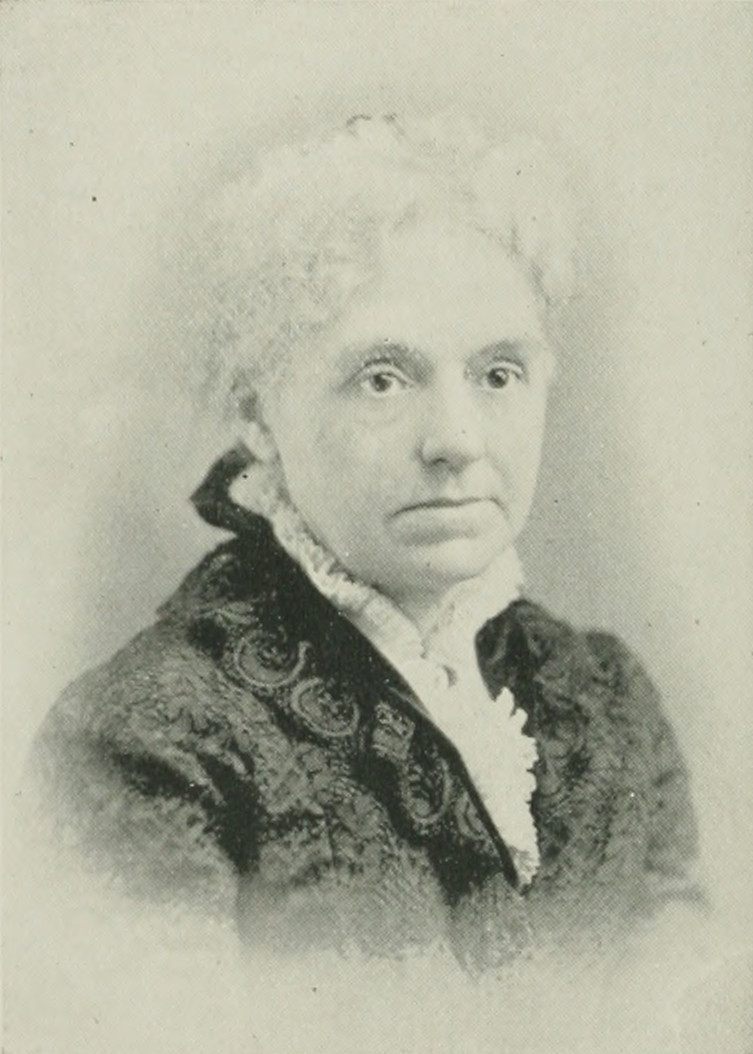
"A Woman of the Century"

By joining the Woman's Christian Temperance Union in 1886, Rebecca Latimer Felton was able to achieve stature as a speaker for equal rights for white women. Upon her entrance into the public realm, independent of her husband's political career, in the late 19th century, Felton attempted to employ middle-class men to help middle-class women achieve equal status in society. She believed that it was necessary for men to be held accountable, and, during her 1887 address at the Women's Christian Temperance Union state convention, she argued that women were actively fulfilling their duties as wives and mothers, but that men undervalued their importance. She argued that women should have more power inside of the home, with more influence on the decision-making process and proper education being provided both to wives and daughters; she further stated that women should have economic independence through this education, training, and later employment, and that women should have more influence over the children. In 1898, Felton wrote "Textile Education for Georgia Girls" as an attempt to convince Georgia legislators that education for girls was necessary. In this article, she argued that it was a man's responsibility to take care of his wife and children. Therefore, it was his responsibility to ensure his daughters' rights and opportunities were equal to his sons'.

However, this strategy was ineffective, and, in 1900, Felton joined the women's suffrage movement. This move led her to work for women's rights, including the right to vote, the progressive movement, free public education for women, and admittance into public universities. A prominent activist for women's suffrage in Georgia, Felton found many opponents in anti-suffragist Georgians such as Mildred Lewis Rutherford and Dorothy Blount Lamar. During a 1915 debate with Rutherford and other anti-suffragists before the Georgia legislative committee, the chairman allowed each of the anti-suffragists to speak for 45 minutes but demanded Felton stop speaking after 30 minutes. Felton ignored him and spoke for an extra 15 minutes, at one point making fun of Rutherford and implicitly accusing her of hypocrisy. However, the Georgia legislative committee did not pass the suffrage bill. Georgia was later the first state to reject the Nineteenth Amendment to the United States Constitution when it was proposed in 1919, and, unlike most other states in the Union, Georgia did not allow women to vote in the 1920 presidential election. Women in Georgia were not given the right to vote until 1922.

Felton criticized what she saw as the hypocrisy of Southern men who boasted of superior Southern "chivalry" but opposed women's rights, and she expressed her dislike of the fact that Southern states resisted white women's suffrage longer than other regions of the United States. She wrote, in 1915, that women were denied fair political participation

except in the States which have been franchised by the good sense and common honesty of the men of those States—after due consideration, and with the chivalric instinct that differentiates the coarse brutal male from the gentlemen of our nation. Shall the men of the South be less generous, less chivalrous? They have given the Southern women more praise than the man of the West—but judged by their actions Southern men have been less sincere. Honeyed phrases are pleasant to listen to, but the sensible women of our country would prefer more substantial gifts....

== Racial views ==
After she was married at age 18, Felton and her husband owned slaves before the American Civil War, and she was the last member of Congress to have been a slave owner.

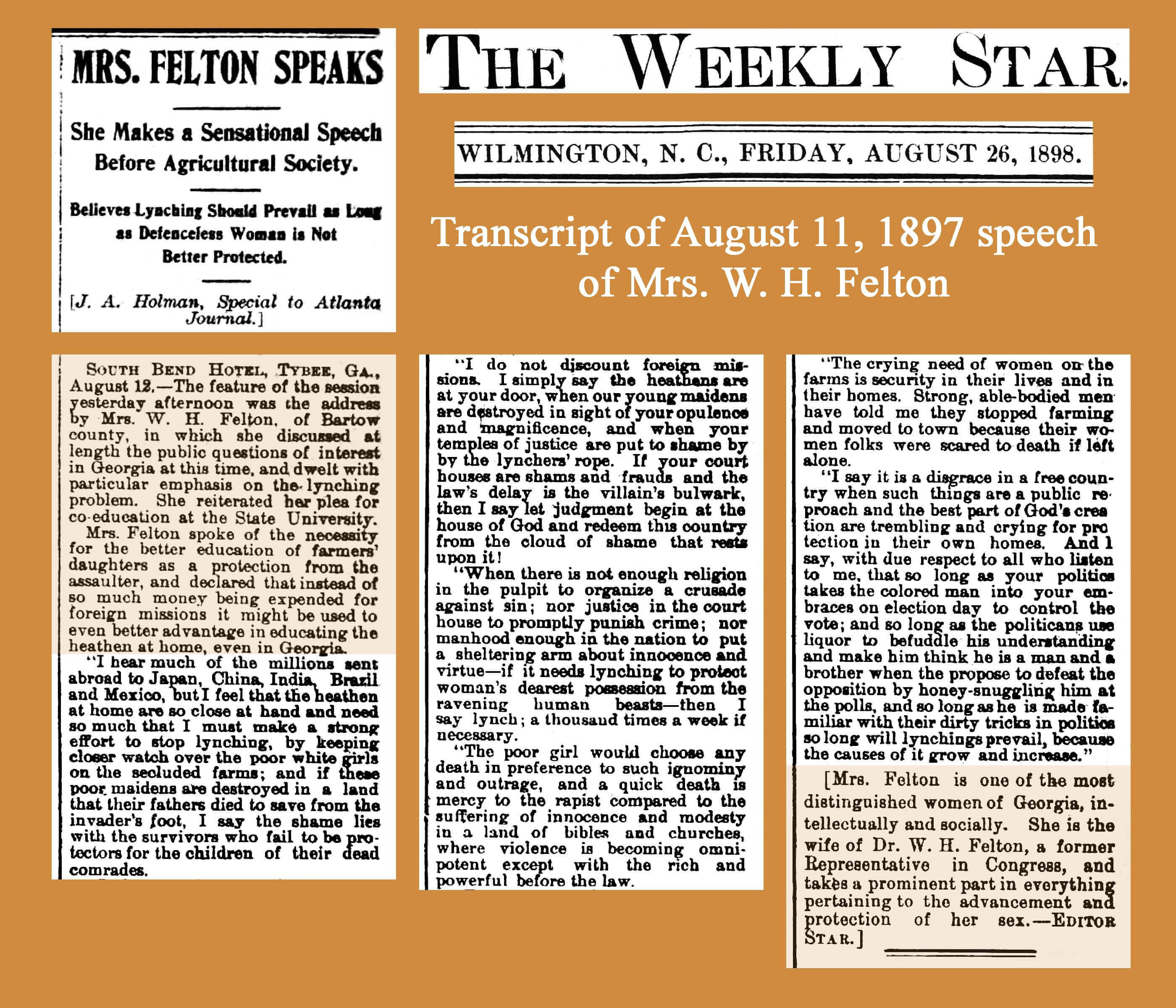
On August 11, 1897, Felton delivered a speech promoting lynching "... I say lynch; a thousand times a week if necessary."

Felton was a white supremacist. She claimed, for instance, that the more money that Georgia spent on black people's education, the more crimes black people committed. For the 1893 World's Columbian Exposition, she "proposed a southern exhibit 'illustrating the slave period,' with a cabin and 'real colored folks making mats, shuck collars, and baskets—a woman to spin and card cotton—and another to play banjo and show the actual life of [the] slave—not the Uncle Tom sort.'" She wanted to display "the ignorant contented darky—as distinguished from Harriet Beecher Stowe's monstrosities."

Felton considered "young blacks" who sought equal treatment "half-civilized gorillas", and ascribed to them a "brutal lust" for white women. While seeking suffrage for white women, she decried voting rights for black people, arguing that it led directly to the rape of white women.

Felton also advocated more lynchings of black men, saying that such was "elysian" compared to the possible rape of white women. On August 11, 1897, Felton gave a speech in Tybee Island, Georgia, to several hundred members of the Georgia State Agricultural Society. She urged an increase in lynchings in order to protect rural white women from being raped by black men.

When there is not enough religion in the pulpit to organize a crusade against sin; nor justice in the court house to promptly punish crime; nor manhood enough in the nation to put a sheltering arm about innocence and virtue – if it needs lynching to protect woman's dearest possession from the ravening human beasts – then I say lynch, a thousand times a week if necessary.

— Rebecca Felton, August 11, 1897

In 1898 newspapers reprinted a transcript of Felton's speech to garner support for the Democratic Party. On August 18, 1898, Alex Manly's Daily Record printed a rebuttal editorial arguing that white rape of black women was much more frequent, and contact between white women and black men was often consensual. Manly's editorial was used as a pretext for the Wilmington massacre of November 1898.

Manly was interviewed by the Baltimore Sun three days after the massacre, and he stated that he only had wished to defend African-American men libeled by Felton. He said that his editorial had been distorted by white newspapers. Felton's response appeared in the November 16 issue of the Raleigh News and Observer: "When the negro Manly attributed the crime to intimacy between negro men and white women of the South the slanderer should be made to fear a lyncher's rope rather than occupy a place in New York newspapers."

In 1899, a massive crowd of white Georgians arrested, tortured, and lynched a black man, Sam Hose, who had been accused of murdering a white man and raping his victim's wife. Felton said that any "true-hearted husband or father" would have killed "the beast" and that Hose was due less sympathy than a rabid dog.

In her 80's, she reflected on the Civil War, writing "If there had been no slaves there would have been no war. To fight for the perpetuation of domestic slavery was a mistake. The time had come in the United States to wipe out this evil. The South had to suffer..."

On the removal of the Cherokee from their territory in Georgia, Felton stated that "methods used to dispossess the Indians of their happy hunting grounds will ever be a humiliating confession of the Anglo-Saxon’s greed and injustice against their red brother."

== Day as a senator ==
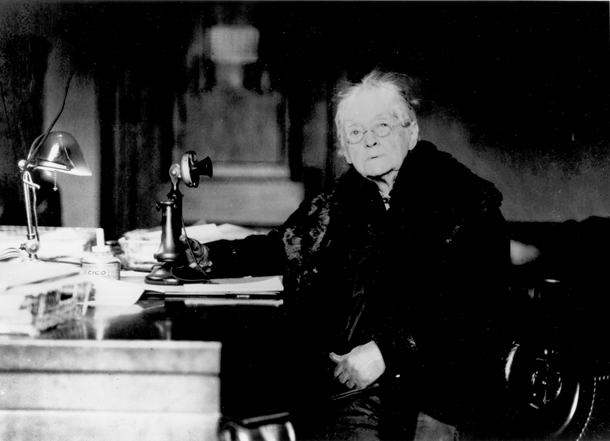
Felton at her Senate desk

Thomas W. Hardwick, the governor of Georgia, was planning to run as a candidate in the next election to the U.S. Senate, which was due in 1924. However, the current incumbent Senator Thomas E. Watson died unexpectedly on September 26, 1922. As governor, Hardwick was entitled to appoint a replacement for Watson until a special election could be arranged. Hardwick sought an appointee who would not be a competitor in the coming election, and to ingratiate himself with the new women voters (who had been alienated by Hardwick's opposition to the Nineteenth Amendment). On October 3, Hardwick therefore selected Felton to serve as senator, because she was a well known and respected representative of the suffrage movement. Congress was not expected to reconvene until after the special election, which was scheduled for November 7, so it was considered unlikely that Felton ever would be sworn in. Walter F. George defeated Hardwick by 55% to 33% in the Democratic Party primary, and was elected unopposed in the special election. Rather than take his seat immediately when the Senate reconvened on November 21, George allowed Felton to be sworn in. This was due in part to persuasion by Felton and a supportive campaign launched by the white women of Georgia. George benefited from the gesture, by presenting himself as a friend of the suffrage movement. Felton thus became the first female senator, serving until George took office one day later.

== Final years ==
Felton was interviewed on film on April 9, 1929, at her home in Georgia, discussing her political accomplishments and her memories of witnessing part of the Trail of Tears around the year 1838. The interview was created for Fox Movietone News. She was a member of the Daughters of the American Revolution and the United Daughters of the Confederacy. Felton continued to write and lecture until her final days, finishing her book, The Romantic Story of Georgia's Women, shortly before her death in Atlanta in 1930. Her remains were interred in the Oak Hill Cemetery in Cartersville.

== Notable writings ==
- "The Country Home" (1898–1920) – recurring article within the Atlanta Journal
- My Memoirs of Georgia Politics (1911)
- Country Life in Georgia in the Days of my Youth (1919)
- The Romantic Story of Georgia's Women (1930) OCLC 33940186

== See also ==
- Women in the United States Senate

== Works cited ==
- Litwack, Leon F. (1999). Trouble in Mind: Black Southerners in the Age of Jim Crow (1st ed.). New York: Vintage Books. ISBN 978-0-375-70263-1.
- Zucchino, David (2020). Wilmington's Lie: The Murderous Coup of 1898 and the Rise of White Supremacy. Atlantic Monthly Press. ISBN 978-0-8021-2838-6.

U.S. Senate
Preceded by Thomas Watson	United States Senator (Class 3) from Georgia; 1922; Served alongside: William Harris	Succeeded by Walter George
Honorary titles
Preceded by Chauncey Depew	Oldest living U.S. senator 1928–1930	Succeeded by Adelbert Ames
