= 1924 United States Senate election in Georgia =

1924 U.S. Senate Democratic primary in Georgia
- September 10, 1924
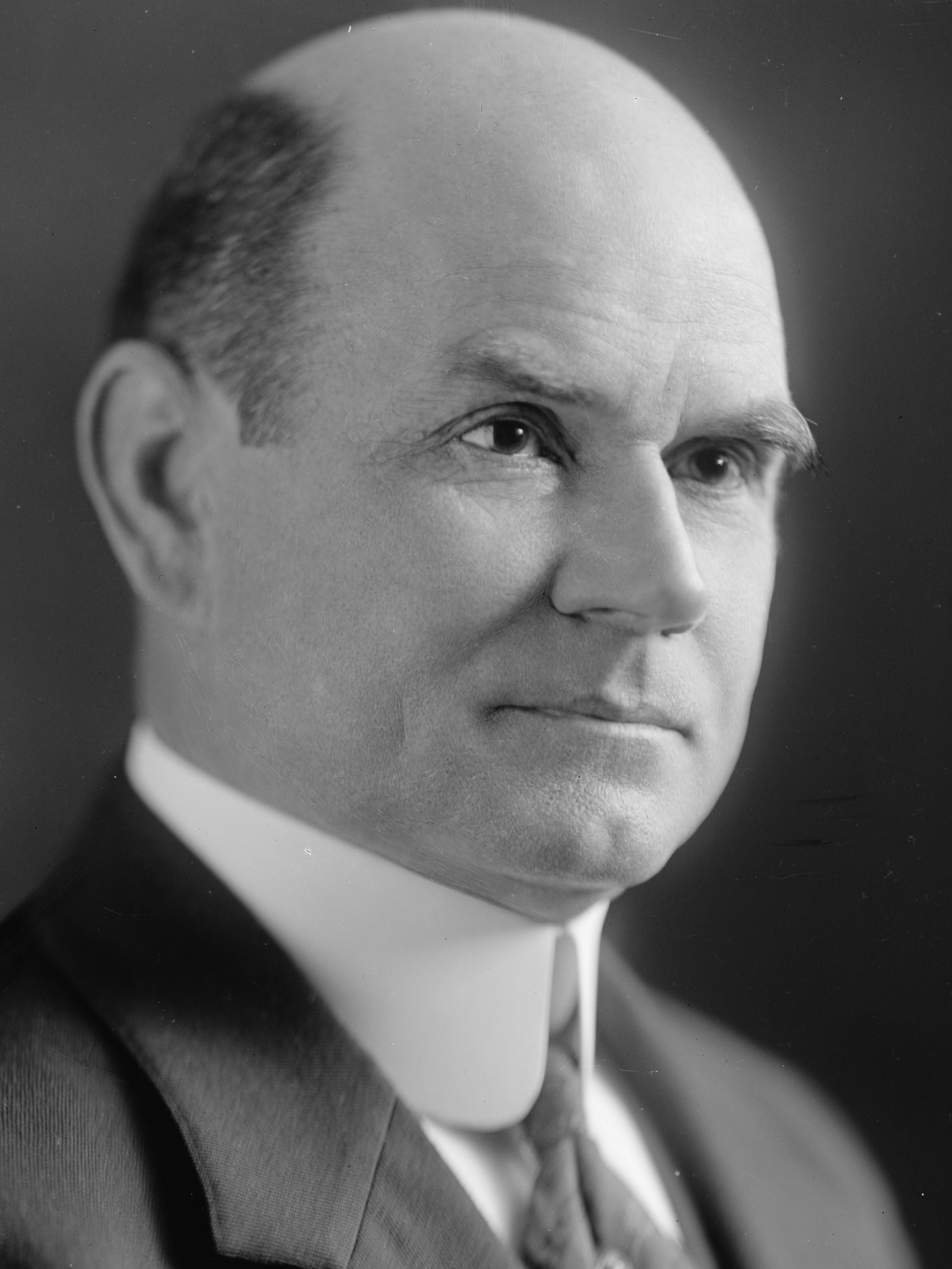

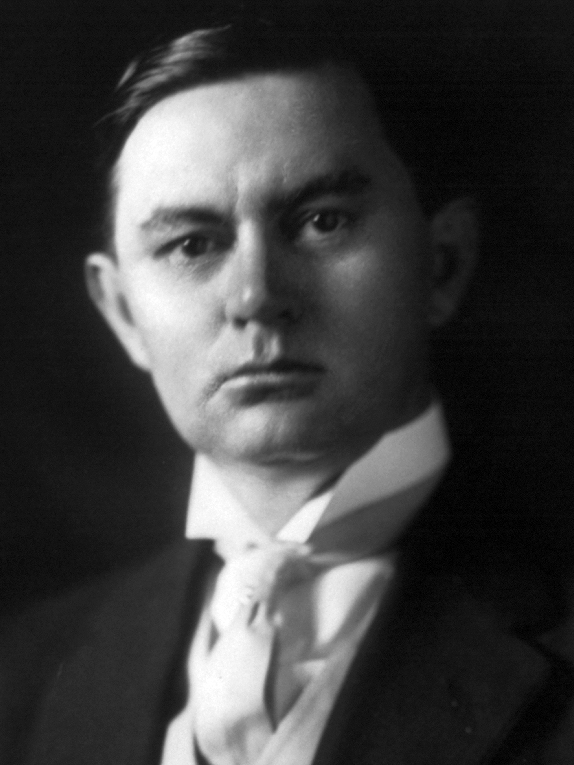
| Nominee | William J. Harris | Thomas W. Hardwick |
| Party | Democratic | Democratic |
| Electoral vote | 380 | 32 |
| Popular vote | 144,740 | 75,713 |
| Percentage | 65.66% | 34.34% |
U.S. senator before election
William J. Harris
Democratic
Elected U.S. Senator
William J. Harris
Democratic

The 1924 United States Senate election in Georgia took place on November 4, 1924. Incumbent Democratic U.S. Senator William J. Harris was re-elected to a second term in office.

As was common at the time, the Democratic candidate ran with no opposition in the general election so therefore the Democratic primary was the real contest, and winning the primary was considered tantamount to election.

== Democratic primary ==
The Democratic primary election was held on September 10, 1924.

=== County unit system ===
From 1917 until 1962, the Democratic Party in the U.S. state of Georgia used a voting system called the county unit system to determine victors in statewide primary elections.

The system was ostensibly designed to function similarly to the Electoral College, but in practice the large ratio of unit votes for small, rural counties to unit votes for more populous urban areas provided outsized political influence to the smaller counties.

Under the county unit system, the 159 counties in Georgia were divided by population into three categories. The largest eight counties were classified as "Urban", the next-largest 30 counties were classified as "Town", and the remaining 121 counties were classified as "Rural". Urban counties were given 6 unit votes, Town counties were given 4 unit votes, and Rural counties were given 2 unit votes, for a total of 410 available unit votes. Each county's unit votes were awarded on a winner-take-all basis.

Candidates were required to obtain a majority of unit votes (not necessarily a majority of the popular vote), or 206 total unit votes, to win the election. If no candidate received a majority in the initial primary, a runoff election was held between the top two candidates to determine a winner.

=== Candidates ===
- Thomas W. Hardwick, former Governor, former U.S. Senator
- William J. Harris, incumbent U.S. Senator

=== Results ===
Democratic primary, 10 September 1924
| Candidate | Popular vote | | County unit vote | |
| Candidate | Votes | % | Votes | % |
|---|---|---|---|---|
| William J. Harris | 144,740 | 65.66 | 380 | 92.23 |
| Thomas W. Hardwick | 75,713 | 34.34 | 32 | 7.77 |
| Total | 220,453 | 100.00 | 412 | 100.00 |

== General election ==
=== Results ===
1924 United States Senate election in Georgia
| Party | Candidate | Votes | % |
|---|---|---|---|
| Democratic | William J. Harris (Incumbent) | 155,497 | 100.00% |
| Democratic hold | | | |

== Bibliography ==
- Guide to US Elections, Fifth Edition, Volume II. CQ Press. 2005. ISBN 978-1-56802-981-8.
- Compiled by Ruth Blair, ed. (1925). Georgia's Official Register, 1925 (PDF). Atlanta, GA: State of Georgia, Department of Archives and History.
