= First Presbyterian Church (Columbus, Georgia) =

Historic church in Georgia, United States

- U.S. National Register of Historic Places
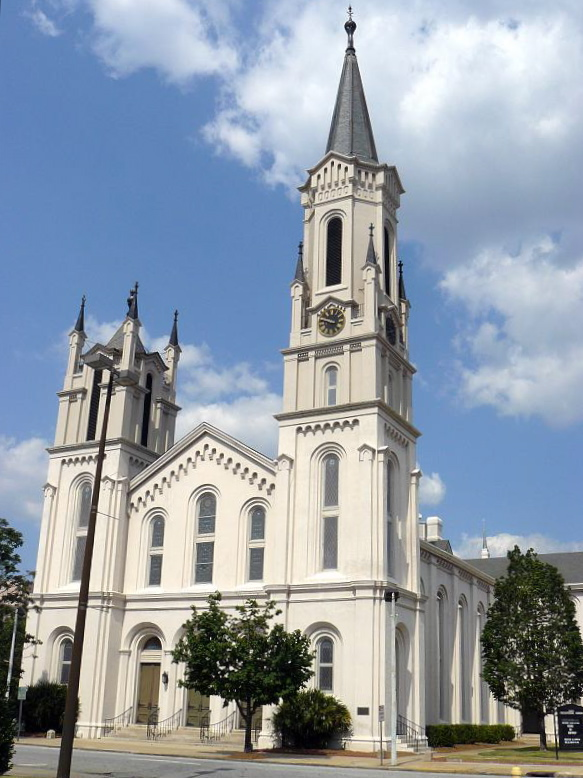

- Location within Georgia Location within the United States
- Location: 1100 1st Ave., Columbus, Georgia
- Coordinates: 32°28′0″N 84°59′30″W
- Area: 1 acre (0.40 ha)
- Built: 1862
- Architect: Bates, Col. Asa
- Architectural style: Romanesque
- MPS: Columbus MRA
- NRHP reference No.: 80001167
- Added to NRHP: September 29, 1980

First Presbyterian Church is a historic church at 1100 1st Avenue in Columbus, Georgia. The church is affiliated with the PCUSA. Its building was added to the National Register of Historic Places in 1980.

The congregation had worshipped in two previous church buildings before having its current building built, at cost of more than $30,000. It was dedicated in 1862. The building was damaged by fire in November 1891 but was fully restored by February 1893.

It was listed on the National Register along with other historic properties identified in a large survey.
