= Frances C. Swift =

American Southern Unitarian lay leader and suffragette (1834–1908)

Frances Cater Swift
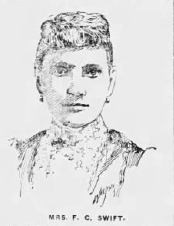
- Born: Frances Green; September 15, 1834; Burnt Corn, Alabama, US
- Died: February 7, 1900 (aged 65); Pensacola, Florida, US
- Occupation(s): Church Lay Leader, Suffragette
- Spouses: Edwin Lawrence Cater (1850-1874); Thomas Swift (1879-1882)

Frances Cater Swift (1834–1908) was an influential female lay leader in the early days of the spread of Unitarianism in the American South. In the social climate, when a woman's status was conferred through her husband's status, Swift achieved many of her successes as a widowed woman.

She broke what is now called the gender gap, serving in leadership positions in her Atlanta church, Church of Our Father. She was the only female director during the seven years she served on the Board of Directors of the Southern Conference of Unitarian and Other Christian Churches.

A contemporary of Susan B. Anthony, Swift was the first president of the Atlanta Equal Suffrage Association. She later served as the president of the statewide Georgia Woman Suffrage Association.

== Early life ==
Frances Green, born in Burnt Corn, Alabama, on September 15, 1834, was the ninth of twelve children of John Robert Green and Nancy Betts Jones. Her parents had three more children after Frances.

Her father was born in Abbeville in Western South Carolina in 1790. At age 23, in 1813, he enlisted in the United States military and was stationed in Georgia. He thus saw service during the War of 1812 (1812–1815). He was discharged in 1814.

A year after his discharge, he married Nancy Betts Jones, age 15, from Milledgeville, Georgia. In 1816, they moved to Burnt Corn, Alabama, with their first-born child, Juliana. There they continued to expand their family. John Green and his wife Nancy Betts lived and died in Burnt Corn.

Green had successful careers as a farmer, Justice of the Peace, attorney, and Alabama State Representative.

== Marriage and children ==
In August 1850, Frances, 16, married Edwin Lawrence Cater, 25, in Burnt Corn, Alabama. They moved to Milton, Florida, where they had two children, William Edwin Cater (1852–1930) and Iola (sometimes Jola) Aquilar (1853–1863).

Her husband served in the Confederate Army during the American Civil War (1861–1865) as a 1st Lieutenant but resigned in 1863 to become the State Senator for Santa Rosa County, Florida. Cater's resignation was accepted along with a replacement, W.W. Greene, who was recruited to continue his service. Also in 1863, Frances's daughter Iola died at age 10.

After the American Civil War, they continued to live in Milton, Florida, where it appears her husband was a grocer. After 24 years of marriage, Frances's husband died in February 1874. He was interred in the John Green Cemetery in Burnt Corn, Alabama.

In 1879, five years after the death of her first husband, Frances married Thomas Swift (1834–1882) of Atlanta, Georgia. Swift was from an old, well-established family of prosperous farmers in Morgan County, Georgia. He had moved to Atlanta in 1875, living at 76 Spring Street. After their marriage, the Swifts continue to live at this address.

It has been difficult to determine her husband's profession, which has been noted in historical records as a merchant, broker, and travel agent. Her husband died in 1882 at age 48 and was buried in Atlanta's Oakland Cemetery.

== Education ==
No records have been found describing Swift's formal education. Given the isolation of her upbringing in southwestern Alabama, it is unlikely that she had access to formal educational facilities. However, both secular and religious education were valued in her family.

In an 1893 article in The Southern Unitarian Swift wrote that her father had a personal library that he continued to expand despite the steep cost of purchasing and transporting books.

Shortly before Swift's birth, her father built a local school and church, adding, “He organized and taught at the first school himself.”

Her father especially prioritized religious education. Swift described how Sunday service attendance, when available, was central in her family. At this time, only occasional services were provided whenever a Presbyterian, Methodist, or Baptist circuit rider was in the area. Swift noted that this exposure to multiple doctrinal interpretations of a soul's fate in the afterlife made her father yearn for a more satisfactory interpretation.

Being brought thus in contact with the doctrines and teachings of the different sects and finding in them so little that was really useful, he began to question their authority and turned to the Bible for a solution of the question (regarding the afterlife).

After years of studying the scriptures, he came to a Universalist point of view, rejecting the eternal torment of hell in the afterlife. Such a belief in the rural isolation of Alabama was considered blasphemy and traveling ministers subsequently shunned him. Nonetheless, her father continued his religious pursuits, briefly securing the services of Rev. H.F. Stearns, a Universalist circuit rider. Stearns said of the senior Green

This gentleman, I can say in justice, is the father of the blessed doctrine of Universalism in this section of the State of Alabama. He is allowed to be, even by those who oppose his sentiments, a man of unimpeachable character, a worthy citizen, and a kind, obliging neighbor.

Stearns himself was in the vanguard of the spread of Universalism in Alabama. In 1835, Stearns replaced Rev. L.F.W. Andrews, another pioneering Universalist, as the minister of the Montgomery Universalist Church. Swift adopted her father's liberal religious beliefs.

== Church of Our Father ==
Swift's arrival in Atlanta in 1879 predates by two years the arrival of the Boston-based Unitarian minister, Rev. George Leonard Chaney. Chaney was sent to Atlanta by the American Unitarian Association to establish a church in that city. He was successful in his mission, organizing the Church of Our Father in 1883 and dedicating a church building in April 1884.

Chaney's church at the corner of Forsyth and Church (now Carnegie Way) was just a half-mile from Swift's home on Spring Street.

The exact date of Swift joining the church is unknown. The church's membership list shows her name as the 36th added to the church roster. By July 1886, she was active in church affairs. That year, she was an alternate delegate to the National Conference of Unitarian and Other Christian Churches held in Saratoga, New York.

For nine years she served on numerous church committees including the ladies’ auxiliary, nominating, board advisory, constitution revision, and other ad hoc committees. In 1895, she was chosen as a delegate to the National Conference of Unitarian and Other Christian Churches held in Washington, D.C.

Also in 1895, Swift and another woman, Mrs. Owens, were elected to the church's board of trustees. Swift and Owens were the first women elected to the board. Swift would continue to serve in other capacities on the ladies' auxiliary, ways and means, and ministerial search committee to replace the departing Rev. William Scott Vail.

The last mention of Swift's name in the church's records was in November 1889. She is listed as a member of the nominating committee and along with Caroline Chaney, the minister's wife, continued her service on the ladies' auxiliary committee.

== Suffrage ==
On March 28, 1894, the inaugural meeting of the Atlanta Equal Suffrage Association was held in the parlor of the Church of Our Father. The organization's objective was to secure voting rights for women. This Atlanta organization was an auxiliary to the statewide Georgia Woman's Suffrage Association. This statewide organization was formed four years earlier, in 1890, in Columbus, Georgia, by Augusta Howard and her sister Claudia Hope Maxwell née Howard.

Swift was elected president of this Atlanta auxiliary branch at the March meeting. In her address at the meeting, Swift said,

Ladies and friends — if I did not feel so deeply the need of an organized effort on the part of women everywhere, I could not accept the office with which you have honored me. My strong conviction of right is my only fitness. The time has certainly arrived when we can no longer shirk the duties which our present development makes imperative.

The Atlanta Equal Suffrage Association continued holding its regular meetings at the Church of Our Father. At the second annual meeting of the Atlanta suffragists in March 1895, Swift was again elected president, and Mary Latimer McLendon continued as first vice president. Also that year, Swift was elected president of Georgia's statewide Woman's Suffrage Association, serving from 1895 to 1896.

Another item on the agenda for the Atlanta organization was to prepare for the 1895 annual meeting of the National American Woman Suffrage Association to be held in Atlanta. Both Swift and McLendon served on committees preparing for the convention, with Swift leading the Printing Committee and McLendon on the Committee of General Information.

After Susan B. Anthony, president of the national organization, called the Atlanta convention to order, Swift and McLendon were then appointed to functionary committees; Swift to finance and courtesies, and McLendon to credentials.

In addition to seeking access to the ballot, the Atlanta Equal Suffrage Association also sought additional rights and protections for women. The Association launched a campaign to have the Atlanta police department hire a female matron. This matron would have the primary reasonability of interacting with women and young girls whom the police had detained, or as the campaign literature stated, “who may have the misfortune to drift into the cruel hostelry (of a police station).”

Two legislative initiatives were also launched. One proposed bill would raise the age of consent in Georgia from ten to 18. The other bill cut to the heart of the suffrage movement, lobbying for Georgia women to be placed on legal and political equity with men. Neither bill saw passage.

In 1896 or 1897, Swift paused her activities with the Atlanta Equal Suffrage Association when she moved to Pensacola, Florida. The reason for her return to Florida is not entirely apparent. She was back in Atlanta in 1899, where she again became president of the Atlanta Equal Suffrage Association.

In February 1900, Swift, as the president of the Atlanta Equal Suffrage Association, again represented Atlanta as a delegate to the National American Woman Suffrage Association convention held in Washington, D.C. This convention marked the end of an era with Susan B. Anthony delivering her farewell address, ending her presidency of the national organization.

== Southern Conference of Unitarian and other Christian churches ==
Coinciding with the dedication of the new Unitarian church in 1884, Rev. Chaney convened a meeting to organize the Southern Conference of Unitarian and other Christian Churches. With this work, Chaney replicated the conference structure he had helped establish in the mid-1860s during his pastorate at the Hollis Street Church in Boston.

The Southern Conference provided an organizational structure for Southern Unitarian churches from Texas to Georgia and Maryland to Florida.

Swift was the third woman to serve as a director of this conference. She was, however, the only woman on the Board of Directors from 1893 to 1900.

In 1895, Swift also served as the president of the Southern Associate Alliance. The Southern Associate Alliance was a women's group formed in 1890 as an auxiliary to the larger Southern Conference of Unitarian and other Christian Churches. The Alliance allowed women to develop personal relationships across the various churches in the Southern Conference and was an organizational structure for “missionary and denominational work.”

The Alliance had branches in the churches in the Southern Conference. By 1890, the Southern Associate Alliance had 11 branches with a total membership of 160 women. Caroline Chaney, the wife of Rev. George Leonard Chaney, followed Swift as president in 1896.

== European travel ==
Swift frequently traveled to Europe for months at a time. In March 1893, Swift advertised in The Atlanta Constitution that she intended to gather a tour party to travel in Europe from June to September. The advertisement read, "She will make the usual excursion (to Europe) and wishes a party of ten to twelve." The itinerary for this trip, her fourth European trip, included visits to England, Ireland, Scotland, Holland, Germany, Switzerland, Italy, and France. Swift had a working knowledge of French, German, and Italian.

Swift would often regale attendees at the Church of Our Father's Fortnightly Club with recitations of papers such as "Scenes from Florence" and "Reminiscences of Ireland and Scotland."

== Death ==
During the ten years prior to her death, Swift alternated living in Atlanta and Pensacola, Florida.

Frances Cater Swift, better known as Fannie, died on February 7, 1900, at the home of son William Edwin Cater on 805 North Alcaniz Street, Pensacola, Florida. She is buried in the John Green Cemetery in Burnt Corn, Alabama, with her parents and first husband.
