= Emily C. McDougald =

American women's suffrage advocate

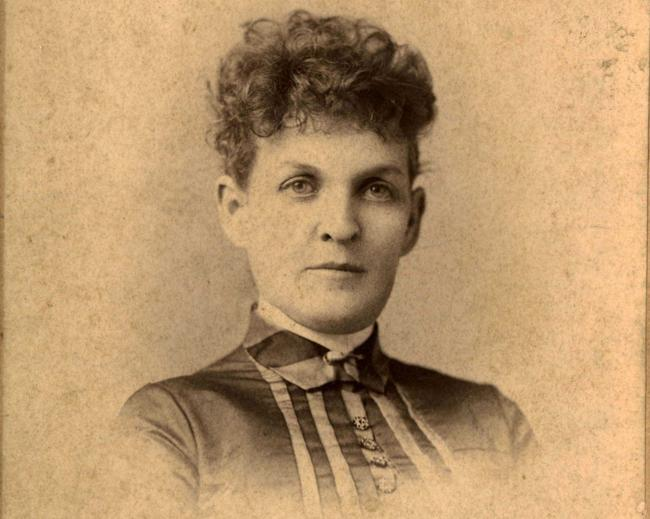
- Emily C. McDougald
- Born: Emily Caroline Fitten; November 11, 1848; Augusta, GA, U.S.
- Died: January 13, 1938 (aged 89); Fulton County, GA, U.S.
- Resting place: Linwood Cemetery (Columbus, Georgia)
- Known for: Advocacy of: women's suffrage

Emily Caroline McDougald (born Emily Caroline Fitten; November 11, 1848 – January 13, 1938) was a women's suffrage advocate in Georgia. She became the first president of the Equal Suffrage Party of Georgia (ESPG) in 1914. As president, McDougald worked with the ESPG to raise funds, organize parades, and pass out printed information to educate women and the public on the benefits of allowing women to vote. McDougald also drafted the resolution that the Democratic Party in Georgia passed, allowing white women to vote in the Democratic primaries before women's right to vote in the 19th Amendment was passed and ratified.

Women's suffrage was only part of the social and political activism McDougald participated in during her life. She helped in war relief efforts for both the American Civil War and World War I. After women won the right to vote, McDougald was part of the Georgia suffragists that worked together to form the Georgia chapter of the League of Women Voters in Georgia, an organization that encourages and educates women in voting and is still active today.

== Life and death ==
Emily Caroline Fitten was born in Augusta, Georgia on November 11, 1848, to Colonel and Mrs. John Fitten of Augusta and Atlanta. She was married to William Alexander McDougald and birthed four children (three of her children lived into adulthood). After her husband's death in 1887, she managed the family's land in Columbus, Georgia. Eventually, McDougald moved herself and her family to Atlanta, Georgia, in 1897, selling the property in Columbus. While living in Atlanta, McDougald was involved with the women's suffrage movement, other local municipal politics, and war relief efforts.

Her daughter, Emily Inman, followed her footsteps in war relief, philanthropy, social activism, and women's suffrage advocation, participating in the first women's suffrage parade held in Atlanta.

Emily McDougald died at the age of 89 in Fulton County, Georgia.

== Activism ==
=== War Relief Efforts ===
During the American Civil War, Emily McDougald helped care for those wounded. During World War I, she was recruited by Mildred McPheeters Inman and the Georgia division of the Women's Council of National Defense to help with war and social efforts stateside.

McDougald also worked with the Young Women's Christian Association (YWCA) in Atlanta during World War I. In concern for the young women, she emphasized to the Women's Council of National Defense a need for a protector to be among the young women working in the mills to guide them "away from immorality." She saw them as easy targets for soldiers.

She was appointed chairman of the War Council of the National YWCA for the Atlanta branch.

While suffragist work was put on hold during World War I, McDougald was optimistic that women's efforts in supporting the country during the war would add reinforcement to the suffrage movement after the war ended. She stated that suffrage officers served councils, stamp and bonds campaigns, and Red Cross fundraising.

=== Equal Suffrage Party of Georgia ===
In 1914, Emily McDougald and Mary Raoul created the Equal Suffrage Party of Georgia to support the suffrage movement outside Atlanta. McDougald was elected the party's first president, a title she served many times during its active years. She and the ESPG provided the public with thousands of pamphlets, books, and printed speeches to the public. They also sought funds for parades, plays, movie slides, and student essay and debate contests to raise awareness and gain support through their campaigns and suffrage teas. By seeking members in the Georgia Federation of Women's Club, the ESPG grew its numbers from less than 100 that first year to nearly 2,000 by January 1915.

During 1915, the ESPG experienced resistance to one of their parades. The suffrage parade was to immediately follow another parade that day, starting theirs as the first ended. Instead, police allowed foot and vehicle traffic to commence after the first parade ended, knowing about the suffragist plans. McDougald wrote to the National American Woman Suffrage Association, wanting their reaction, but immediately sent a follow-up message the next day recanting her request. However, she personally voiced her displeasure about the police activity that day directly to the police chief, police committee, and city council.

The ESPG applied pressure to Georgia lawmakers. In one instance during a hearing on the women's suffrage amendment, McDougald and the ESPG placed a table with their printed materials inside the Georgia State House between the House and Senate chambers to "press the issues more forcibly upon lawmakers." They were allowed to show a map of the states currently allowing women to vote, though nothing came of their efforts at this time. In 1917, McDougald and ESPG members wrote letters to Congress, urging support for the bill to create a Women's Suffrage Committee, but they were ignored.

McDougald gained support for women's suffrage through her letters and speeches. She wrote many letters to state women's organizations, lawmakers, and political leaders. In her letters to women's organizations, McDougald focused on how women being able to vote would allow them to further their causes and efforts. This led to women joining the suffrage movement in Georgia. While speaking on the suffrage movement in government hearings, McDougald also retained the support of a Georgia senator and the mayor of Fulton County, Georgia.

McDougald wrote a letter to the legislature responding to anti-suffragist rhetoric in May 1915. In the letter, she argued that the government could not justify withholding voting from taxed individuals who must obey laws. She also reminded them that twelve states already allowed women to vote, and positive stories had emerged from those states that exercised rights. She also saw no concern about the white agenda being overruled as she observed that white women outnumbered black women. And lastly, she told the legislature that suffrage would come eventually.

In 1919, Emily McDougald wrote a resolution adopted by the Georgia Democratic Party by a 24-1 vote. Each man who voted in favor stood up to express cooperation with granting suffrage. This resolution allowed women to participate in the Democratic white primary prior to the ratification of the 19th Amendment. A few white women voted in their first election in Georgia; however, Black women were threatened with violence and turned away.

=== League of Women Voters of Georgia ===
After the 19th Amendment was passed but not approved by all states, including Georgia, the National American Women Suffrage Association began to focus on readying women to vote. In February 1920, the association formed the National League of Women Voters. At the last Equal Suffrage Party meeting, Emily McDougald was given the okay to merge the Georgia branches into the state version of the League of Women Voters. On April 3, 1920, in McDougald's home, 22 suffragists formed the League of Women Voters of Georgia. What started in McDougald's home has grown to 2,000 members in 16 chapters as of 2006.

Emily McDougald and Mrs. S.B.C. Morgan were given honorary president titles for life. The League of Women Voters of Georgia supported many reforms towards the beginning of its inception: child labor laws, the Sheppard-Towner Act of 1912 (funded maternity and childcare), prison system reformation, and home rule (increasing local government power).
