= Georgia Woman Suffrage Association =

U.S. state political group

The Georgia Woman Suffrage Association was the first women's suffrage organization in the U.S. state of Georgia. It was founded in 1890 by Helen Augusta Howard (1865–1934). It was affiliated with the National American Woman Suffrage Association (NAWSA).

== History and purpose ==
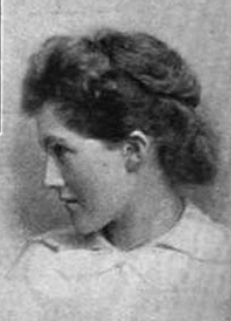
Helen Augusta Howard (1895)

The purpose of the association was to make people more aware of the inequality in voting practices, not to directly affect legislation. The women of the group did not see themselves as a political organization. Two main arguments for suffrage they used were (1) women are taxed therefore they should be represented and (2) democracy derives its power from those who are governed and women are governed. In 1894, Howard spoke at the National Woman Suffrage Association in Washington, D.C., and convinced the delegates to have the next convention in Atlanta, Georgia. The convention featured speakers such as Susan B. Anthony, Carrie Chapman Catt, Henry Blackwell and GWSA's own Mary Latimer McLendon. The convention was the first time NAWSA held their annual convention outside Washington, D.C., and it was the first large women's rights gatherings in the South.

In November 1899, GWSA held a statewide convention. At the convention, the suffragists decided to also expand their work to lobby the Georgia General Assembly on various issues related to human rights and women's rights, as well as women's suffrage. Frances A. Griffin of the GWSA spoke the State Federation of Labor and was able to secure their support for women's suffrage.

=== Presidents ===
The following suffragists served as presidents of GWSA, along with the years of their terms.

- Helen Augusta Howard, 1890–1895
- Frances Cater Swift, 1895–1896
- Mary Latimer McLendon, 1896–1899
- Gertrude C. Thomas, 1899–1901
- Katherine Koch, 1901–1904
- Rose Y. Colvin, 1904–1906
- Mary Latimer McLendon, 1906–1921
