= Mary Latimer McLendon =

American activist

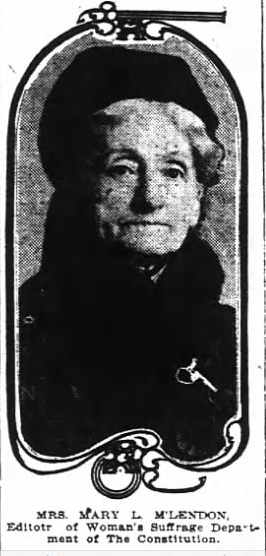
- McLendon in 1913
- Born: Mary Latimer; June 24, 1840; DeKalb County, Georgia, United States
- Died: November 20, 1921 (aged 81); Atlanta, Georgia, United States
- Education: Southern Masonic Female College
- Known for: Woman's Christian Temperance Union; Georgia Woman Suffrage Association
- Relatives: Rebecca Latimer Felton (sister)

Mary Latimer McLendon (June 24, 1840 – November 20, 1921) was an American activist in the prohibition and women's suffrage movements in the U.S. state of Georgia.

Born into the planter class in the Antebellum South, she would move to Atlanta before the American Civil War. After the war, she became involved in the temperance movement, founding a local chapter of the Woman's Christian Temperance Union (WCTU) in the early 1880s. While an activist for in the temperance movement, she began to be involved with the women's suffrage movement, joining the Georgia Woman Suffrage Association in 1892 and later serving as its president for several years in the late 1800s and early 1900s. During her lifetime, she saw the ratification of both the Eighteenth and Nineteenth Amendments to the United States Constitution, which, respectively, instituted nationwide prohibition of alcohol and expanded suffrage to women. She died in 1921 at the age of 81. An ornate drinking fountain inside the Georgia State Capitol was erected as a memorial to her in 1923.

== Early life ==
Mary Latimer was born on June 24, 1840, in DeKalb County, Georgia. Her parents were Eleanor Swift and Charles Latimer. She was the younger sister of Rebecca Latimer. Both sisters grew up in the Old South as part of a slaveholding family during the Antebellum era that later supported the Confederacy during the American Civil War. At the time of Mary's birth, the family was financially well-off, owning a plantation, general store, and tavern in the area. In 1845, the family moved to Decatur, Georgia, to allow their children to attend the primary school there. During their childhood, the family became involved in a Christian revival that was occurring in the area during that time, and both women would eventually become members of the Methodist church. After completing their primary school education, their father enrolled them in separate women's academies, with Mary enrolling at the Southern Masonic Female College in Covington, Georgia. She was of English descent, tracing back ancestry to the colonial settlers from the 17th-century.

On January 29, 1860, following her graduation, she married Nicholas A. McLendon, a business owner from Atlanta, and the two lived in the city along Peachtree Street. By April 1861, the couple had their first child, a son named Charles Latimer McLendon. At the outbreak of the Civil War, the family remained in Atlanta, with Nicholas serving as a member of a quartermaster department with the Confederate States Army. The couple had a second son during this time, named Edgar H. McLendon. While they remained in the city throughout most of the Atlanta campaign, they ultimately left the city following evacuation orders issued by General John Bell Hood, relocating to Crawfordville, Georgia, where they remained until the war's end. Following the war, the family returned to Atlanta in 1868, where they had their third child, a daughter named Mary Eleanor McLendon. Nicholas, who worked in several fields after returning to the city, eventually found stable work as a superintendent of a streetcar company.

== Woman's Christian Temperance Union ==
From the return to Atlanta until about 1880, McLendon primarily engaged in traditional women's roles, including housekeeping and child rearing. However, by the 1880s, she had founded the Frances Willard chapter of the WCTU, which would grow to become one of the most active chapters in the group. In addition, she pushed for the passage of a state law that would have institute the teaching of "the debilitating effects of alcohol use" in schools. McLendon was a firm proponent of educating young children and school students on temperance, and in 1890, she was appointed Superintendent of the Demorest Medal Contest for the Georgia WCTU, which annually awarded essays written by students on the topic of temperance. In addition to early temperance education, she pushed unsuccessfully for the Georgia branch of the WCTU to support women's suffrage, a position already endorsed by the national organization. She was disappointed in the decision by Methodist officials in the state to not allow their churches to be used as meeting places for the WCTU, as they disapproved of the national organization's stance. She believed that, while education on temperance was important, allowing women the right to vote was crucial to the success of the temperance movement.

In 1907, the government of Georgia instituted a statewide prohibition, and several years later, in 1918, the state voted to ratify the Eighteenth Amendment to the United States Constitution, which instituted a nationwide prohibition. Even after these changes, the WCTU would continue to remain active, pushing for greater enforcement of prohibition and increased education efforts, among other policies.

== Women's suffrage ==
In 1892, McLendon joined the Georgia Woman Suffrage Association (GWSA), which was affiliated with the National American Woman Suffrage Association (NAWSA) and had been founded two years earlier by Helen Augusta Howard and Claudia Howard in Columbus, Georgia. This Columbus chapter was the first suffrage society founded in the state. The same year she joined, she became an officer in the group, and in 1894, along with Margaret Chandler, she founded an Atlanta chapter of the GWSA. (Note: A 2020 article in The Atlanta Journal-Constitution gives the year as 1896.) The Atlanta chapter was only the second one in the state, and with its 40 members, its creation over doubled the size of the state association. In January 1895, NAWSA held its annual convention in Atlanta, with McLendon giving a welcoming address before a standing-room only crowd at DeGive's Opera House. Headlined by speeches given by Susan B. Anthony and Methodist minister Anna Howard Shaw, this was the first annual convention held by NAWSA outside of Washington, D.C., and brought significant attention to the suffrage movement in Georgia. In 1896, she became the president of the state organization, a position which she held until 1899. She would later serve again from 1906 to 1921. On November 25–26, 1901, the state convention was held in Atlanta at the First Universalist Church, with McLendon giving an address before the crowd.

Starting in 1913, McLendon began an extensive newspaper writing campaign where she pushed for women's suffrage, and additionally around this time, she led the GWSA in working with other women's suffrage groups to carry out a flyer campaign. That same year, The Atlanta Constitution offered McLendon the position of editor of their newly created "suffrage department". The following year, she spoke before the Georgia House of Representatives, who were holding hearings on the issue of suffrage. She was joined by several other suffragists, including her sister. However, the committee presiding over the hearings ultimately decided against suffrage. In 1919, the government of Atlanta allowed women's suffrage at the municipal level, and that same year, the U.S. Congress approved the Nineteenth Amendment to the United States Constitution, paving the way for women's suffrage at the national level. The amendment was ratified in August 1920, but the state government resisted implementing the new amendment, arguing that, because women had not registered in time, they would not be able to participate in the 1920 United States elections. Despite challenges by McLendon, many women were not able to vote in that year's elections and instead had to wait until 1921 to vote. Shortly after these changes, the GWSA would disband and encourage members to join the recently created League of Women Voters.

== Death and legacy ==
On November 20, 1921, at the age of 81, McLendon died. Her death was reported on the front page of The Atlanta Constitution. Shortly after her death, members of both the Georgia WTCU and the GWSA pushed for the creation of a memorial in her honor, which took the form of a marble drinking fountain erected in the south hall of the Georgia State Capitol. The fountain, which features a carving in her likeness, was dedicated in October 1923 as the first memorial ever erected in the capitol building in honor of a woman. The fountain bears the inscription "Mother of Suffrage in Georgia". The New Encyclopedia of Southern Culture refers to McLendon as "Georgia's leading suffragist".

== Bibliography ==
- Blair, Ruth (October 1940). "Atlanta's Monuments". Atlanta Historical Bulletin. V (23). Atlanta Historical Society: 273–277 – via Atlanta History Center.
- Gatti, Stacey Hortsmann (2009). "Mary Latimer McLendon (1840–1921)". In Chirhart, Ann Short; Wood, Betty (eds.). Georgia Women: Their Lives and Times. Vol. I. University of Georgia Press. pp. 245–271. ISBN 978-0-8203-3900-9 – via Google Books.
- Harper, Ida Husted, ed. (1922). The History of Woman Suffrage. Vol. VI. National American Woman Suffrage Association. J. J. Little & Ives Company – via Google Books.
- Pirani, Fiza (August 16, 2020). "Remembering suffragettes with Georgia ties as 19th Amendment turns 100". The Atlanta Journal-Constitution. Cox Enterprises. Archived from the original on December 31, 2020.
- Pullen, Ann Ellis (May 14, 2004). "Mary Latimer McLendon (1840-1921)". New Georgia Encyclopedia. Archived from the original on January 18, 2021.
- Taylor, A. Elizabeth (Winter 1979–1980). "Woman Suffrage Activities in Atlanta". Atlanta Historical Journal. XXIII (4). Atlanta Historical Society: 45–54 – via Atlanta History Center.
- Taylor, A. Elizabeth (2009). "Suffrage and Antisuffrage". In Wilson, Charles Reagan; Bercaw, Nancy; Ownby, Ted (eds.). The New Encyclopedia of Southern Culture. Vol. 13: Gender. University of North Carolina Press. pp. 276–279. ISBN 978-1-4696-1672-8 – via Google Books.
- "Mary Latimer McLendon". Today in Georgia History. Archived from the original on October 23, 2020.
