= Helen Augusta Howard =

American suffragist and philanthropist (1865–1934)

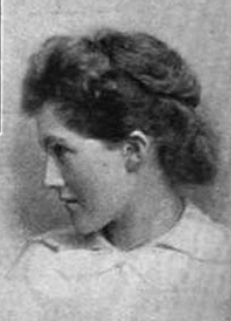
- Born: May 11, 1865; Columbus, Georgia, United States
- Died: June 10, 1934 (aged 69); New York City, New York, United States
- Burial place: Linwood Cemetery
- Organization: Georgia Woman Suffrage Association
- Relatives: Miriam Howard Dubose (sister)

Helen Augusta Howard (May 11, 1865 – June 10, 1934) was an American suffragist and philanthropist. Howard was born in Columbus, Georgia, and was one of the founding members of the Georgia Woman Suffrage Association (GWSA).

== Early life and education ==
Howard was born on May 11, 1865, in Columbus, Georgia, and was one of fifteen siblings. Howard was the youngest child and grew up on the family home, Sherwood Hall (their antebellum home). Howard's father died when she has younger so her mother had difficulties paying for the taxes on Sherwood Hall. Howard was frustrated that women had to pay taxes yet where not represented in government and could not vote. She studied for two years in Staunton, Virginia, and was interested in the writings of John Stuart Mill.

== Activism ==
In 1890, Miss Howard, her mother, and her sisters organized the Georgia Woman Suffrage Association (GWSA). The purpose of the association was to make people more aware of the inequality in voting practices and not to directly affect legislation. The women of the group did not see themselves as a political group. Two main arguments for suffrage the women used were (1) women are taxed therefore they should be represented and (2) democracy derives its power from those who are governed and women are governed. In 1894, Howard spoke at the National Woman Suffrage Association (NAWSA) in Washington, D.C., and convinced the delegates to have the next convention in Atlanta. Howard and her sisters funded the convention in Atlanta. After the Atlanta convention in 1895, Susan B. Anthony came to visit Columbus and the Howard sisters at Sherwood Hall.

Howard took the civil service exam in 1897 and became the first woman to serve as a public employee in Columbus, Georgia. She worked as a money order clerk in the post office until 1900, where she may have been forced out because her brothers didn't want her working. Howard went on to volunteer as vice president of GWSA in 1901. In 1908, she spoke at the 1908 state suffrage convention.

Howard was an outspoken atheist and was a vegetarian. She became an embarrassment to the more conservative members of her family and her brothers eventually cut off money to Howard.

== Later life and death ==
In 1920, Howard apparently accidentally shot a boy trespassing on Sherwood Hall and the boy was hospitalized and eventually recovered. However, Howard was charged for intent to murder. Howard's attorney was Viola Ross Napier, one of the first women to practice law in Georgia. Nevertheless, Howard was sentenced to prison for a term of one to two years. Howard's brothers fought to have her sentence commuted and Governor Thomas Hardwick pardoned Howard on December 2, 1921. Soon after, Howard moved to New York City.

Howard died on June 10, 1934, in New York City. Her body was buried in her home town of Columbus, Georgia at Linwood Cemetery. Her tombstone, erected by friends, reads "Altruist, Artist, Philosopher, and Philanthropist" under her name and "MARTYRED" in very large letters at the bottom.
