= Arp =

Arp or ARP may refer to:

== Businesses and organizations ==
- Applied Research in Patacriticism, a digital humanities lab based at the University of Virginia, US
- Amphibious Reconnaissance and Patrol Unit, a Taiwan special forces group
- Air Raid Precautions, a UK civil defence 1924–1946
- Anti-Revolutionary Party (Dutch Anti-Revolutionaire Partij), a defunct Dutch political party
- Autoradiopuhelin (car radio phone), a Finnish mobile phone network
- Assembly of the Representatives of the People, Tunisian government
- Associate Reformed Presbyterian Church (ARPC), US
- Association for Research in Personality, US

== Law ==
- Adaptation Reporting Power, under the UK 2008 Climate Change Act
- American Rescue Plan Act of 2021, an economic stimulus bill

== Music ==
- ARP Instruments, a former electronic musical instrument maker
- Arpeggiator, on sound synthesizers and electronic organs
- "Arp", a song by Apoptygma Berzerk from The Apopcalyptic Manifesto
- "Arp", a song by Arcane Roots from Melancholia Hymns
- "Faust Arp", a song by Radiohead from their album In Rainbows
- "Arp #1", a song by French artist Jackson and His Computerband from his album Glow.

== Places ==
- Arp, Georgia, US
- Arp, Tennessee, US
- Arp, Texas, US

== Science and technology ==
- Active rollover protection, a vehicle safety technology
- Address Resolution Protocol, a communication protocol
- Arc routing problem, a category of general routing problems
- Arp catalogue, of galaxies
- Arp, a rosemary cultivar

== People ==
- Andrice Arp (born 1969), US comics artist and illustrator
- Bill Arp, (1826-1903) Charles Henry Smith, US writer and politician.
- Halton Arp (1927–2013), American astronomer
- Fiete Arp (born 2000), German footballer
- Jean Arp (1886–1966) or Hans Arp, German-French artist
- Robert Arp (born 1970), American philosopher
- Sophie Taeuber-Arp (1889–1943), Swiss artist
- Arp Schnitger (1648-1719), German organ builder

== Other uses ==
- Airport reference point, a designated geographical location
- Aerial Rescue Platform, a type of stretcher used in helicopter rescue missions
- Arapaho language (ISO 639-3 code: arp), a Native American language

== See also ==
- AARP, formerly the American Association of Retired Persons
- Actin-related protein, for example Arp10)
  - Arp2/3 complex, a protein
- ARP spoofing, a networking attack
- AR-15–style pistol, a handgun with an AR-15-style receiver
