= Princess Eugénie =

Princess Eugénie or Princess Eugenia may refer to:

== Eugénie ==
- Princess Victoria Eugenie of Battenberg (1887–1969), Queen of Spain
- Princess Eugénie of Bourbon (born 2007), daughter of Prince Louis Alphonse, Duke of Anjou
- Princess Eugénie of Greece and Denmark (1910–1989), daughter of Prince George of Greece and Denmark
- Princess Eugénie of Sweden (1830–1889), daughter of King Oscar I
- Princess Eugenie of York (born 1990), member of the British royal family

== Eugenia ==
- Princess Eugenia of Hanover (born 2001), daughter of Heinrich Prinz von Hannover
- Princess Eugenia Maximilianovna of Leuchtenberg (1845–1925), granddaughter of Nicholas I of Russia
- Princess Eugenia Ruspoli (1861–1951), wife of Prince Enrico Ruspoli
