= Walter Holcomb =

Bio of preacher

Reverend Walter Benton Holcomb, also known as Walt Holcomb (July 29, 1877 – February 16, 1965), was an American Methodist evangelist and lecturer on the Chautauqua circuit during the 1900s.

== Biography ==
Walter Benton Holcomb was born on July 29, 1877, or 1878 in Winston-Salem, North Carolina. He started his religious career at the age of sixteen around 1895 around the same time as a meeting with famed evangelist Samuel Porter Jones with whom he would be closely connected. Around 1900 he started publishing a magazine called the Revival. During this time, he traveled with Jones until the latter died in 1906. Present at the death of Jones, Holcomb assisted Jones' widow in the creation of the biography, The Life and Sayings of Sam P. Jones. Holcomb also edited a compilation of Jones' sermons. He married Blanche Lamar on December 3, 1902, but she died on January 21, 1904. After that he married Sam P. Jones's daughter Julia on April 17, 1907. He traveled for a few years on the Chautauqua circuit, preaching throughout the south in places like Texas and Florida. His most popular address was called 'Holcomb's Horse Race" or "They're Off", a lecture in which he drew upon the Four Horsemen of the Apocalypse to condemn divorce, anarchy and alcoholism among other vices. In summer of 1922, he departed for a tour of Europe with stops including Germany, Belgium, Poland, Prague. His talks in Prague resulted in the book "Modern Evangelism and Ancient Environment." In 1936, he made a similar Asian tour of Korea, Japan and China. On August 8, 1928, Holcomb recorded four sermons for the Okeh Records company in Atlanta, Georgia. The four titles were "Safety First", "House of Prayer", "Hearts Aglow" and one other with title uncertain. Only "Safety First" and "House of Prayer" were issued as Okeh 45262. In 1945, he preached throughout Central and South America and made a return in the early 1960's to hold revivals in Lima, Peru and Buenos Aires, Argentina. Despite a 1955 heart attack, he remained active into the sixties, often involving himself in the political issues of the day, such as racism and the election of John F. Kennedy, especially regarding his Catholicism. Holcomb died on February 16, 1965, with a funeral on February 19. He was buried in Oak Hill Cemetery, Cartersville.

== Obscenity trial ==
Holcomb was embroiled in controversy in 1908 over some uncouth remarks made at a Cartersville, Georgia, revival meeting. On September 29, 1907, French Oliver was due to make a men-only sermon at 3:30 pm, after Holcomb's 11:00 am sermon, but many women mistakenly showed up. The women were pressed to leave by Holcomb but there was resistance due to pouring rain outside. In the process, Holcomb made a statement towards a woman of larger proportions which caused the controversy as well as perhaps other alleged statements. He was indicted for "use of obscene language in presence of ladies" by the Bartow County Grand Jury. Discussion continued throughout February with both Sam Jones Jr., son of Holcomb's former mentor, and the Tabernacle Association program committee (composed of Cartersville ministers) springing to his defense. He pleaded not guilty but was found guilty in June and had his appeal rejected in October. He career continued almost unscathed after that and he continued his work long after the courts' decision.

== Pastorates ==
Holcomb was assigned to the Tampa, Florida, Hyde Park Methodist Church pastoral position in 1926 and served there until 1929. He then served at Trinity Church, Miami until 1931. Whilst in Miami, he aided in a crusade against gambling and other issues throughout the city. In 1931 he moved to Memphis, Tennessee's Madison Height's Methodist Church until 1933 when he left for Decatur, Georgia. In 1936 he moved operations to Atlanta, first as pastor of Calvary Methodist Church and then at Wesley Memorial Church starting in 1940. He remained there for two years.

== Education ==
Holcomb studied at Randolph-Macon College and Cumberland University with further work at the universities of Chicago and Harvard. He was given an honorary doctorate of divinity from Centenary College and honorary alumni status from Emory University where he had given a lecture series which was turned into his 1955 book, The Gospel of Grace.
