= William Harrell Felton =

American politician (1823–1909)

Member of the U.S. House of Representatives from Georgia's 7th district
- In office March 4, 1875 – March 3, 1881
- Preceded by: Pierce M. B. Young
- Succeeded by: Judson C. Clements

Member of the Georgia House of Representatives
- In office 1851–1853
- In office 1884–1890

Personal details
- Born: June 19, 1823 near Lexington, Georgia
- Died: September 24, 1909 (aged 86) Cartersville, Georgia
- Resting place: Oak Hill Cemetery
- Party: Democratic (Independent)
- Spouse: Rebecca Latimer
- Education: University of Georgia; Medical College of Georgia

William Harrell Felton (June 19, 1823 – September 24, 1909) was an American politician, army surgeon, and Methodist minister. Felton was elected to three terms of office to the United States House of Representatives as an Independent Democrat, where he served as a sharp critic of commercial and financial interests and the return to the gold standard.

Felton's wife was Rebecca Latimer Felton, who later became the first woman to serve in the United States Senate, albeit for only one day.

== Biography ==
=== Early years ===
William Harrell Felton was born on June 19, 1823, near Lexington, Georgia. Felton studied at the University of Georgia in Athens, from which he graduated in 1843. He then studied at the Medical College of Georgia in Augusta for a year before spending the next seven years in Cartersville, Georgia practicing medicine, teaching, and farming.

In 1851, the year his first wife, Mary Anne Carlton, died, he was elected as a member of the Georgia House of Representatives, representing Cass County (now called Bartow County). In October 1853, he married his second wife, Rebecca Ann Latimer; they lived at his plantation just north of Cartersville, Georgia. They had five children, one daughter and four sons. Only one, Howard Erwin Felton, survived childhood. In the aftermath of the Civil War, their plantation was destroyed. Because they were now unable to rely on slave labor as a means of producing income, Felton returned to farming as a way to earn income until there was enough money to open a school. The Feltons opened Felton Academy in Cartersville, where they both taught.

He was ordained as a Methodist minister in 1857, and served as a surgeon in the Confederate States Army during the American Civil War.

=== Political career ===
In 1874 Felton ran for the United States House of Representatives in Georgia's 7th Congressional District, located in the Northwestern part of the state. Felton ran as a reform-oriented Independent Democrat, winning election over the electoral opposition of the conservative Bourbon Democrats who dominated Georgia state politics. Felton's campaign was aided by the efforts of his wife, Rebecca Latimer Felton, who helped direct his political campaign and contributed political commentary, frequently pseudonymous, to the daily and weekly press around the state.

Felton took a radical political line in the 1874 race, declaring that farmers and factory workers were being exploited by a corrupt and wasteful government. In response, Felton advocated that Georgia's common people should "hurl the public plunderers from office" and instead elect those who were representatives of "the whole people."

Felton was supportive of the Grange movement, although he himself never joined the organization. Nor did he choose to join the Greenback Labor Party, instead remaining within the Democratic Party, which retained hegemonic control over Southern politics in the years after the overthrow of Reconstruction.

Despite his refusal to join the formal organization, Felton shared a number of the key ideas of the Greenbackers. In November 1877 coming out strongly for the repeal of the Resumption Act which restored the gold standard, charging that the tight money economy with which it was associated served to turn "monopolists, corporationists, national bondholders, and the money changers" into "the unchallenged lords of the country." Felton was also sharply critical of the country's banking establishment and the financial system, which he accused of being "a deliberate conspiracy on the part of the creditor class to rob, defraud, and impoverish the debtor class."

Felton ran for re-election in 1876 and 1878, winning election both times. He was joined in Congress in 1878 by a fellow Independent Democrat, attorney Emory Speer of Athens, who had served previously as Georgia's Solicitor General.

An attempt to win a fourth term of office in 1880 was unsuccessful, however, with his supporters charging that voting "irregularities" had certainly taken place in Rome and possibly in Marietta, Georgia — two key county seats in Felton's district. Despite these protestations, Felton did not choose to contest the result of the 1880 election, instead returning to his farm and his ministerial work.

In 1884 Felton once again won election to the Georgia House of Representatives, where he would serve until 1890.

=== Death and legacy ===
Felton died on September 24, 1909, and was buried in Oak Hill Cemetery in Cartersville, Georgia Thirteen years after his death, in 1922, his 87 year-old widow became the first woman to serve as a United States Senator, though only for a single day.

== Footnotes ==
U.S. House of Representatives
Preceded by Pierce M. B. Young	Member of the U.S. House of Representatives from Georgia's 7th congressional district March 4, 1875 – March 3, 1881	Succeeded by Judson C. Clements
