= Possum Trot Church =

Coordinates: 34°18′21.5″N 85°15′12.5″W

Possum Trot Church was built around 1850 in Rome, Georgia, United States, and was appropriated by Martha Berry as a Sunday school in 1900. The school grew to become Berry College. The original church building still stands on the Berry campus.

== Early years ==
The Possum Trot Church is known as the "cradle of Berry College." It was first built around the 1850s. The old church was appropriated by Martha Berry for the Possum Trot Sunday School in 1900. Possum Trot was a school from 1900 to 1954. The needs of the people at Possum Trot, and places like it, inspired her to build schools to help the local children learn how to use their talents and resources better. Miss Berry's title, "The Sunday Lady of Possum Trot," originated from her teaching Sunday school at the church.

In the early 1930s, three schoolrooms that matched the rustic setting were added and the grammar grades were moved there from the log cabin area on the main campus. Children of faculty and staff and the Possum Trot children attended classes together. These children studied under the able teaching of Mrs. Fred (Elsie Andrews) Ford, who had previously taught at both the Mountain School and at the grammar school in the log cabin area.

Miss Berry didn't have bibles for the children. Instead, she painted murals on the walls. To this day, the walls still proclaim, "The eyes of the Lord are in every place beholding the evil and the good."

== The later years ==
During World War II and for a short period following, from 1942 to 1948, the Possum Trot school was closed. It reopened in 1948 with Elizabeth Daniels Taylor as teacher and James Daniels as industrial arts teacher. Later Mrs. Samuel Poe Carden taught at Possum Trot until the school was closed in 1954.

One of the classrooms was renovated by the Berry College Student Government Association as a Mountain Day American Bicentennial project in 1976. Student interest in Possum Trot has remained high over the years, and in 1984-85 and 1985–86, the Student Government Association assisted through volunteer work in the full restoration of the buildings. With the assistance of the physical plant of Berry College and with alumni volunteers led by Newton Wagner, a Possum Trot graduate, the safety and preservation of this historic complex have been assured.

== Homecoming ==
Possum Trot Homecoming is held each year on the third Sunday in September with "dinner on the grounds" between "preaching" at 11 a.m. and "singing" in the afternoon. The public is always welcome to bring their own dinner and participate in this event.

There is a small log house located behind the church. It once served as the home economics department and as the kitchen and dining hall for the Possum Trot School. This cottage had started to fall apart due to lack of use until it caught the eye of an enterprising industrial education student, Robert Plank, from Gettysburg, Pennsylvania, who offered to restore it in exchange for its use as a residence for himself and his wife until he graduated. His offer was accepted, and upon his graduation in 1976, it became staff housing.
