= Tom Ryman =

American riverboat captain (1841–1904)

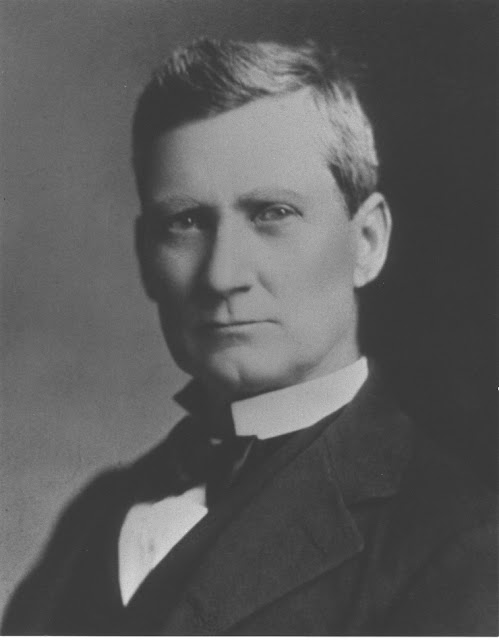
- Born: Thomas Green Ryman; October 12, 1841; Tennessee, U.S.
- Died: December 23, 1904 (aged 63); Nashville, Tennessee U.S.
- Other names: Capt. Ryman; Capt. Tom; Tom Ryman; T.G. Ryman
- Occupations: Riverboat captain Businessman
- Years active: 1865–1902
- Known for: Ryman Auditorium
- Spouse: Mary Elizabeth Baugh

Thomas "Tom" Green Ryman (October 12, 1841 – December 23, 1904), known as Capt. Tom Ryman, was a riverboat captain and riverboat company owner and businessman from Tennessee. He built the Union Gospel Tabernacle, later known as the Ryman Auditorium, a live performance venue and National Historic Landmark in Nashville, which is named in his honor.

== Early life ==
Ryman was born south of Nashville, the oldest male child of Capt. John Ryman and Sarah "Sallie" Ryman's five children, three older sisters and a younger brother.

== Career ==
In 1864, Ryman followed his father into the riverboat business and bought his first steamer. He started three river businesses that he consolidated into the Ryman Line in 1885. At its peak, his Nashville-based fleet consisted of more than 30 boats, making him one of the most successful steamboat men on the Cumberland River. He also owned a waterfront saloon, at one time the largest in the city.

== Union Gospel Tabernacle ==
After hearing the Rev. Sam Jones speak at an outdoor tent revival meeting in Nashville in 1885, Ryman proposed the construction of a tabernacle that would allow the people of Nashville to attend large-scale revivals indoors. Ryman had attended one of Jones' 1885 revivals with the intent to heckle, but was instead converted into a devout Christian, and soon after pledged to build the tabernacle.

Construction took seven years to complete and cost US$100,000 (equivalent to $3,583,333 in 2025). However, Jones held his first revival at the site on May 25, 1890, with only the building's foundation and six-foot (1.8 m) walls standing. Architect Hugh Cathcart Thompson designed the structure. Exceeding its construction budget, the tabernacle opened US$20,000 (equivalent to $716,667 in 2025) in debt. Jones sought to name the tabernacle in Ryman's honor, but Ryman denied the request several times. After Ryman's death, the Tabernacle was renamed in his honor.

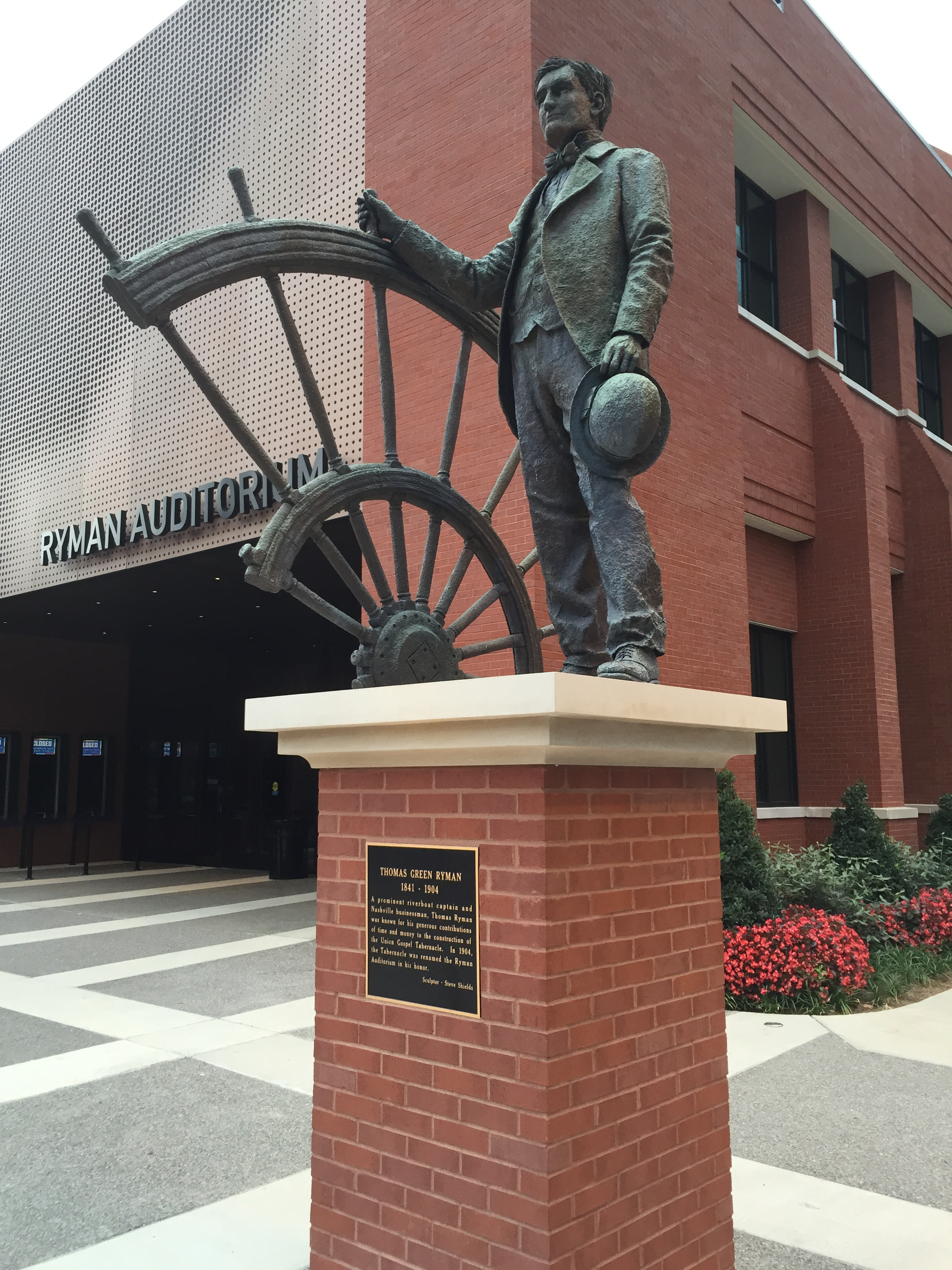
Thomas Ryman Statue at the Ryman Auditorium

== Personal life ==
In 1869, Ryman married Mary Elizabeth Ryman (née Baugh). They had seven children.

== Death and funeral ==
Ryman died in 1904 at his home in Nashville. An estimated 4,000 people attended his funeral, held at the Tabernacle on Christmas Day. The Rev. Jones spoke at the service and once more proposed changing the Tabernacle's name to the Ryman Auditorium. He asked all who agreed with the suggestion to rise. According to The Nashville American's December 26, 1904, account of the service, "as one person, the thousands who heard him were on their feet." Tom Ryman's final resting place is in Mount Olivet Cemetery (Nashville).

== See also ==
- Ryman Auditorium
