= Bill Arp =

American politician (1826–1903)

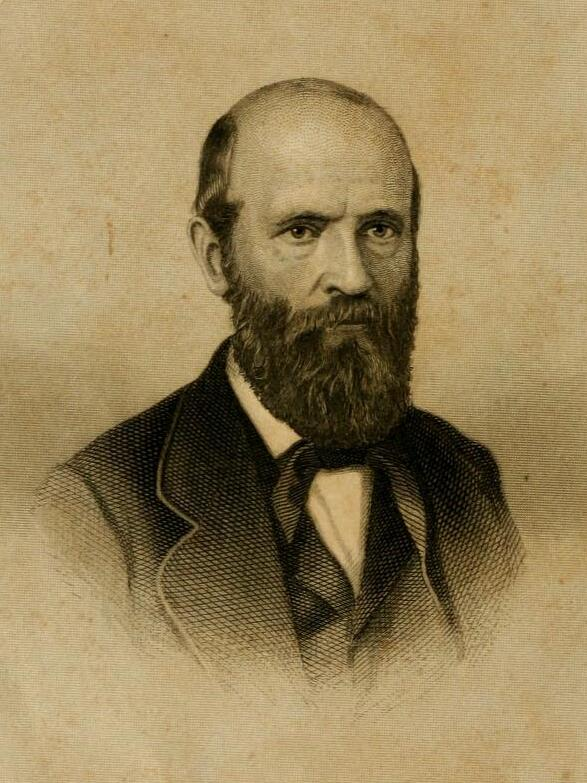
- Born: Charles Henry Smith; June 15, 1826; Lawrenceville, Georgia
- Died: August 24, 1903 (aged 77); Cartersville, Georgia
- Resting place: Oak Hill Cemetery
- Education: University of Georgia (did not graduate)
- Occupations: Author, editor, politician

Charles Henry Smith (June 15, 1826 – August 24, 1903) was an American writer and politician from the state of Georgia. He used the pen name Bill Arp for nearly 40 years. He had a national reputation as a homespun humorist during his lifetime, and at least four communities are named for him (Arp, Banks County, Georgia; Bill Arp, Georgia; Arp, Texas; and Arp, Tennessee). Interspersed among Smith's nostalgic reveries of simpler times in the South were forceful endorsements of white supremacy, the institution of slavery, and the practice of lynching.

== Life and career ==
=== Early life ===
Charles Henry Smith was born on June 15, 1826, in Lawrenceville, Georgia. He attended Franklin College (now the University of Georgia), and married Mary Octavia Hutchins, the daughter of a wealthy lawyer and plantation owner. Their family grew to include 10 children who survived to adulthood. Smith studied law with his father-in-law, was admitted to the bar, and became an attorney in Rome, Georgia, where he lived at Oak Hill before selling it to Andrew M. Sloan. (Sloan later sold the estate to prominent Rome resident Thomas Berry in 1871.)

At the beginning of the American Civil War, Smith wrote his first humorous letter under the Bill Arp pseudonym. Others were published by Southern newspapers intermittently throughout the war. They pleaded the case for the Southern cause while joking about the hardships of white Southerners in wartime. Meanwhile, Smith served as a major in the 8th Georgia Infantry Regiment and on the staffs of several Confederate generals, including Francis Bartow.

=== Career ===
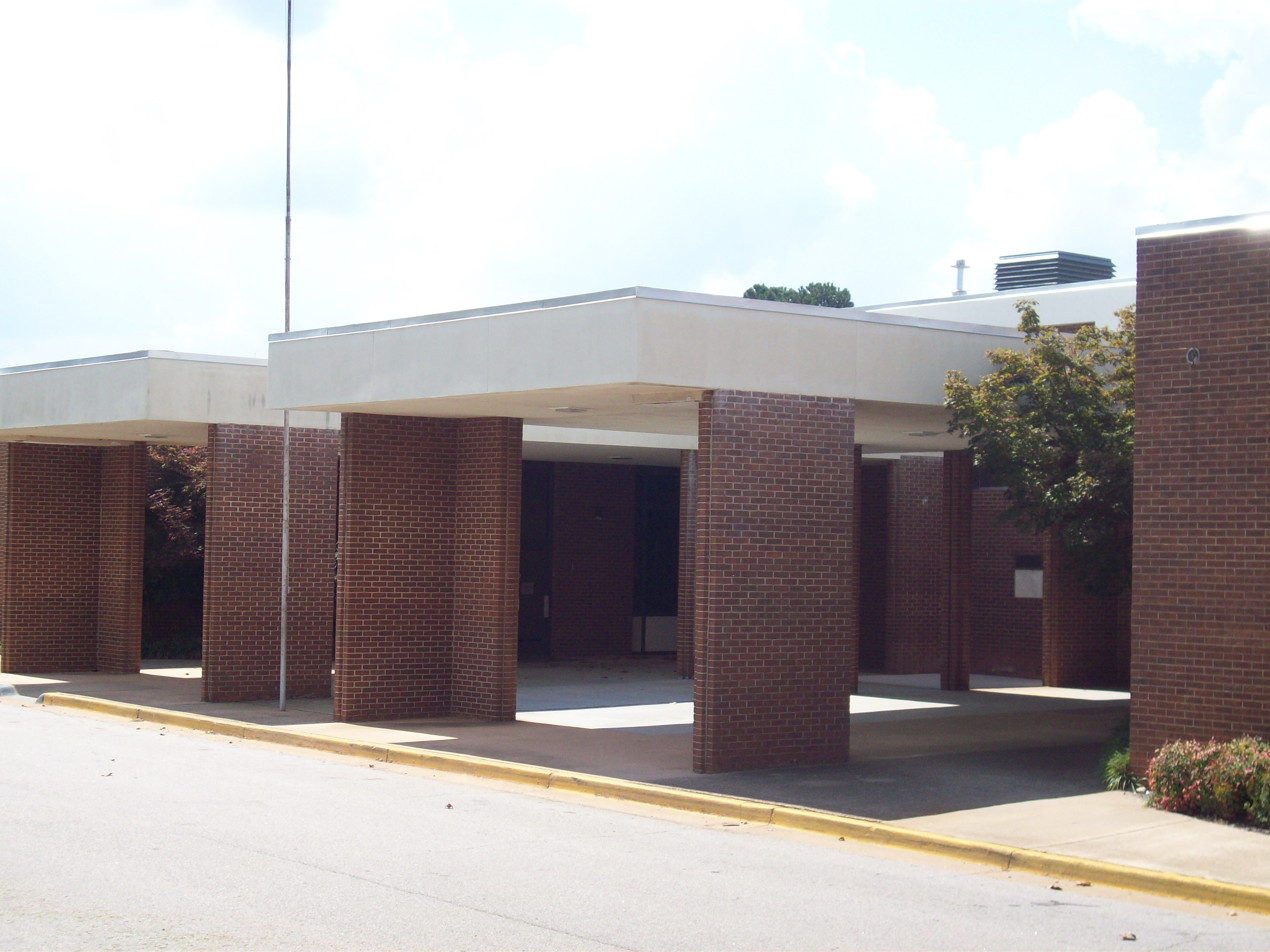
The former Bill Arp Elementary school, currently used as Board of Education Building in Douglas County, Georgia

After the war, Smith returned to Rome, but later moved to the nearby city of Cartersville, Georgia, living there after 1877. Active in politics, he served as alderman, mayor, and a member of the Georgia State Senate.

Smith's literary career thrived after the war, and letters that he wrote as "Bill Arp" to the editor of the Atlanta Constitution earned him a position as a columnist for the newspaper. He typically wrote in "Cracker dialect" about politics, government, current events, race relations, farming, and other topics. He edited newspapers in Rome and Cartersville, Georgia and Atlanta and published five books: Bill Arp's Letters (1870), Bill Arp's Scrap Book (1884), The Farm and Fireside (1891), A School History of Georgia (1893), Bill Arp: From the Uncivil War to Date (1903). He also wrote a monthly column for the Southern Cultivator. As his fame grew, Smith became a successful lecturer and speechmaker.

=== Racial Attitudes ===
Modern historians, particularly Smith's biographer David B. Parker, identify “Bill Arp” as a key figure in the development of the Lost Cause mythology that would dominate perceptions of the Southern Confederacy for decades to come. Smith was distressed by the changes he perceived in postwar Southern society, and consistently used his columns to contrast what he saw as the venality of contemporary attitudes to those of the antebellum era in a way that went beyond simple nostalgia. “For Bill Arp, the legacy of the Old South was a willingness to work, a strong sense of morality, and an ability and desire to be self-reliant. The New South, on the other hand, was indolence, an attitude fostered by the educational system, the ready availability of get-rich-quick schemes, and the general acceptance of a philosophy that emphasized the end (wealth) over the means. The New South also meant immorality, as seen in the rising divorce and crime rates.”

Essential elements of Smith’s worldview included his insistence on white supremacy and his stalwart defense of the institution of slavery. In both his Bill Arp newspaper columns and in books and articles published under his own name, Smith insisted that Black people belonged to an “inferior race,” and that nature had intended whites to rule over them. In an 1893 column he wrote, “For thirty years the negro has been deluded with the idea that his is not an inferior race, and that he should be set up side by side socially and otherwise with the whites. This will never be done. It is against nature and shocks the sentiment of our civilization.”

A frequent topic of Arp’s newspaper columns was the futility of efforts to educate Black people. Writing in 1885, he stated, “I have never favored the higher education of the negro. His race is physically ordained for labor, muscular labor, and he likes it… the African, the black negro, was by nature and nature's God created and fitted for labor rather than for college or the theater or the fine arts.”

Arp was firm in his defense of the institution of slavery, writing, “There was no sin in slavery as instituted in the South by our fathers and forefathers.” The many revered biblical figures who were said to own slaves provided Arp confirmation that the practice met with divine approval. The enslaved Africans brought to America, Arp argued, were fortunate to escape their “native jungles,” where they ran the risk of “becoming the prey for stronger tribes (or) food for cannibals.” Smith’s defense of slavery extended to the sexual exploitation of enslaved Black women by white men, which he portrayed as consensual and even desirable. In an 1893 article written under his own name, Smith wrote, “Before the War, the marriage-relation among the negroes was kept almost inviolate. When it was broken, it was broken by the white man. The result was the mulattoes, whom the slave-woman was proud to claim, and she felt no dishonor. Since the day when Abraham took his servant Hagar for his concubine, the inferior race has always aspired to such association with the superior.”

The ending of slavery, Arp claimed, was directly responsible for what he perceived as a pattern of general lawlessness among younger Black men: “Our slaves were educated by fear of the lash or the whipping post, and you can pick them out today. It is their children, born since the war, or their grandchildren who are in the chain gang.”

Arp’s increasing focus on perceived Black immorality and lawlessness, and the danger he contended that “black brutes” posed to society, reached a point where he would be described as one of lynching’s major proponents. Several modern historians have singled him out as one of the most vocal defenders of the practice. Although he wrote in defense of lynching as early as 1884, Arp returned to the topic with increasing vehemence in his later columns. Writing in 1902, he declared, “Verily reconstruction was worse than war. But it is all over now, thank the good Lord, and we can attend our reunions and carry our flowers to the graves and build our monuments and put the corner stone for Winnie Davis and lynch the niggers that assault our wives and daughters… And as for lynching, I repeat what I have said before, ‘Let the good work go on. Lynch 'em! Hang 'em! Shoot 'em! Burn 'em.’”

Eventually, Arp argued, drastic action would be required to resolve what he termed the “Negro problem.” “I know and feel that the white people of the South have been kind; yes, overkind to the negro since the war and that Yankee emissaries have alienated him from us and we have got no thanks for all we have done. Sooner or later we will have to take away his vote and establish the whipping post and then, and not till then, will we have peace between the races.”

=== Death ===
Smith died on August 24, 1903, in Cartersville, Georgia, where he is buried at Oak Hill Cemetery.

== See also ==
- Literature of Georgia (U.S. state)
