= Eugenia Ruspoli =

American socialite and Italian aristocrat

Princess Eugenia Ruspoli
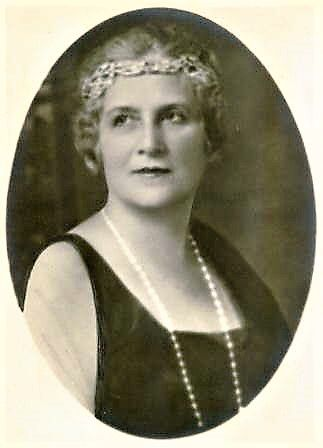
- Born: Jennie Enfield Berry; 1861; Etowah County, Alabama, U.S.
- Died: 1951 (aged 89–90); New York City, New York, U.S.
- Noble family: Ruspoli (by marriage)
- Spouses: Henry Bruton; Prince Enrico Ruspoli

Princess Eugenia Ruspoli (born Jennie Enfield Berry; 1861–1951) was an American socialite who married into the Italian aristocracy.

== Biography ==
Ruspoli was born Jennie Enfield Berry in 1861 to Thomas Berry and Frances Margaret Rhea Berry in Etowah County, Alabama. She was brought up at Oak Hill, the family home near Rome, Georgia. She had a sister, Martha Berry. In her youth, she traveled and studied in Europe.

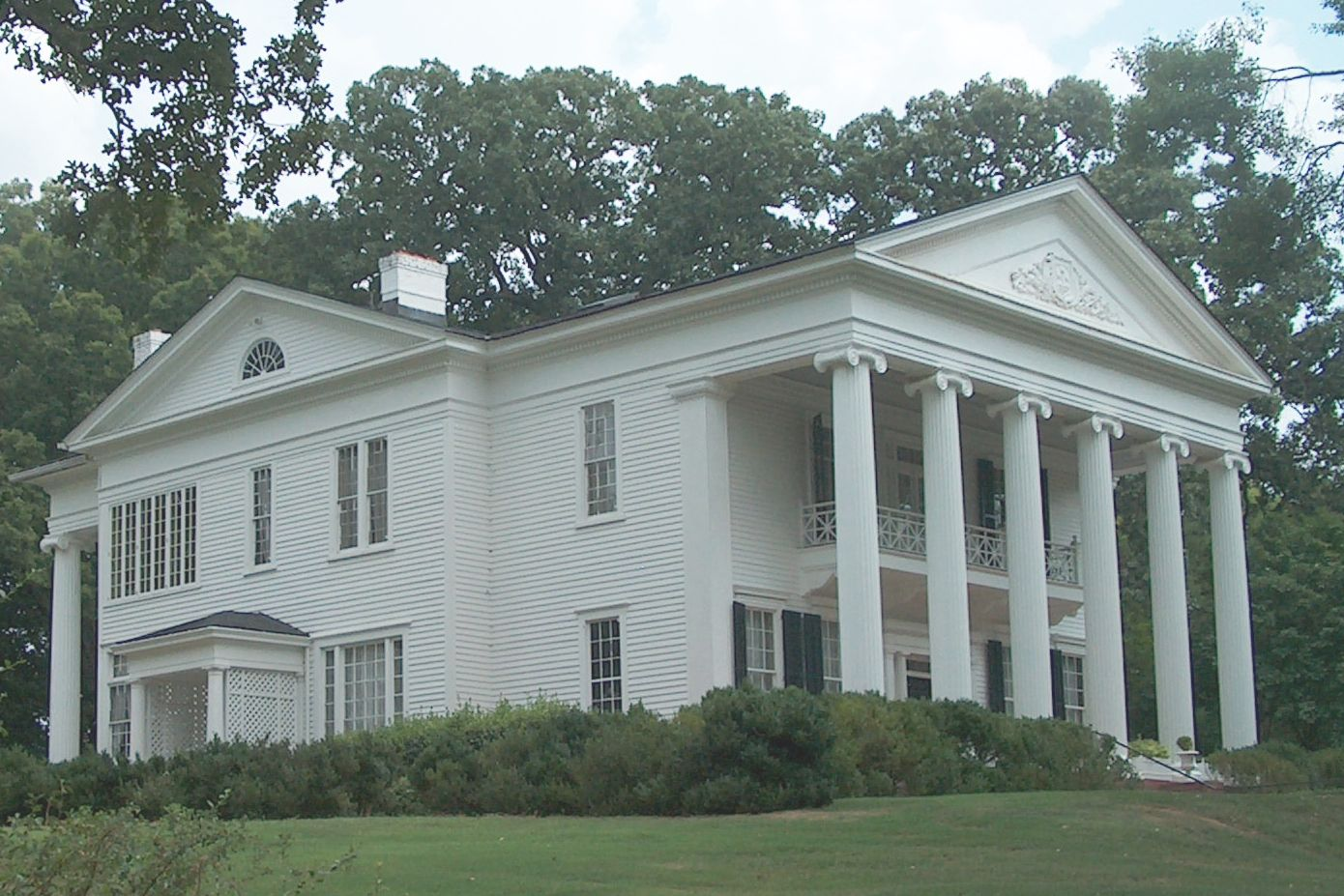
Oak Hill, Ruspoli's childhood home

After living abroad, she returned to the United States and married Henry Bruton, a tobacco manufacturer from Nashville, Tennessee, on May 7, 1889. During her marriage, she became a prominent society figure in Tennessee, hosting various events. Her husband died in 1892 and she returned to Europe with a significant inheritance. On March 2, 1901, she married Prince Enrico Ruspoli, a member of the House of Ruspoli, in a ceremony officiated by Monsignor Sebastiano Martinelli, the Papal Nuncio in Washington, D.C. Upon her marriage, she changed her name from Jennie to Eugenia. After the wedding, the couple returned to Italy and purchased Castle Nemi from the Orsini family, located twenty miles south of Rome. She became a known figure in Italian high society and within art and religious circles.

Her second husband died in 1909. Despite a verbal agreement that the family's castle would remain in her possession, her husband left all property to his family. She took the case to court and, in 1916, obtained the title of the castle and all personal property within it.

Ruspoli returned to the United States following widowhood, taking up residence in New York City. In 1929, she adopted a British girl named Maria-Theresa. At the outbreak of World War II, Ruspoli shipped antique furniture, paintings, and sculptures from her castle to her sister, Martha, at Oak Hill.

Eugenia died in her home in New York City in 1951.
