= Oak Hill Cemetery (Cartersville, Georgia) =

Cemetery in Cartersville, Georgia, USA

Details
- Established: 1838
- Location: Cartersville, Georgia, United States
- Coordinates: 34°10′40″N 84°48′30″W
- Type: Public
- Find a Grave: Oak Hill Cemetery

Oak Hill Cemetery is a cemetery in Cartersville, Georgia, United States. The cemetery was established in 1838 and bought by the city of Cartersville in 1850 from the Ebenezer Methodist Church (now the Sam Jones Memorial United Methodist Church). The cemetery is still open and available for new interments. The cemetery was also known simply as the Town Cemetery.

== Notable interments ==
- Amos T. Akerman, U.S. Attorney General
- Rebecca Latimer Felton, first woman U.S. Senator
- William Harrell Felton, U.S. Representative from Georgia
- Walter Holcomb, Methodist preacher
- Samuel Porter Jones, Methodist preacher
- Charles Henry Smith, humorist better known as Bill Arp
- Pierce M. B. Young, U.S. Representative from Georgia, major general in the Confederate States Army

== Bibliography ==
- Knight, Lucian Lamar (1914). Georgia's Landmarks, Memorials, and Legends. Vol. II. Atlanta: The Byrd Printing Company – via Google Books.
- Spencer, Thomas E. (1998). Where They're Buried: A Directory Containing More Than Twenty Thousand Names of Notable Persons Buried in American Cemeteries, with Listings of Many Prominent People who Were Cremated. Clearfield Company. ISBN 978-0-8063-4823-0 – via Google Books.
