= Pierce M. B. Young =

Confederate Army general

Pierce Manning Butler Young
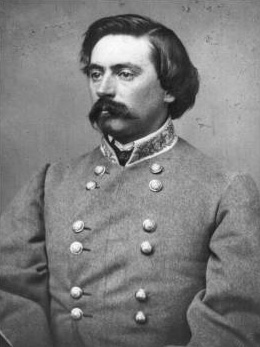
- Major General Pierce M. B. Young

Member of the U.S. House of Representatives from Georgia's 7th congressional district
- In office July 25, 1868 – March 3, 1869
- Preceded by: Vacant
- Succeeded by: Vacant
- In office December 22, 1870 – March 3, 1875
- Preceded by: Vacant
- Succeeded by: William H. Felton

Minister to Honduras
- In office November 12, 1893 – May 23, 1896
- Preceded by: Romualdo Pacheco
- Succeeded by: Macgrane Coxe

Minister to Guatemala
- In office June 12, 1893 – May 23, 1896
- Preceded by: Romualdo Pacheco
- Succeeded by: Macgrane Cox

Consul General of the United States St. Petersburg, Russia
- In office 1885–1887

Personal details
- Born: November 15, 1836 Spartanburg, South Carolina
- Died: July 6, 1896 (aged 59) New York City
- Resting place: Oak Hill Cemetery
- Occupation: Lawyer

Military service
- Allegiance: Confederate States of America
- Branch/service: Confederate States Army
- Years of service: 1861–1865
- Rank: Major General
- Commands: Young's Cavalry Division; Young's Cavalry Brigade; Cobb's Legion
- Battles/wars: American Civil War: Maryland Campaign; Gettysburg campaign; Bristoe Campaign; Mine Run Campaign; Overland Campaign; Carolinas campaign

Pierce Manning Butler Young (November 15, 1836 – July 6, 1896) was an American soldier, politician, diplomat, and slave owner. He was a major general in the Confederate States Army during the American Civil War, and after the war a four-term United States Congressman from Georgia, before serving in the diplomatic corps.

== Early life and career ==
Young was born at Spartanburg, South Carolina, on November 15, 1836. His father, Dr. R. M. Young, was a son of Capt. William Young, a soldier in the American Revolution under George Washington. Young's maternal grandmother descended from the Cavaliers of England, who migrated to Maryland around the 1740s. She married Mourning Stone, who was a Loyalist during the American Revolution, and helped to give refuge to Lord Cornwallis during his campaign in South Carolina. When Pierce was a small boy, his father moved to Bartow County, Georgia, and enlisted private tutors for his children. At the age of thirteen, Young entered the Georgia Military Institute in Marietta, and graduated in 1856. He subsequently briefly studied law. In 1857, he was appointed to the United States Military Academy but resigned only two months before graduation due to Georgia's secession.

== Civil War ==
Returning home in early 1861, he was appointed second lieutenant in the 1st Georgia Infantry regiment, but declined that commission for the same rank in the artillery. In July, he was promoted to first lieutenant and was attached to the staff of General Braxton Bragg at Pensacola, Florida. He was at the same time aide-de-camp to Gen. W. H. T. Walker. In July, Young was appointed adjutant of the Georgia Legion, better known as Cobb's Legion, and was promoted to major in September and to lieutenant colonel in November, commanding the cavalry portion of the legion.

Young's cavalry was attached to Wade Hampton's brigade of J. E. B. Stuart's cavalry division in the Army of Northern Virginia in 1862. He was distinguished for "remarkable gallantry," as Stuart expressed it, in the Maryland Campaign. Promoted to colonel, he rendered brilliant service at the Battle of Brandy Station and participated in the cavalry operations of the Gettysburg campaign. In early August, he was wounded in another fight near Brandy Station. In October, he was promoted to brigadier general and assigned command of Hampton's old brigade, consisting of the 1st and 2nd South Carolina cavalry regiments, the Cobb Legion, Jeff Davis Legion and Phillips' Legion. He was actively engaged during the Bristoe and Mine Run Campaigns, where on October 12, 1863, by adroit maneuvering, he compelled an enemy division to recross the Rappahannock River. An admiring Stuart reported, "The defeat of an expedition which might have proved so embarrassing entitles the officers who effected it to the award of distinguished skill and generalship."

In 1864, Young played a prominent part in the Overland Campaign in Virginia, and when Hampton assumed command of the cavalry after Stuart's death at Yellow Tavern, he temporarily took Hampton's place as division commander. In November, Young was sent to Augusta to gather reinforcements and aid in the defense of that city, threatened by William T. Sherman. Promoted to major general in December, he was actively engaged in the defense of Savannah and the 1865 campaign in the Carolinas under General Hampton until the close of the war.

== Postbellum career ==
After the war, he returned to Georgia and lived as a planter. He was elected to the US House of Representatives, as a Democrat for four terms (1868-1875). Young ran for a fifth term, but was defeated by the Grange-backed candidate William Harrell Felton. Young was appointed United States commissioner to the Paris Exposition in 1878. He served as consul-general at St. Petersburg, Russia (1885–87) and as Envoy Extraordinary and Minister Plenipotentiary to Guatemala and Honduras (1893-1896) by appointment of President Grover Cleveland. Young died on July 6, 1896, in New York City, with interment in Oak Hill Cemetery, Cartersville, Georgia. He had been living in an old country home, which had been purchased by his father, to the west of Cartersville.

== See also ==
- List of American Civil War generals (Confederate)

U.S. House of Representatives
Preceded by American Civil War	Member of the U.S. House of Representatives from Georgia's 7th congressional district July 25, 1868 - March 3, 1869	Succeeded by Reclaimed seat
Preceded by Self, seat vacated	Member of the U.S. House of Representatives from Georgia's 7th congressional district December 22, 1870 - March 3, 1875	Succeeded by William H. Felton
Diplomatic posts
Preceded by Romualdo Pacheco	United States Minister to Guatemala; June 12, 1893–May 23, 1896	Succeeded by Macgrane Coxe
Preceded by Romualdo Pacheco	United States Minister to Honduras; November 12, 1893–May 23, 1896	Succeeded by Macgrane Coxe
