= Samuel Porter Jones =

American methodist

Sam P. Jones
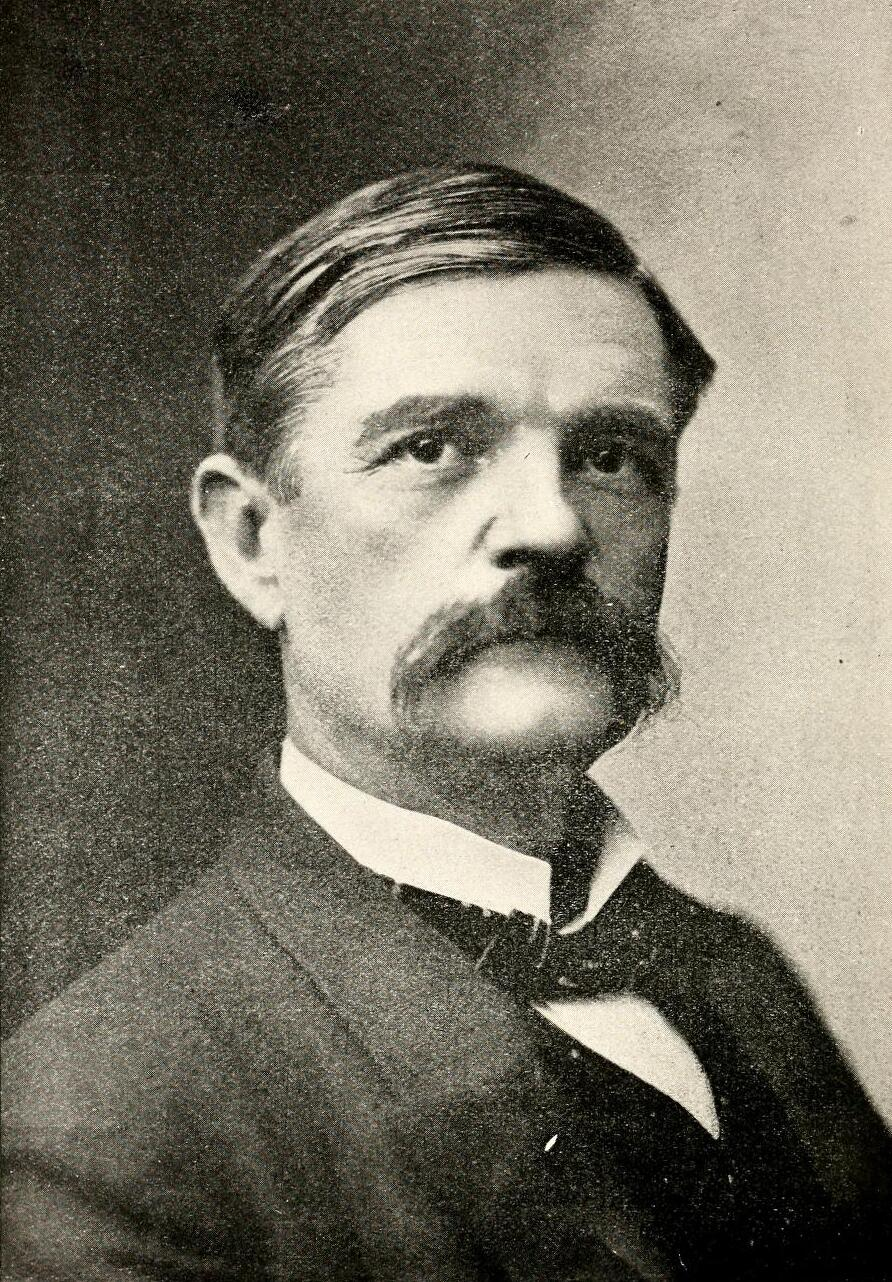
- Born: October 16, 1847; Oak Bowery, Alabama, U.S.
- Died: October 15, 1906 (aged 58); Perry, Arkansas, U.S.
- Resting place: Oak Hill Cemetery
- Occupation: Revivalist
- Spouse: Laura McElwain
- Children: 7
- Parent(s): John Jones; Queenie Jones

Samuel Porter Jones, best known as Sam P. Jones, (October 16, 1847 – October 15, 1906) was an American lawyer and businessman from Georgia who became a prominent Methodist Episcopal Church revivalist preacher across the Southern United States. In his sermons, he preached that alcohol and idleness were sinful. He was known for his admonition, "Quit Your Meanness."

== Early life ==
Samuel Porter Jones was born on October 16, 1847, in Oak Bowery, Alabama. His father, John Jones, was a lawyer and real estate entrepreneur. His mother, Queenie Jones, was a homemaker. His paternal grandfather, Samuel Gamble Jones, was a Methodist preacher. His great-grandfather was also a Methodist preacher. Additionally, four of his uncles were Methodists. In 1855, when he was eight years old, his mother died, and he moved with his father to Cartersville, Georgia.

During the American Civil War of 1861-1865, Jones joined up with union troops traveling to Kentucky. Upon his return, Jones studied the Law, was admitted to the Georgia bar in 1868, and became known locally as a brilliant lawyer; however, Jones was a notorious alcoholic. After his father died, Sam Jones had a great and miraculous experience of conviction and quit his drinking, and focused on his Methodist faith.

== Evangelistic career ==
Jones was ordained as a Methodist preacher by the North Georgia Conference of the Methodist Episcopal Church, South. He became a traveling circuit preacher in October 1872, tending the Van Wert circuit, a group of five churches spread over four counties.

He became the South’s most famous evangelist and preacher in the late nineteenth century. He aimed his messages especially at men, often regarded as the most difficult demographic group to reach. His evangelistic style was considered coarse, daring and even admirable, as in this contemporaneous description “Sam Jones is a remarkable man. Uneducated and in many respects absolutely ignorant, he has the faculty of striking that chord of nature that makes him one with the audience before him, which he sways with a wasteful hand. The terseness of his language is bold and biting, and in a vague sort of way calls to mind the exhortations and anathemas of the stern old Jewish prophets. How absurd yet striking was an expression made by this wild preacher in the course of a sermon on honesty! Said he: 'God will put his angels on half rations rather than see an honest man starve.' On another occasion he apostrophized the rich men of the community and reproached them for their grasping miserliness. 'Why,' said he,'you men could be tolled to hell by laying a nickel every ten feet along the path!' Such phrases, which in many cases are almost vulgar, give an air of sensation to his meetings…” In 1885, he headlined a revival in Nashville, Tennessee, where he converted Thomas Green Ryman, who, along with Jones built the Union Gospel Tabernacle, later named Ryman Auditorium (home to the Grand Ole Opry) after Ryman's death. In 1886, at his own expense, he had a large open-air structure called "The Tabernacle" built for interfaith meetings. Until his death in 1906, he held services there each September, bringing to his hometown the co-workers who assisted him in the great revivals he held throughout the country.

Meanwhile, Jones raised funds for the Methodist Orphan Home in Decatur, Georgia. He went on to preach not only across the South, but also in New York City, Boston, Cincinnati, St. Louis, Los Angeles and Canada. Over the years, it is estimated that Jones preached to three million Americans. In his sermons, Jones preached that alcohol, dances, and the theater, were sinful. He became known for his admonition, "Quit Your Meanness." As an example of his preaching, once in an evangelistic Campaign in San Antonio, Texas, Jones hollered that the only difference between San Antonio and hell was that there was a river running down the middle of it.

== Personal life ==
Jones married Laura McElwain of Kentucky. They resided at Roselawn, a mansion in Cartersville, Georgia. By 1895, the two-story house had been lifted up with an enormous first floor added underneath. Also on the property were a schoolhouse, greenhouse, smokehouse, a large carriage house, tennis court and small houses for servants. They had seven children, though one died as an infant.

== Death and legacy ==
On October 15, 1906, the eve of his 59th birthday, Jones was returning home from a revival when he died. His body was first laid at the rotunda of the Capital in Atlanta. He was buried at Oak Hill Cemetery in Cartersville, Georgia.

At the time of Jones’ death, the sanctuary of what was then named Cartersville Methodist Episcopal Church was in the process of being completed. After a unanimous vote, the congregation officially changed the name of the church to Sam Jones Memorial Methodist Church (now known as Sam Jones Memorial United Methodist Church), which is still in existence today.

== Sources ==
- Jones, Marnie. Holy Toledo : Religion and Politics in the Life of 'Golden Rule' Jones. Lexington: The University Press of Kentucky, 2015.
- Jones, Samuel Porter. Sam Jones' anecdotes and illustrations related by him in his revival work. Chicago: Rhodes & McClure, 1888.
- Jones, Samuel Porter. Sermons and sayings. First series. Nashville, Tenn. : Southern Methodist Pub. House, 1885.
- Jones, Samuel Porter. Thunderbolts: Comprising most earnest reasonings, delightful narratives, poetic and pathetic incidents, caustic and unmerciful flagellation of sin. Nashville, Tenn.: Printed for Jones and Haynes, 1896.
- Stuart, George R. Famous stories of Sam P. Jones : reproduced in the language in which Sam Jones uttered them. New York : Fleming H. Revell, 1908.
- Stuart, George R. Sam P. Jones, the preacher. Siloam Springs, Arkansas: International Federation Publishing Company, 1900?.
