= Oak Hill & The Martha Berry Museum =

Museum in Rome, Georgia

Oak Hill-Berry Museum
- Oak Hill
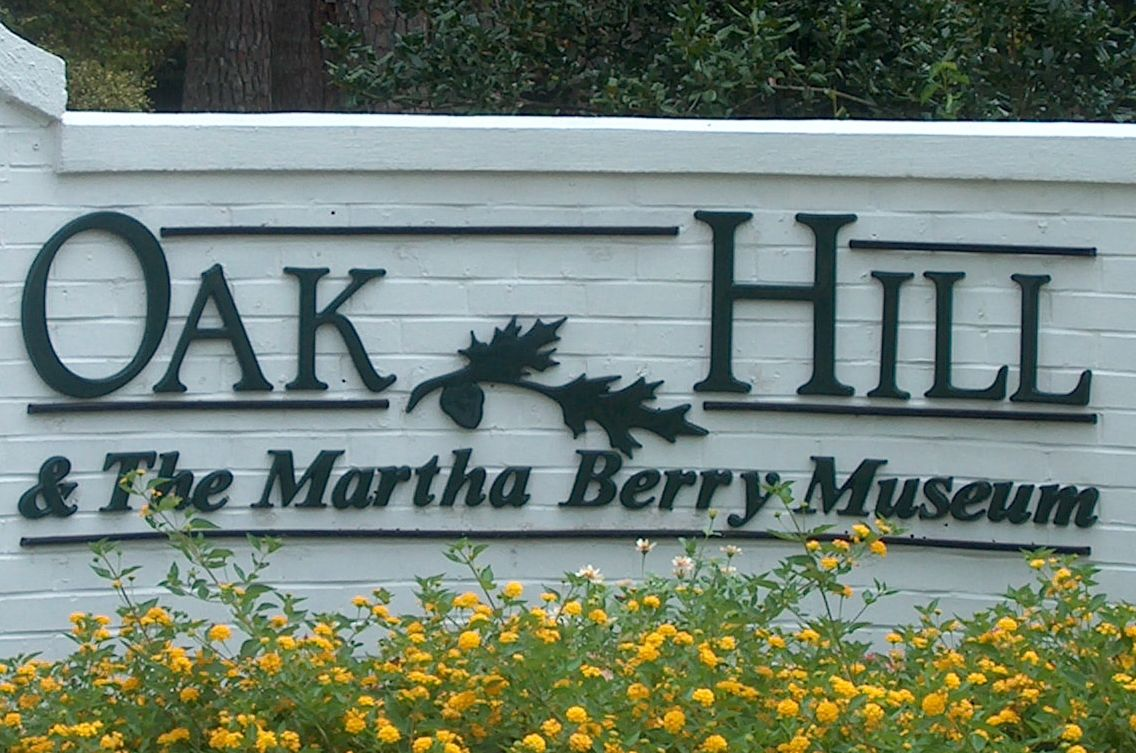
- Gate Entrance to Berry Museum.

- 34.280037, -85.181408
- Established: 1884 (original farmhouse in 1847)
- Location: 24 Veterans Memorial Hwy; Rome, Georgia, United States
- Coordinates: 34.280037°N 85.181408°W
- Website: http://www.berry.edu/oakhill/

Oak Hill & The Martha Berry Museum is the home and museum about Berry College founder Martha Berry located in Rome, Georgia, United States. It is also an All-America Selections Display Garden, a part of Berry Schools on the National Register of Historic Places, and a AAA Star Attraction.

== Oak Hill ==
Oak Hill is a 170-acre (0.69 km^{2}) estate Greek revival mansion. Oak Hill was an original Victorian-style farmhouse that was built in 1847. During the American Civil War and the capture of Rome during The Atlanta campaign, the estate was used by the Union soldiers as a place to stay. Charles H. Smith, whose widely known pen name was Bill Arp, owned the estate before he sold it to his colleague Andrew M. Sloan. Thomas Berry and his family moved to Rome, Georgia from Alabama in 1868 to become a partner in Berrys and Company, a wholesale grocery and cotton brokerage business. Around 1871, his business became successful, and Thomas Berry decided to move to a better place so he purchased the estate from Sloan for $9,000. Thomas and his family: his wife Frances Margaret Rhea, his eight children, and his late brother James' three orphaned children moved into the farmhouse. In 1884, after the farmhouse caught fire and burned down, Thomas rebuilt and restored it as a Greek-style Revival home, named Oak Hill.

Thomas' will stated that he left his possessions, home, and 160-acre (0.65 km^{2}) estate to his eight children to be sold, and for the money to be divided equally among his children after the deaths of his wife & himself. Martha Berry urgently desired to keep the house as her home, her schools, and symbol of her triumphs and tragedies. In October 1927, her family sold their shares of the Oak Hill estate to her, and she in turn deeded the estate to The Berry Schools, for five dollars.

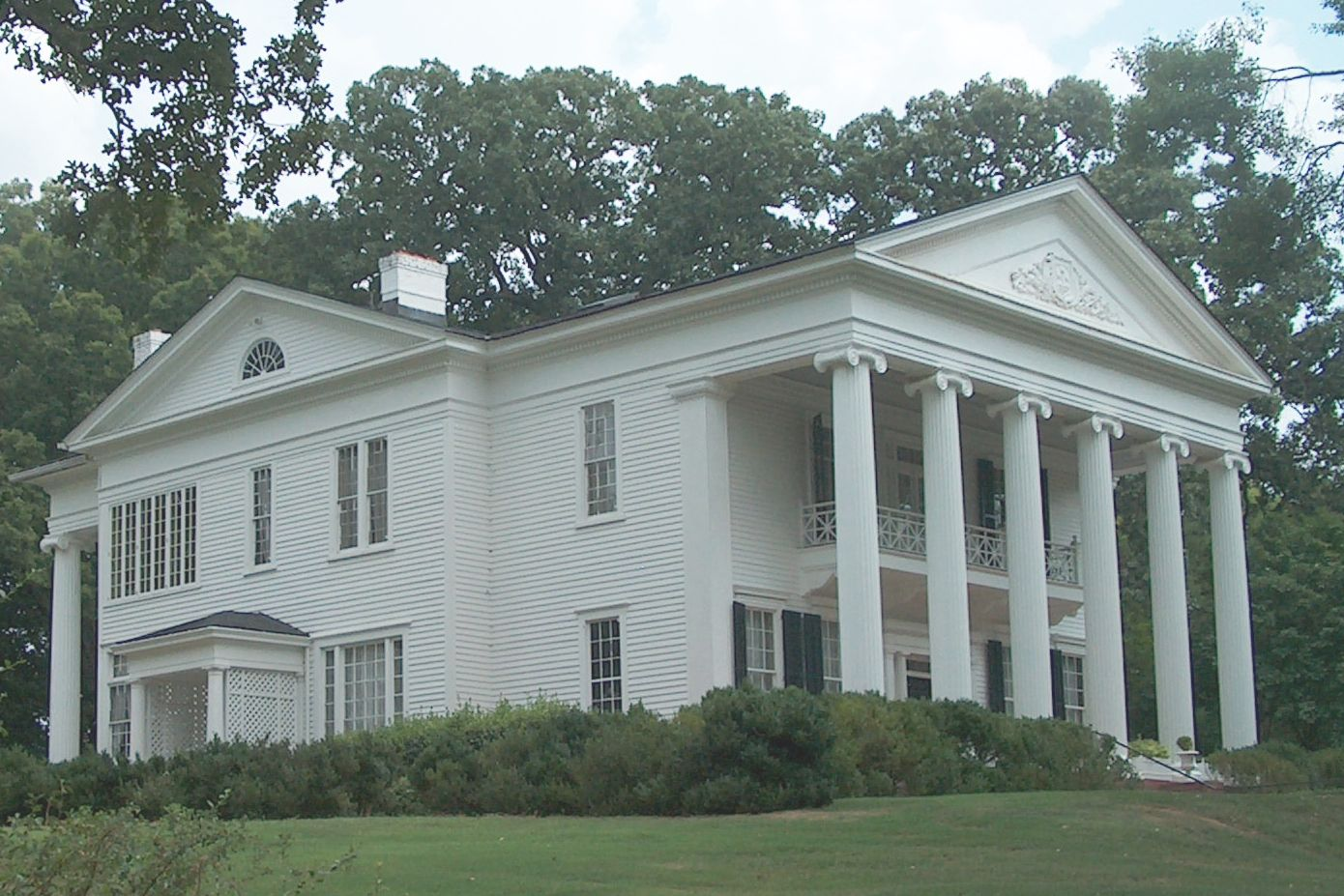
Oak Hill.

Once Oak Hill Estate was transferred to The Berry Schools, Martha decided to make home improvements, and hired the Boston architectural firm Coolidge & Carlson, who had built the Ford Complex and an addition onto the chapel on the Berry College campus. In the course of 1927-1928 renovations, the interior of the house was stripped down to the studs and replaced with plaster walls. A decorative element in the hallway was a long case clock, a reproduction of an eighteenth-century colonial-style piece made by Berry Schools industrial arts teacher Frank Gottshall. Electricity and indoor plumbing were added as part of the renovation. Six and half bathrooms were installed to replace the outhouse located behind the house, as well as steam heating, as the house was "almost impossible to heat with open fireplaces". Included in the renovation were the "new" parlor, kitchen, pantry, library, 1930s elevator, two bedrooms, portico on the rear of the house, and large addition to the back of the house beyond the two columns at the end of the hallway.

Significant changes included combining the dining room and parlor into one room, adding the bay window and Chinese Chippendale mirror, to serve as a social hub. The dining room was relocated down the hall where the former master bedroom was. The dining room's wallpaper is the Isola Bella print (a wood-block print) that was popular in the 1920s. The same wallpaper can be found today in the governor’s mansion in Tallahassee, Florida. The colonial-style furniture in the dining room was made by the Berry students under the direction of same teacher who did a hallway case clock. The kitchen and pastry areas served as entrance way for the students and the maid to get to the dining room to serve the guests. The kitchen had all new 1920 amenities such as a monitor-top refrigerator, food storage space, a bell system, stove, and cabinets.

The library, with its pecan paneling (and one of Martha's favorite rooms), was added in 1928. The decorative woodwork of the library was the same work that William F. Ross Company did on the Ford buildings. The elevator was installed in the 1930s and was donated by the Berry Alumni Association for Martha, because of a heart condition that precluded her climbing stairs. The elevator was from the floor near the kitchen and pastry to the second floor, in Martha's dressing room. Her new bedroom and dressing room were installed with the elevator area, bathroom, private screening, and simple wicker furniture of designs of the Arts and Crafts revival movement that were made by Berry students. The remodeling of Oak Hill allowed Martha a place to showcase her educational and personal philosophies to guests.

The unrenovated areas are those that were used by Berry family and students. These original rooms belonged to Martha's mother, Frances Rhea Berry; her niece, Virginia Campbell Courts; her sister, Bessie Wright, and Wright's husband, Judge Moses Wright, who served as the first Berry Industrial School for Boys trustee. They lived with her until their deaths. Another room belonged to Berry female students who worked for Martha by doing work skills.

In October 1972, the estate was opened as a museum to the public in the celebrating of Martha's 106th birthday. Oak Hill's outbuildings, Berry Gardens, bridal walk, original cabin, and Martha Berry Museum were included in the 1972 opening. The Oak Hill Gift Shop was opened 24 years later. The estate was used as a filming location for several films including Sweet Home Alabama, Perfect Harmony and Remember the Titans.

=== Martha Freeman's Cottage ===
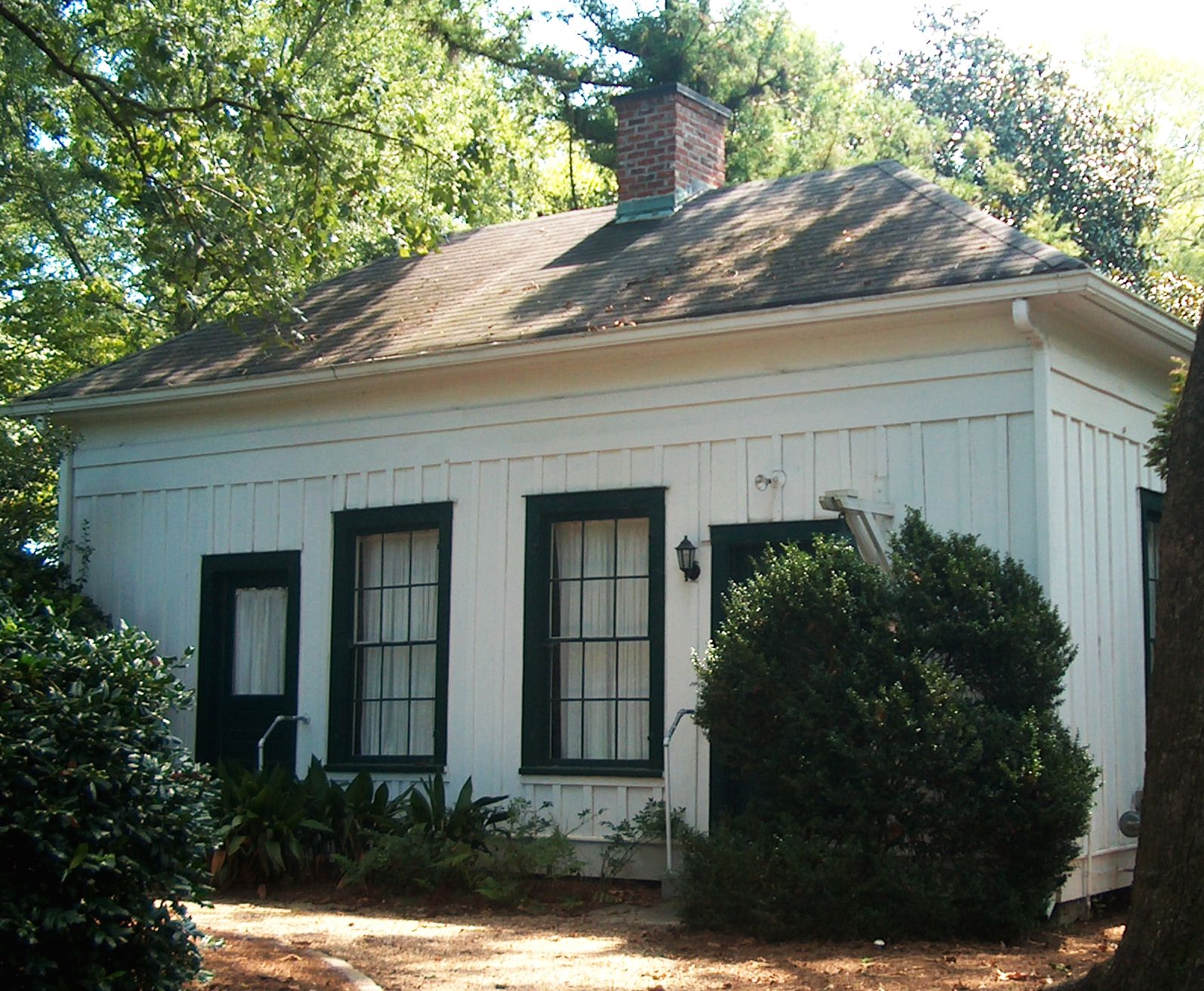
Aunt Martha's cottage.

The cottage was once a schoolhouse belonging to Martha Berry's servant and influential family friend, Martha Freeman. Martha Freeman was a former slave and married to the Berry family's carriage driver, Enoch Freeman. Martha Freeman was serving as a care-giver and houseparent of the Berry family as she raised Berry children to adulthood. After her husband died in the 1890s, Martha Freeman moved to the cottage where she continued her life helping Martha Berry, Berry students, and the creation of Berry Schools. After Martha Berry died in 1942, Martha Freeman remained and continued as the caretaker of the estate until she died in 1951. She was buried next to Martha Berry. At present, the cottage displays the rooms where Martha Freeman lived her whole life.

=== Carriage House ===
The estate's reconstructed carriage house displays the vintage vehicles that Martha Berry used until her death in 1942. She rode the carriages and cars but she never drove these cars so male student drivers and Geddins Cannon, the grounds director, drove her from place to place. Inside the carriage house are the Berry buggy, a 1914 Ford touring car, a 1917 Ford Model-T, a 1940 Mercury and a Fordson tractor. The 1940 Mercury is the last car that Martha rode in before she died.

== Oak Hill Gardens ==
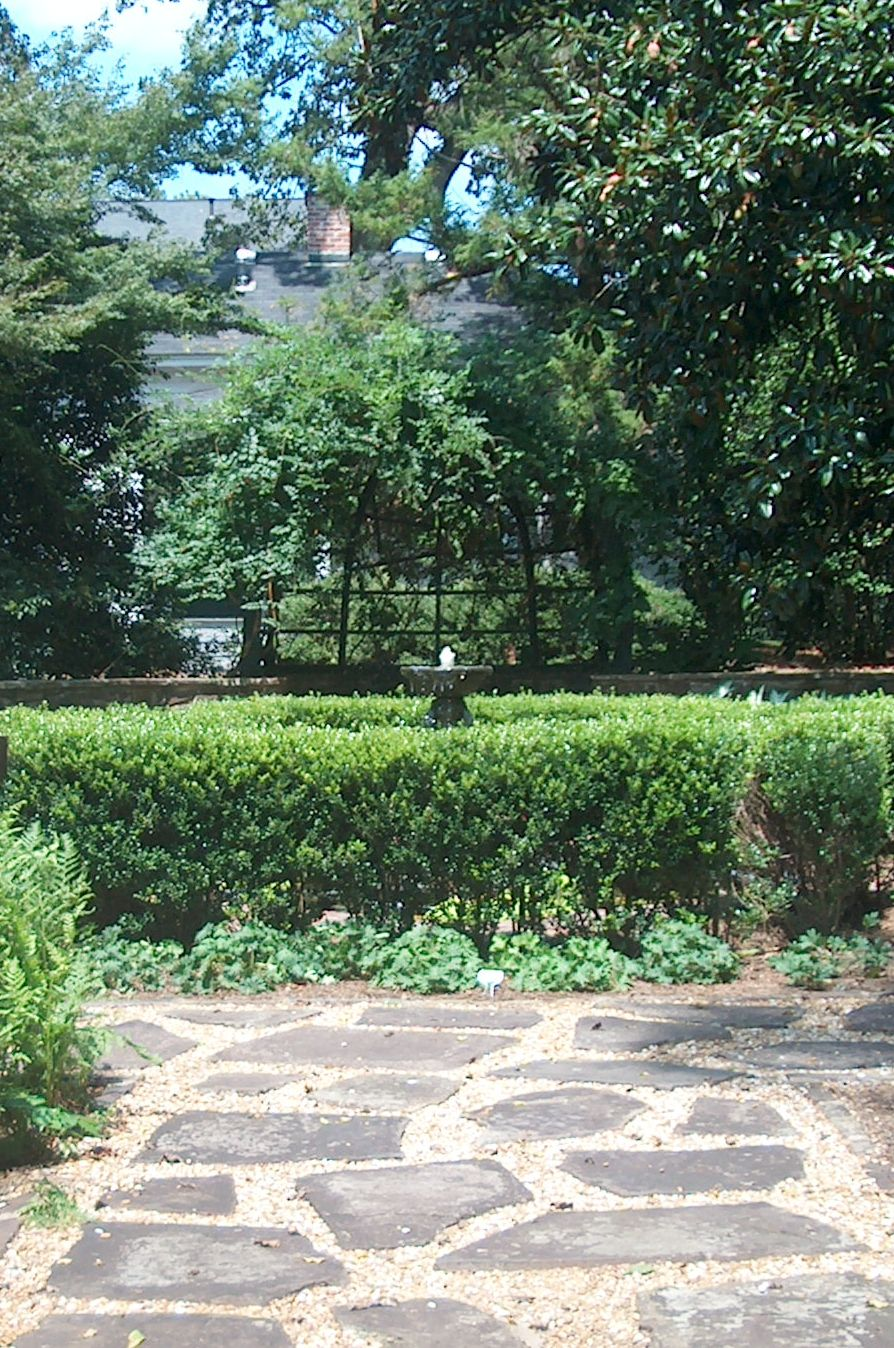
Goldfish Garden.

The gardens on the right side of the Oak Hill are Formal Garden, Goldfish Garden, Sundial Garden, and Sunken Garden. The gardens were designed by a Philadelphia landscape artist, Robert Cridland, to formalize surrounding Oak Hill during 1927 renovation. Cridland's landscaping designs represented early twentieth century landscaping trends that accompanied the revival of Colonial architecture. Formal Garden, formerly Frances Rhea Berry's garden, is the boxwood parterre in stones and curbings with spraying fountains on the pool. It is unclear if this garden was here before Martha Berry's renovation but some of the curbing and layout could have existed previously. The formal garden showcase is used for annual plantings, changing seasonally with summer annuals in the spring, Crepe Myrtles and Rose of Sharon (athea) in the summer, chrysanthemums in the fall, violas, kale, and ornamental cabbage in the winter. The formal garden's opposite side is the Goldfish Garden. The Goldfish Garden was Martha's favorite spot where she wrote the letters under the arbor on the north end and Aunt Martha used to come and feed her goldfish in the pond surrounded by beds until her death in 1951. It was constructed at the same time as the Formal Garden. Now it is used as a showcase for herbs with knot garden around the pond using dwarf barberries and dwarf boxwood. Beside the goldfish garden is the

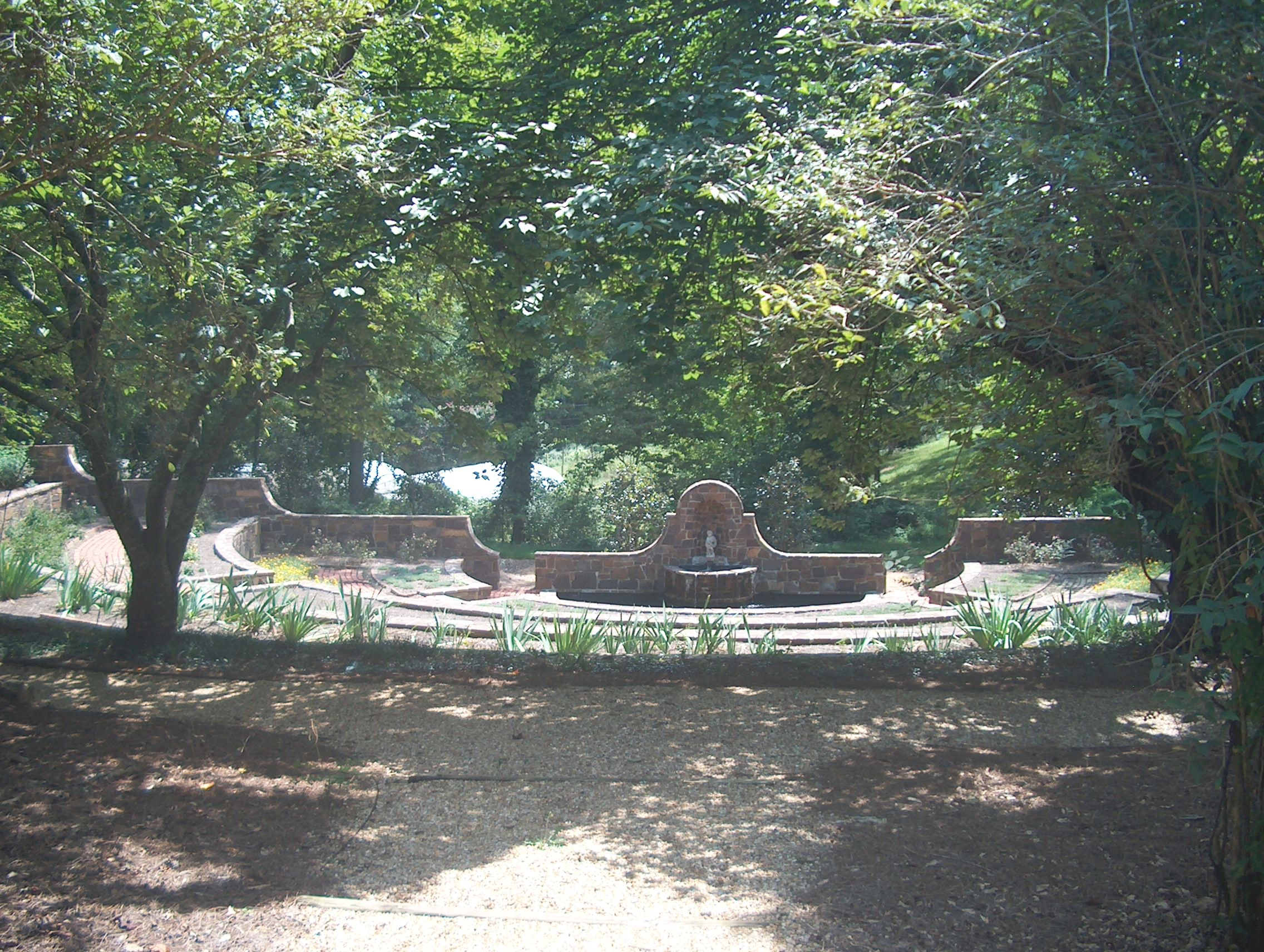
Sunken Garden.

Sundial Garden that has the actual sundial in the center of it. It was believed to be used for tea and floribunda type roses. The Sundial Garden is similar changes to the gardens as summer sunflowers, fall mums, and winter cabbage and kale. The last garden is the Sunken Garden in end of the line of gardens. The Sunken Garden was constructed in 1934 and completed in 1936 as an amphitheatre area for small concerts and entertaining but now it is a garden. Kwansan cherry trees (which were given by the Emperor of Japan in the 1930s) and collection of day lilies (given by the Georgia Day Lily Society in the 1980s) are in the garden with the changes of the seasons, annuals, and ornamental grasses (summer), mums (fall), and pansies, violas, cabbage, and kale (winter) in the beds.

== Bridal Walk ==
A Bridal Walk is located near the carriage house with a small "chapel" building beside it. It was introduced in the early 1900s for Berry newlyweds, who were invited by Martha Berry, after their wedding ceremony, to walk down to the summerhouse at the end of the walk and make their first wish at that location. Weddings were not commonplace at Oak Hill because of a private residence, but Martha urged Berry alumni and students to use the chapels on Berry College campus. The boxwoods at each trellis and roses growing over the trellis' with mondo grass on the outside of the curbing. A perennial border on the east side of the walk, utilizing peonies which were given by Clara Ford and ornamental grasses, eucalyptus, and many other flowering shrubs and perennials.

== Original cabin ==
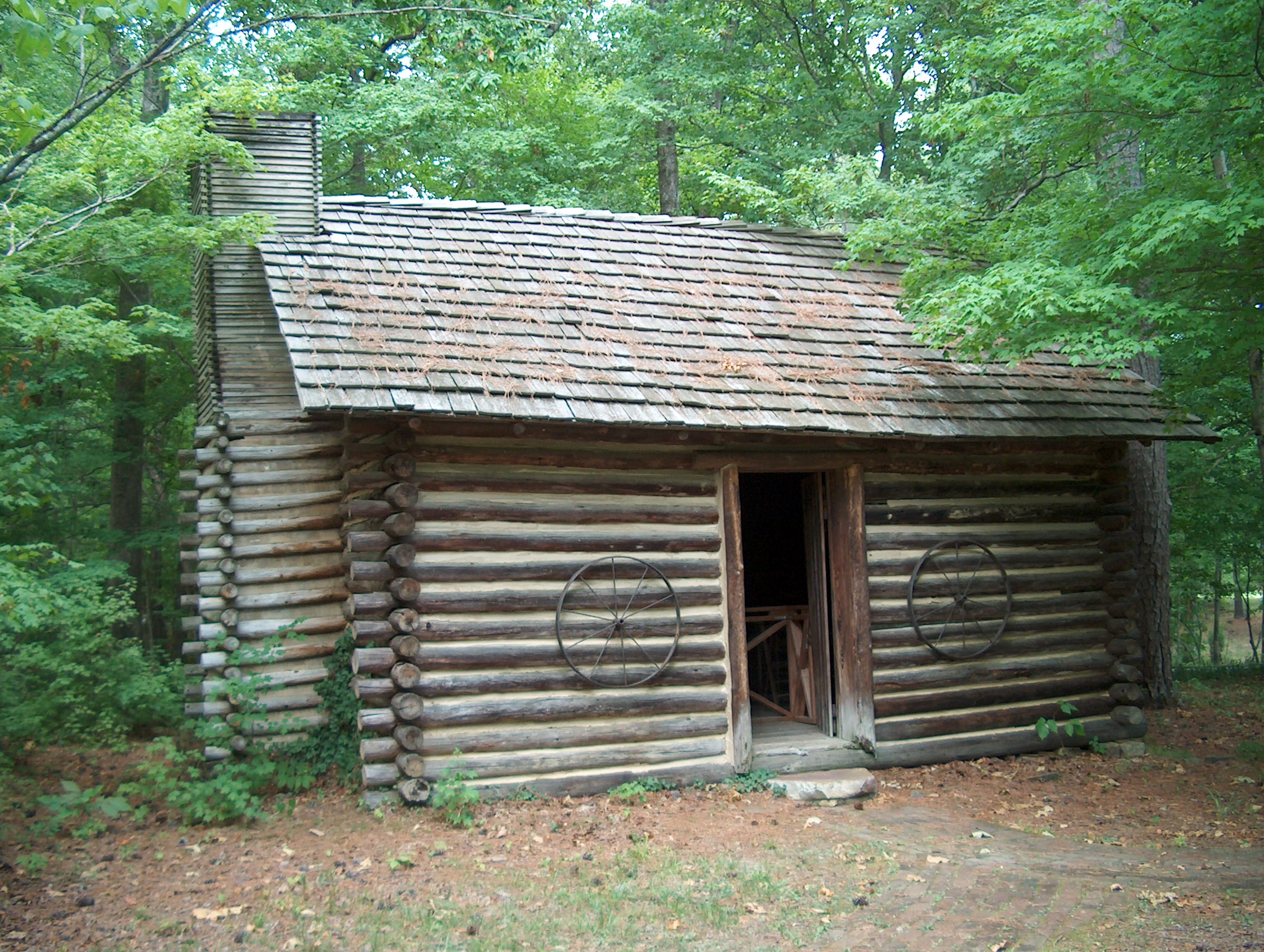
"Birthplace of Berry College" first original Berry School (Sunday School) taught by Martha Berry.

The original cabin was built shortly after American Civil War as a playhouse for Martha Berry and her brothers, sisters, and cousins when they were children. In the late 1890s, three small boys came from Lavender Mountain to this location where Martha taught Sunday School lessons. These boys were uneducated and poor that never heard the Bible. With the word of her teaching interests and kindness spreading, more people came to her for the educational learning. When the cabin became overflowing, Possum Trot day school on the Berry campus was established to continue their education. Possum Trot day school next became Berry Schools, now Berry College. The cabin was once the office for Martha before her new office was built on the Berry campus. The cabin is now a reserved site near the Martha Berry Museum as The Birthplace of Berry College.

== Martha Berry Museum and Oak Hill Gift Shop ==
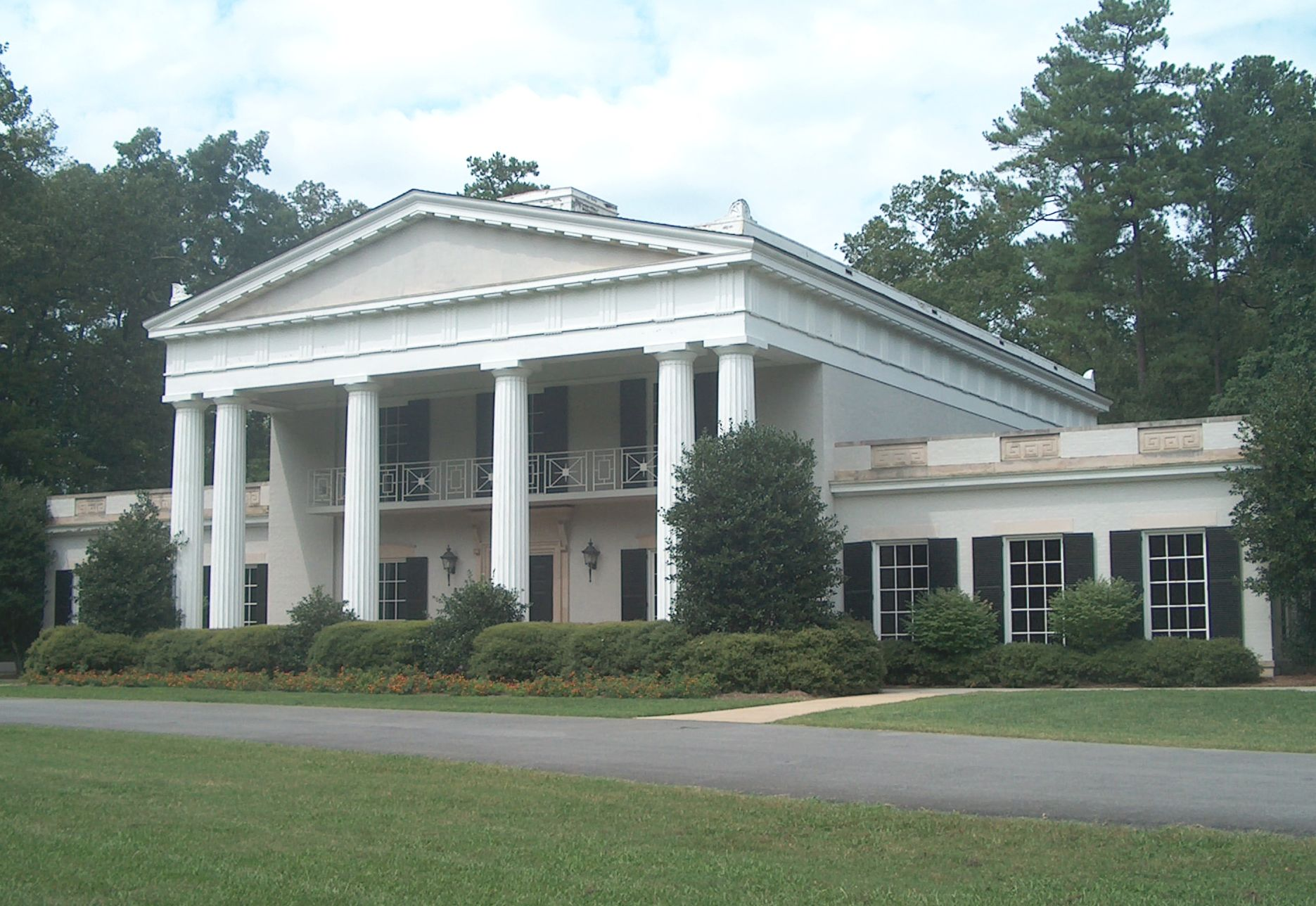
Martha Berry Museum.

Martha Berry Museum was constructed as a small portion of Oak Hill in 1972 and opened in October. It was designed by Atlanta architect Samuel Inman Cooper. The museum has displayed dozen of famous persons' paintings including Henry Ford and Theodore Roosevelt in the lobby and the permanent exhibit that traces the history of Berry Family and the evolution of the Berry Schools into Berry College and temporary exhibits in the back on the first floor. The second floor is presenting the art collection of Martha Berry's sister Eugenia and her husband Prince Enrico of Italy. The collection includes paintings by both Italian and American artists and spans nearly 1000 years of art. The offices of museum directors are located on each of front end between the front door. The small gray cottage was built in 1846, and was acquired by the Berry family in 1928. It originally served as the Oak Hill gate house, where the first main entrance is. It was also the home to Martha's brother, Isaac "Ike". In 1995, it was moved to its present location behind the Martha Berry Museum. The cottage has been restored, renovated, and enlarged back to life. It was opened in 1996 and serves as the Oak Hill Gift Shop. The arbor entry, garden, and picket fence were introduced to the cottage as a presentation. The garden was used for teaching techniques in landscaping and display for All America Selections introductions as well as one of three display gardens in Georgia.

== See also ==
- Berry College
- Martha Berry
- History of Rome, Georgia
