= Martha Berry =

American educator (1865–1942)

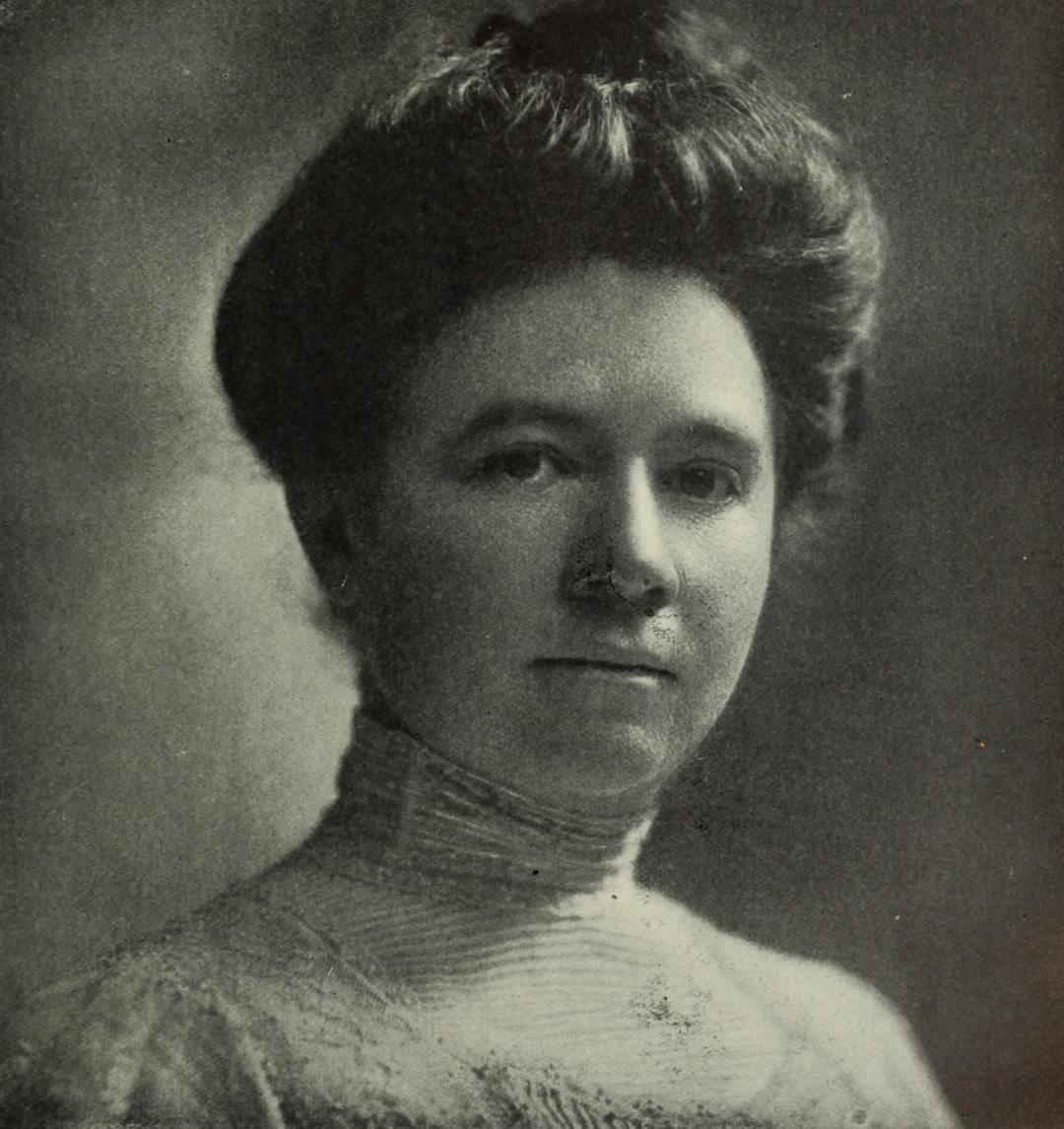
- Martha Berry, founder of Berry College
- Born: October 7, 1865; Jackson County, Alabama, US
- Died: February 27, 1942 (aged 76); Atlanta, Georgia, US
- Occupation(s): Berry College founder, Educator
- Relatives: Eugenia Ruspoli (sister)

Martha McChesney Berry (October 7, 1865 – February 27, 1942) was an American educator and the founder of Berry College in Rome, Georgia.

== Early years ==
Martha McChesney Berry was the daughter of Capt. Thomas Berry, a veteran of the Mexican–American War and American Civil War, and Frances Margaret Rhea, a daughter of an Alabama planter. Berry was born on October 7, 1865, in Berry Cove in Jackson County, Alabama, but her family relocated to Rome, Georgia, when she was an infant. Thomas Berry was a partner in Berrys and Company, a wholesale grocery and cotton brokerage business in Rome.

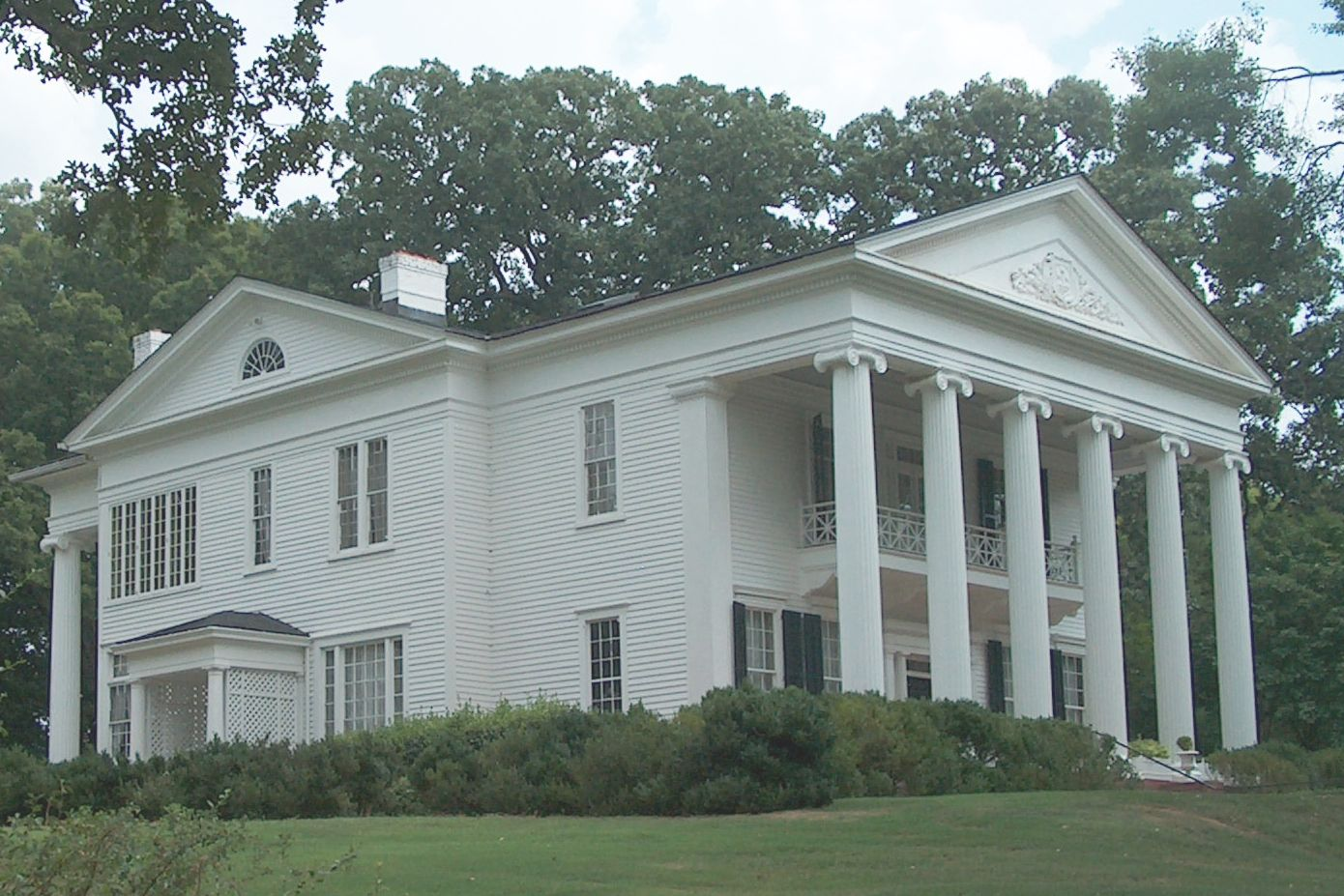
Oak Hill, home of Berry College founder Martha Berry

In 1871, he purchased Oak Hill, a 116-acre (0.47 km^{2}) working farm on the Oostanaula River, approximately one and one-half miles north of Rome. Miss Berry grew up in this home along with her five sisters, including Eugenia, two brothers, and three orphaned cousins. Her early education was conducted through private tutors. She attended the Edgeworth School, a finishing school in Baltimore, Maryland; it was the only formal education she received. Martha Berry lived at Oak Hill for the remainder of her life.

== Berry Schools ==
The founding of the Berry Schools was inspired by Berry's desire to help the children of poor landowners and tenant farmers in Georgia who did not have access to quality education. As a consequence of this desire, Martha Berry never married, and she devoted her life to developing the schools that would eventually become Berry College.

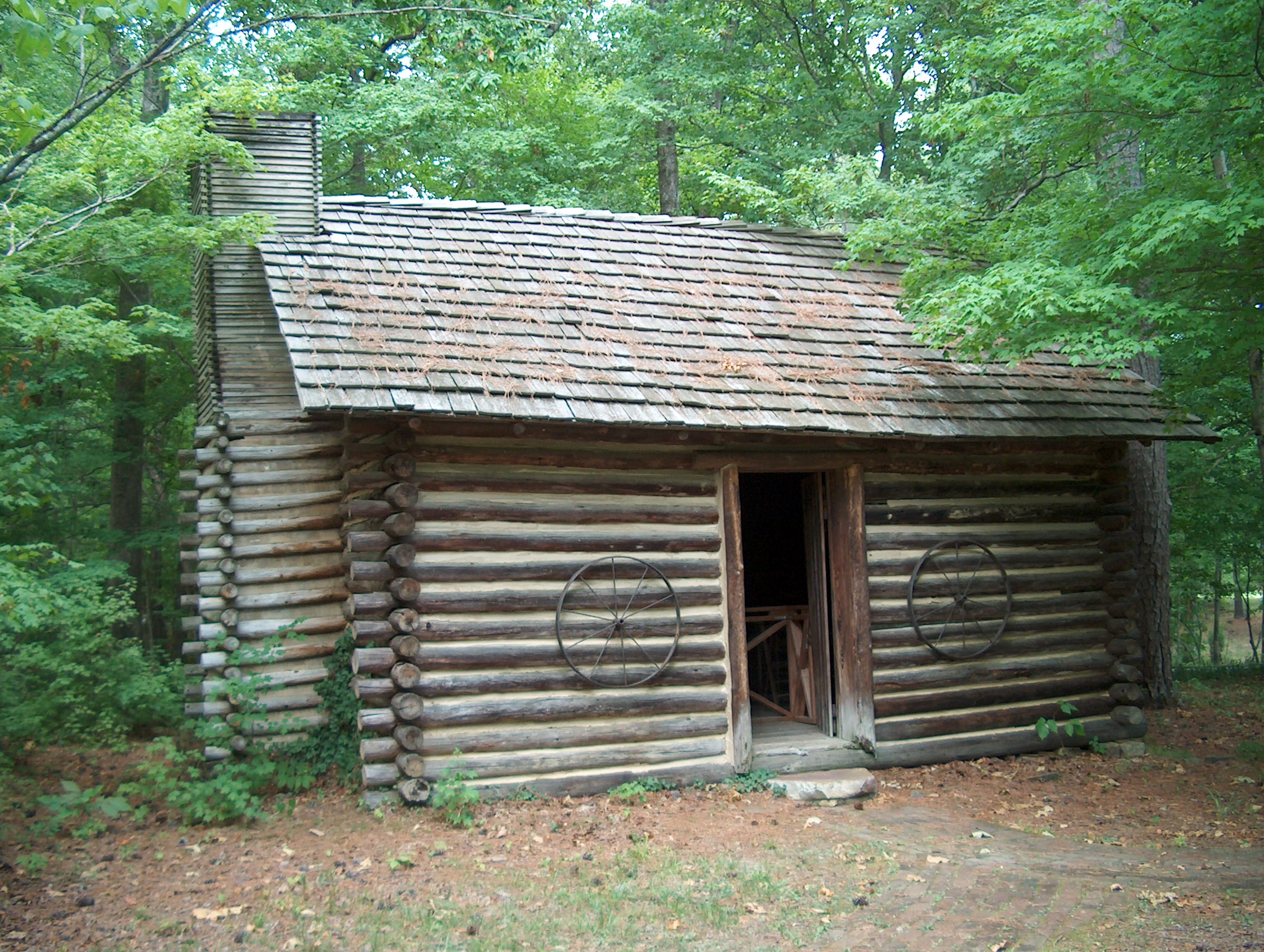
Berry School, founded by Martha Berry

In the late 1890s, she constructed a small, whitewashed school on 83 acres given to her by her father, and began to teach Sunday school classes to local children. She also taught in an abandoned Possum Trot Church, which still stands on the Berry College campus.

=== Boys' and girls' schools ===
The Sunday school classes eventually turned into day school activities, and Berry opened a boarding facility for boys called Boys’ Industrial School on January 13, 1902. At the time, Berry had only five boarders, but the need was apparent and in 1909 she opened the Martha Berry School for Girls. Both schools offered high school-level education and were open to those willing to study hard and work for the school. Her teachings focused on the "head, heart, and hands" of her students: The ability to learn, work and the will to do both well. Her motto, taken from the Gospel of Mark, was and still is the motto of the college "Not to be ministered unto but to minister."

=== Berry College ===
In 1926, she established Berry Junior College, which in 1930 expanded into a four-year school. Martha Berry died in 1942 and the schools were faced with several years of transition. The Martha Berry School for Girls closed at the end of the 1955–1956 academic year. The boys' high school was renamed Mount Berry School for Boys, and in 1962 it became Berry Academy, which was closed in 1983 when Berry College incorporated. The college now offers one of the country's largest work-study programs, enabling all of its students to work an on-campus job for their four years at the school. Berry College also offers scholarships of various types to help its students pay for their education.

=== Supporters ===
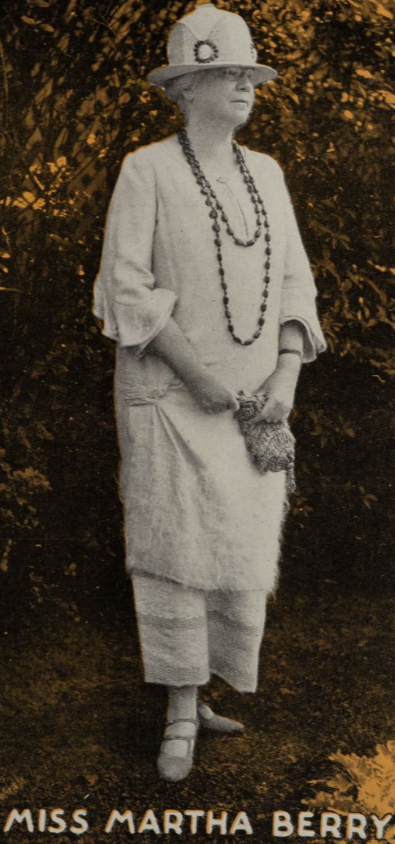
Martha Berry, c. 1925

Martha Berry had many supporters during her lifetime, such as Theodore Roosevelt, Andrew Carnegie, Ellen Louise Axson Wilson (wife of President Woodrow Wilson), and Henry Ford. Ford, in particular, was a generous benefactor to the schools and provided the funds necessary to build the castle-like dormitory complex at the college. These dormitories are named after Ford's wife and mother, Clara and Mary.

Martha Berry is the subject of several biographies: Martha Berry the Sunday Lady of Possum Trot by Tracy Byers, Miracle in the Mountains by Harnett Thomas Kane and Inez Henry Berry College, A History: The Legacy of Martha Berry by Ouida Dickey and Doyle Mathis and A Lady I Loved by Evelyn Hoge Pendley.

== Legacy ==
Educators have written that Martha Berry was responsible for the creation of work-study programs grounded in Christian faith that are found throughout the South. In recognition of Berry's contribution to education, she was inducted into the Georgia Women of Achievement in March 1992 as one of the first five inductees.

The Georgia section of U.S. Route 27 (SR 1) is dedicated as the Martha Berry Highway.

== See also ==
- Berry College
- Oak Hill & The Martha Berry Museum
