= Arp, Tennessee =

Unincorporated community in Tennessee, US

Coordinates: 35°46′24″N 89°36′09″W

Arp is an unincorporated community in Lauderdale County, Tennessee, United States. It is located along Tennessee State Route 19, approximately five miles northwest of Ripley.

== History ==
A post office called Arp was established in 1899, and remained in operation until it was discontinued in 1907. The community was likely named in honor of Bill Arp, a humorist of the late 19th century.
