= History of Unitarianism =

Unitarianism, as a Christian denominational family of churches, was first defined in Poland-Lithuania and Transylvania in the late 16th century. It was then further developed in England and America until the early 19th century, although theological ancestors are to be found as far back as the early days of Christianity. It matured and reached its classical form in the middle 19th century. Later historical development has been diverse in different countries.

== Historical antecedents ==
=== First century ===
Scholars have noted that the early first century form of Christianity sprang from Judaism. Hence they say "they [the earliest Christians] also incorporated the insistent monotheism of Judaism". Hence it is thought by many historians that the trinity doctrine "developed gradually over several centuries and through many controversies." These scholars argue that "It was the Nicene Council and even more especially the Athanasian Creed that first gave the dogma its definite formulation". One proponent of this viewpoint, scholar Jerome H. Neyrey, Ph.D. says "Jesus honors God by confessing the traditional and orthodox understanding of Israel's God" and that "He understands Israel's God in a completely traditional way."

=== Fourth century ===
Arianism was a position that God created Jesus; the presbyter Arius believed it. This view remained popular throughout much of Eastern and Western empires even after the Council of Nicea declared the idea heretical in 325 A.D. The binitarian reading of Arius' thesis was explicitly condemned as heresy at the First Council of Constantinople in 381 A.D.

=== 7th-century Islam ===
Among proponents of the revisionist school of Islamic studies positions viewing early Islam as a unitarian Christian group have found a number of academic supporters, such as Günter Lüling, who argues the original Quran was a unitarian Christian text opposed to the trinity. Along similar lines Karl-Heinz Ohlig has suggested that the person of Muhammad was not central to early Islam at all, and that early stage Islam was an Arabic Christian sect which had objections to the concept of the trinity, and that the later hadith and biographies are in large part legends, instrumental in severing Islam from its Christian roots and building a full-blown new religion. Volker Popp supports Ohlig's thesis based on archeological evidence. Édouard-Marie Gallez believes early Islam to have been a development within the unitarian anti-Nicene Judeo-Christian Nazarene sect of Christianity. A related thesis to the aforementioned ones is advanced by Fred Donner who argues that early Islam was a interfaith unitarian Believers Movement addressed to both Christians and Jews.

In the pre-modern 8th-century account of John of Damascus Islam is described as a Christian heresy led by Muhammad, whom he deems an Arian based on his (assumed) denial of the trinity.

=== The Protestant Reformation ===
In many European countries, the Protestant Reformation of the 16th century saw an outbreak, to a greater or lesser degree, of anti-Trinitarian opinion (also known as nontrinitarianism). Some doubt has been raised about the Reformers' commitment to previous beliefs, including previous Christology: John Henry Newman, who wrote, "Luther himself at one time rejected the Apocalypse, called the Epistle of St. James straminea ['straw'], condemned the word 'Trinity,' fell into a kind of Eutychianism in his view of the Holy Eucharist, and in a particular case sanctioned bigamy. Calvinism, again, in various distinct countries, has become Socinianism, and Calvin himself seems to have denied our Lord's Eternal Sonship and ridiculed the Nicene Creed. Another evidence, then, of the faithfulness of an ultimate development is its definite anticipation at an early period in the history of the idea to which it belongs."

Suppressed as a rule in individual cases, this type of doctrine ultimately became the badge of separate religious communities, in Poland, Hungary and, at a much later date, England. By contrast, Sabellianism (also known as modalism, modalistic monarchianism, or modal monarchism) is the nontrinitarian belief that the Heavenly Father, Resurrected Son, and Holy Spirit are different modes or aspects of one God, as perceived by the believer, rather than three distinct persons in God Himself.

Along with the fundamental doctrine, certain characteristics have always marked those who profess unitarianism: a large degree of tolerance, a historical study of scripture, a minimizing of essentials, and a repugnance to formulated creed.

Martin Cellarius (1499–1564), a friend of Luther, and Hans Denck (1500–1527) usually are considered the first literary pioneers of the movement; the anti-Trinitarian position of Ludwig Haetzer did not become public until after his execution (1529) for Anabaptism. Luther himself was opposed to the Unitarian movement, and viewed the founder of Islam, Muhammad, as an adherent to the teachings of Arius.

Michael Servetus (1511?–1553) stimulated thought in this direction and heavily influenced other reformers both by his writings and by his death at the stake. In 1531, he had published his theological treatise De Trinitatis Erroribus (On the Errors About the Trinity), in which he rejected the Nicene dogma of the Trinity and proposed that the Son was the union of the divine Logos with the man Jesus, miraculously born from the Virgin Mary through the intervention of God's spirit. This was generally interpreted as a denial of the Trinitarian dogma. (Actually, Servetus had described the Trinity as a "three-headed Cerberus" and "three ghosts", which only led believers to confusion and error.) Servetus expanded his ideas on the nature of God and Christ 20 years later in his major work, Christianismi Restitutio (The Restoration of Christianity), which caused his burning at the stake in Calvin's Geneva (as well as in effigy by the Catholic Inquisition in France) in 1553 . Nowadays, most Unitarians see Servetus as their pioneer and first martyr, and his thought was a remarkable influence in the beginnings of Polish and Transylvanian anti-Trinitarian churches, even though his Arian views on Jesus Christ (for example, retaining belief in the pre-existence of Christ) were different from those of the Polish Socinians (rejecting belief in Jesus' pre-existence), and again from the generation of Thomas Belsham (rejecting also the virgin birth), and very different from what the Unitarian Church generally believes today.

The Anabaptist Council of Venice 1550 marks the start of a formal but underground anti-Trinitarian movement in Italy, led by men such as Matteo Gribaldi. The Italian exiles spread anti-Trinitarian views to Switzerland, Germany, Poland, Transylvania, and Holland.

The Dialogues (1563) of Bernardino Ochino, while defending the Trinity, stated objections and difficulties with a force that captivated many. In his 27th Dialogue, Ochino points to Hungary as a possible home of religious liberty. And in Poland and Hungary definitely anti-Trinitarian religious communities first formed and were tolerated.

== Classical period of Unitarianism ==
=== Poland ===
Scattered expressions of anti-Trinitarian opinion appeared in Poland early. At the age of 80, Catherine, wife of Melchior Vogel or Weygel, was burned at Cracow (1539) for apostasy; whether her views embraced more than deism is not clear. The first synod of the (Calvinist) Reformed Church took place in 1555; the second Synod (1556) faced the theological challenges of Grzegorz Paweł z Brzezin (Gregory Pauli) and Peter Gonesius (Piotr z Goniądza), who were aware of the works of Servetus and of Italian anti-Trinitarians such as Matteo Gribaldi. The arrival of Giorgio Biandrata in 1558 furnished the party with a temporary leader.

The term "Unitarian" first appeared as unitaria religio in a document of the Diet of Lécfalva, Transylvania on 25 October 1600, though it was not widely used in Transylvania until 1638, when the formal recepta Unitaria Religio was published. The Polish Brethren began as a grouping of Arians and Unitarians who split from the Polish Calvinist Church in 1565, though by 1580 the Unitarian views of Fausto Sozzini (hence the adjective Socinian) had become the majority. Sozzini's grandson Andrzej Wiszowaty Sr. in 1665-1668 published Bibliotheca Fratrum Polonorum quos Unitarios vocant (Library of the Polish Brethren who are called Unitarians 4 vols. 1665–69). The name was introduced into English by the Socinian Henry Hedworth in 1673. Afterwards, the term was commonly used in English, though their detractors continued to label both Arian and Unitarian views as "Socinian".

In 1565, the Diet (Sejm) of Piotrków excluded anti-Trinitarians from the existing synod of the Polish Reformed Church (henceforth the Ecclesia maior), and Unitarians began to hold their own synods as the Ecclesia minor. Known by various other names (of which Polish brethren and Arian were the most common), at no time in its history did this body adopt for itself any designation other than "Christian". Originally Arian (but excluding any worship of Christ) and Anabaptist, the Minor Church was (by 1588) brought round to the views of Fausto Sozzini, who had settled in Poland in 1579 and who denied the pre-existence of Christ, while accepting the virgin birth (see Socinianism).

In 1602, the nobleman Jakub Sienieński established among the anti-Trinitarian community founded by his father at Raków, Kielce County the Racovian Academy and a printing-press, from which the Racovian Catechism was issued in 1605. In 1610, a Catholic reaction led by Jesuits began. The establishment at Raków was suppressed in 1638, after two boys allegedly pelted a crucifix outside the town.

For 20 years (1639–1659), the Arians were tolerated, but public opinion widely considered them as collaborators with Sweden during The Deluge, and in 1660 the Polish Diet gave anti-Trinitarians the option of conformity or exile. The Ecclesia minor or Minor Church included many Polish magnates, but their adoption of the views of Sozzini, which precluded Christians from magisterial office, rendered them politically powerless.

The execution of the decree, hastened by a year, took place in 1660. While some conformed, a large number made their way to the Netherlands, where the Remonstrants admitted them to membership on the basis of the Apostles' Creed. Others, like Christopher Crell, went to the German frontier, Prussia, and Lithuania. A contingent settled in Transylvania, not joining the Unitarian Church, but maintaining a distinct organization at Kolozsvár until 1793.

The refugees who reached Amsterdam published the Bibliotheca fratrum polonorum (1665–1669), with the assistance of the Prussian emigre Christopher Sandius, embracing the works of Johannes Crellius (their leading theologian), Jonasz Szlichtyng (their chief Biblical commentator), Fausto Sozzini, and Johann Ludwig von Wolzogen. The title page of this collection, bearing the words quos Unitarios vocant, introduced the term Unitarian to Western Europe.

The term Unitarian (in Latin) was first used by Polish and Dutch Socinians from the 1660s.

=== Transylvania and Hungary ===
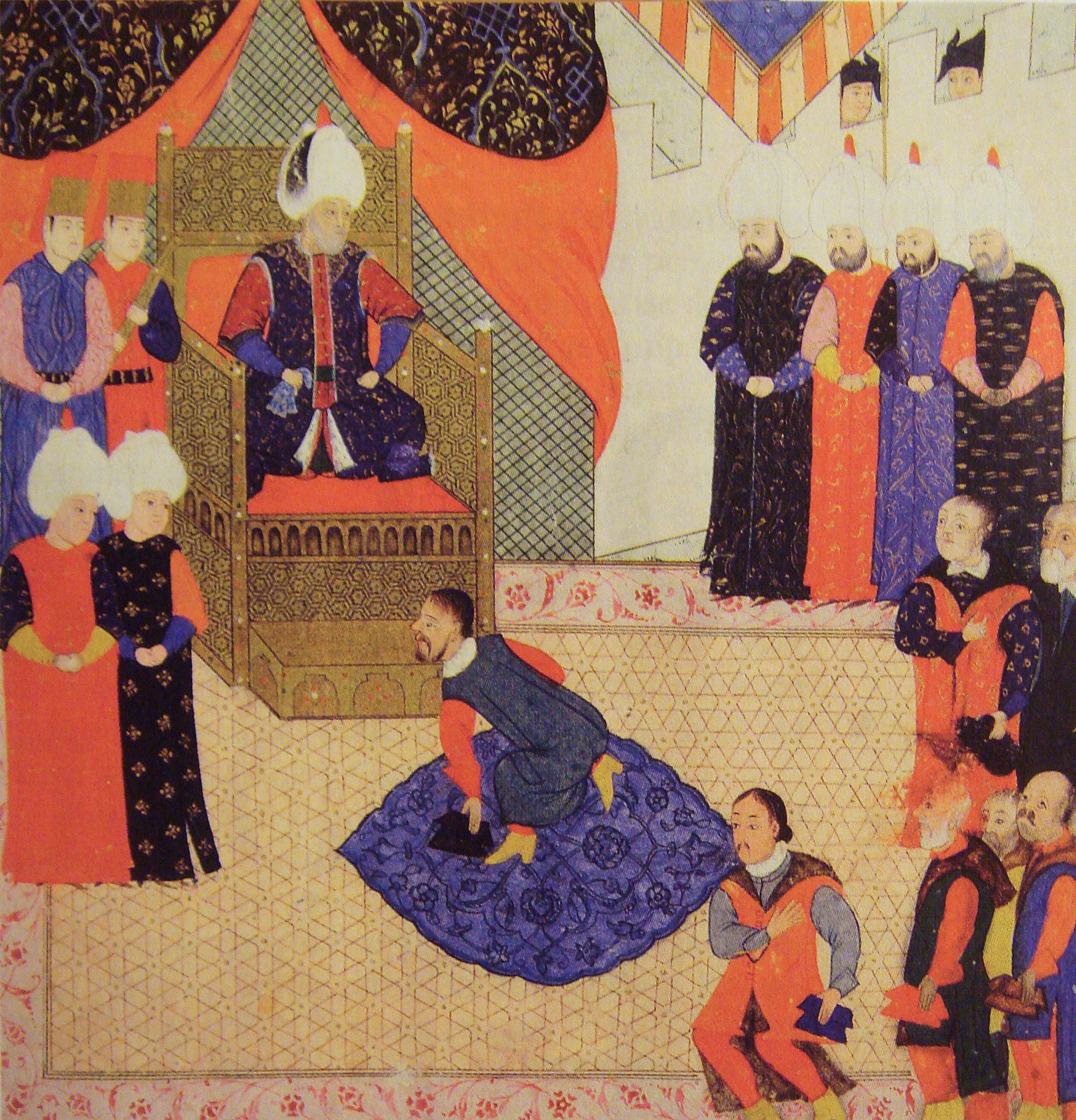
King John Sigismund of Hungary with Suleiman the Magnificent in 1556.

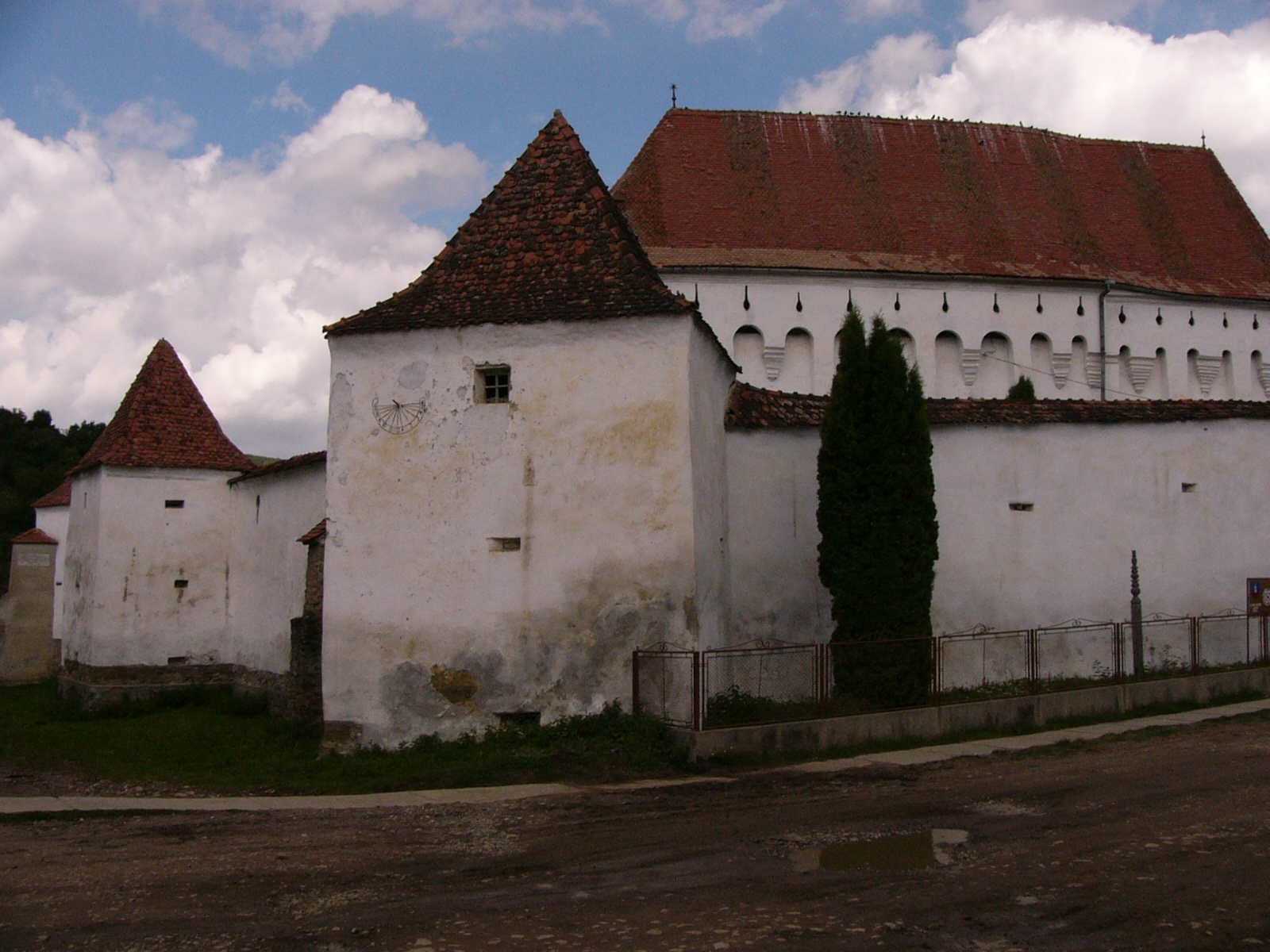
The Unitarian Church in Dârjiu, Romania

No distinct trace of anti-Trinitarian opinion precedes the appearance of Giorgio Biandrata at the Transylvanian court in 1563. His influence was exerted on Ferenc Dávid (1510–1579), who was successively Roman Catholic, Lutheran, Calvinist, and finally anti-Trinitarian. Some argue that the growth of anti-Trinitarian opinion in Transylvania and Hungary may have partly been due to the growing Islamic influence of the expanding Ottoman Empire at the time.

In 1564, Dávid was elected by the Calvinists as "bishop of the Hungarian churches in Transylvania", and appointed court preacher to John Sigismund, prince of Transylvania. His discussion of the Trinity began (1565) with doubts of the personality of the Holy Ghost.

His antagonist in public disputes was the Calvinist leader, Peter Melius (Bishop of Debrecen 1558–1572); his supporter was Biandrata. John Sigismund, adopting his court-preacher's views, issued (1568) an edict of religious liberty at the Diet of Torda, which allowed Dávid (retaining his existing title) to transfer his episcopate from the Calvinists to the anti-Trinitarians, Kolozsvár being evacuated by all but his followers.

In 1571, John Sigismund was succeeded by Stephen Báthory, a Catholic. Under the influence of Johann Sommer, rector of the Kolozsvár gymnasium, David (about 1572) abandoned the worship of Christ. The attempted accommodation by Fausto Sozzini only precipitated matters. Tried as an innovator, Dávid died in prison at the Fortress of Déva (1579). The cultus of Christ became an established usage of the Church; it is recognized in the 1837 edition of the official hymnal, but removed in later editions.

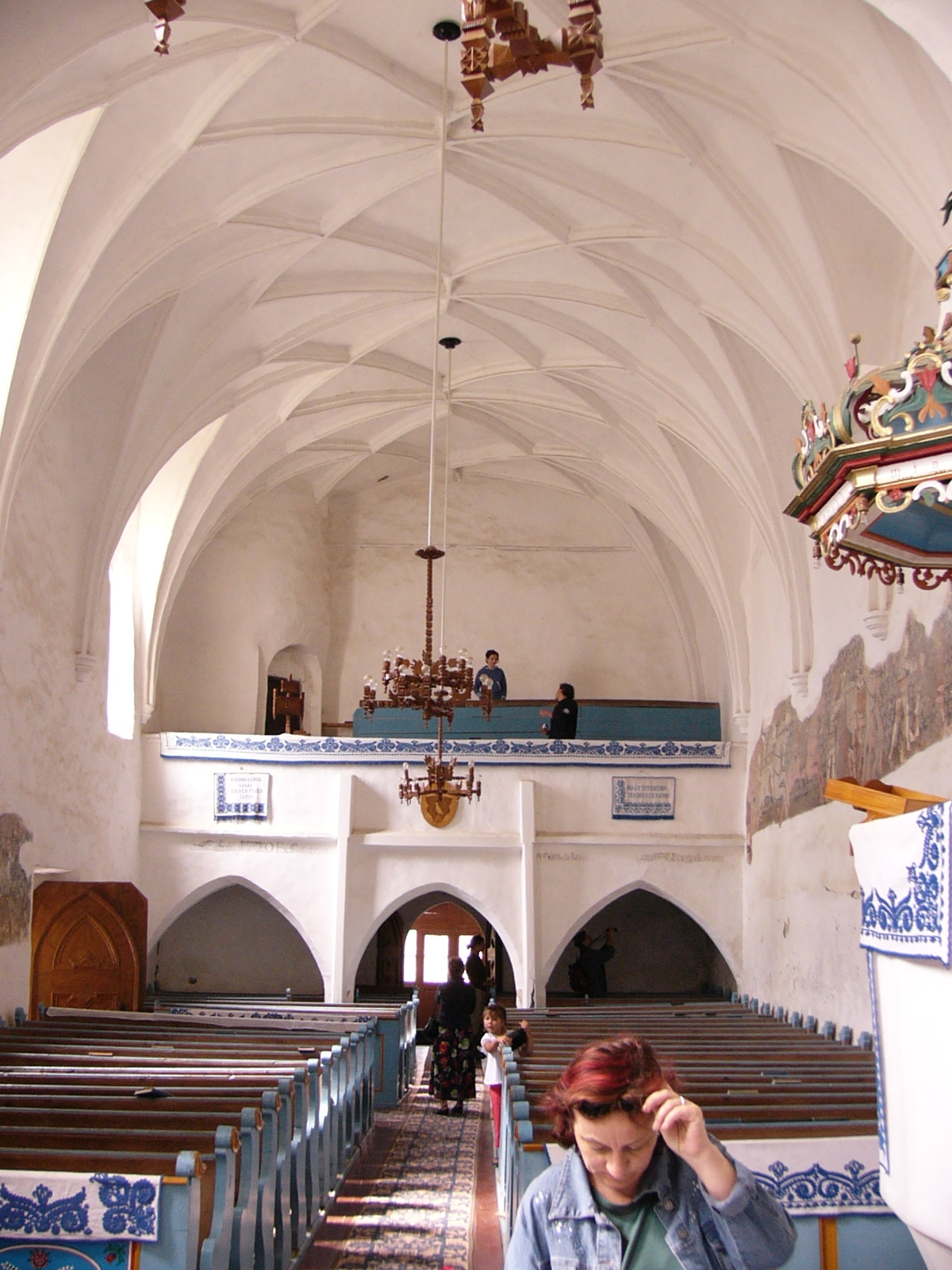
Interior of the Gothic church in Dârjiu

The term unitarius made its first documented appearance, unitaria religio, in a decree of the Diet of Lécfalva (1600); though, it was not officially adopted by the Church until 1638.

In 1618, the Unitarian Church condemned and withdrew from Simon Péchi and the Sabbatarians, a group with Judaic tendencies. The group continued to exist till the 1840s by which time many had converted to Judaism. In 1626 the Disciplina ecclesiastica was published by Bishop Bálint Radeczki (Latin: Valentinus Radecius, bishop 1616–1632). 1638 saw the Accord of Dés and suppression of the Unitarians.

Of the line of twenty-three bishops, the most distinguished were George Enyedi (1592–1597), whose Explicationes obtained European vogue, and Mihály Lombard de Szentábrahám (1737–1758), who rallied the forces of his Church, broken by persecution and deprivation of property, and gave them their traditional statement of faith. His Summa Universae Theologiae Christianae secundum Unitarios (published 1787), Socinian with Arminian modifications, was accepted by Joseph II as the official manifesto of doctrine, and so remains, though subscription to it has not been required since the 19th century.

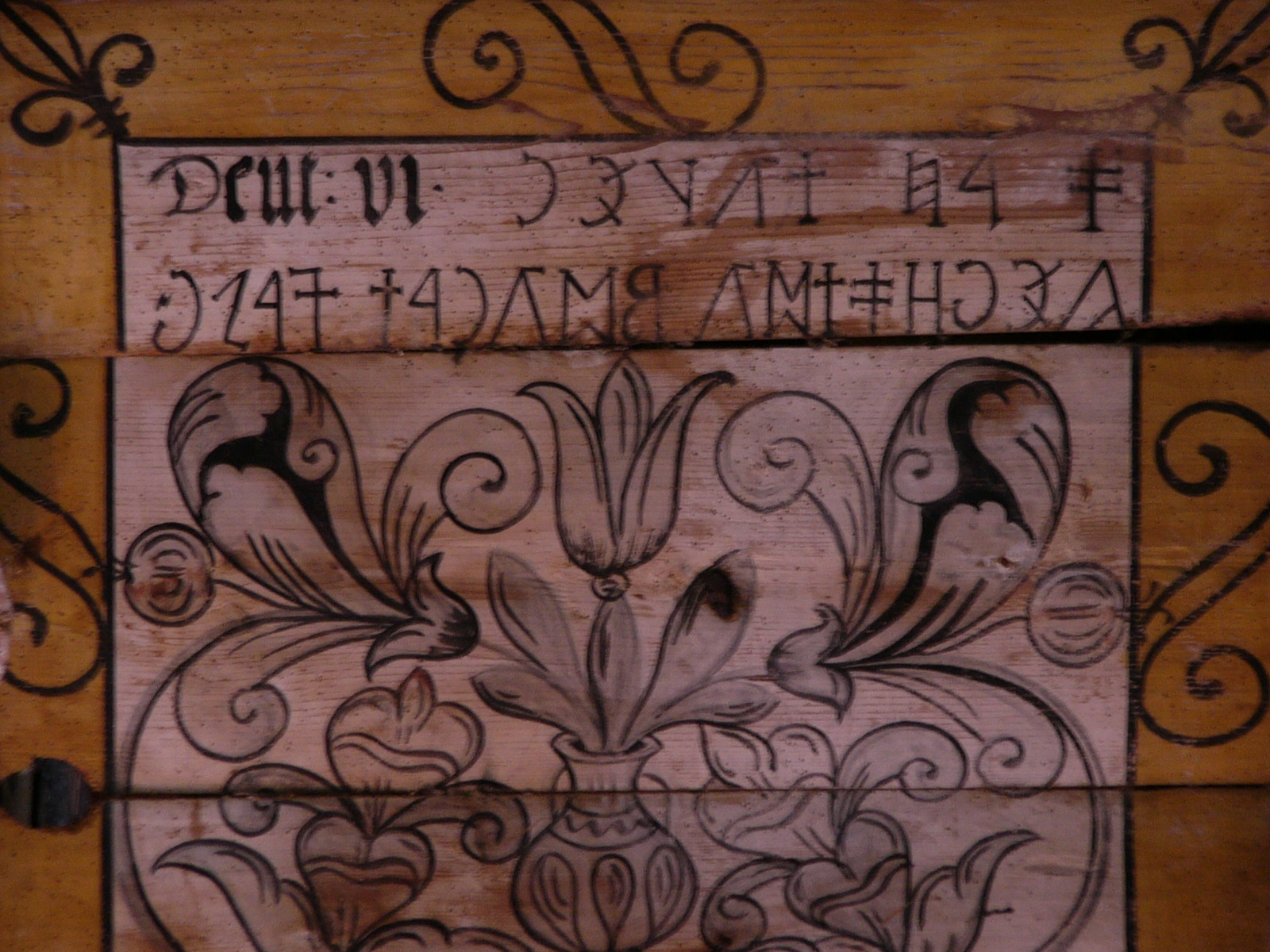
The Inlăceni Hungarian Runes. Inscription (1668) reads "Egy az Isten Georgyius Musnai diakon", or "God is One Georgius Musnai deacon."

The first secondary school in Transylvania was established in the late 18th century in Székelykeresztúr (Cristuru Secuiesc); this functions to this day, although as a state school.

The official title in Hungary is the Hungarian Unitarian Church, with a membership of about 25,000 members. In Romania, there is a separate church with the name of Unitarian Church of Transylvania and about 65,000 members, especially among the Székely population. In the past, the Unitarian bishop had a seat in the Hungarian parliament. The principal college of both churches is located at Cluj-Napoca (Kolozsvár), which is also the seat of the Transylvanian consistory; there were others at Turda (Torda) and at Cristuru Secuiesc.

Until 1818, the continued existence of this body was largely unknown to English Unitarians. Relations subsequently became intimate. After 1860, a succession of students finished their theological education at Manchester College, Oxford; others at the Unitarian Home Missionary College.

=== England ===
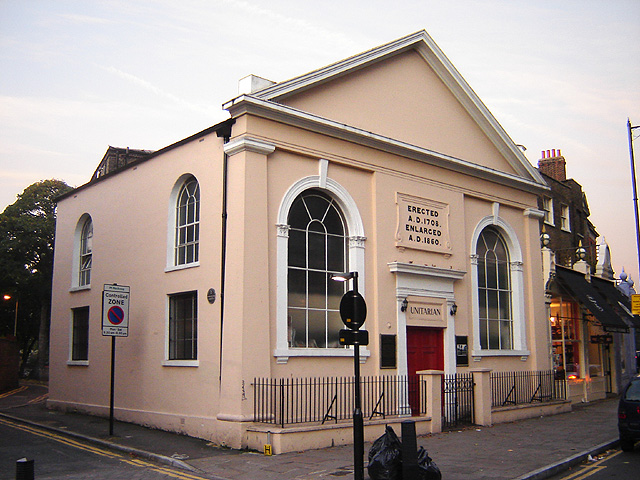
Newington Green Unitarian Church, London, England. Built in 1708, this is the oldest non-conformist church in London still in use as a church. (October 2005)

In England, Unitarianism was a Protestant sect with roots in the Anabaptist radicals of the English Civil War. They adopted adult baptism and Godly republicanism, and they were egalitarians who sought to promote extreme revolutionary ideals. The movement gained popularity among dissenting nonconformists in the early 18th century. English Presbyterians were attracted to the second city at Norwich, by its emerging scientific community, which in the wake of the Enlightenment was particularly strong in Scotland. They began to become a formal denomination in 1774 when Theophilus Lindsey organized meetings with Joseph Priestley, founding the first avowedly Unitarian congregation in the country, at Essex Street Church in London. In 1791, Lindsey and his colleague John Disney were behind the "first organized denominational Unitarian society", formally The Unitarian Society for promoting Christian Knowledge and the Practice of Virtue by the Distribution of Books but more simply known as the Unitarian Book Society. This was followed by The Unitarian Fund (1806), which sent out missionaries and financially supported poorer congregations. Unitarianism was not fully legal in the United Kingdom until the Doctrine of the Trinity Act 1813, a bill largely pushed forward in Parliament by William Smith, and thus known sometimes under his name or as the Unitarian Relief Act (Trinity Act) or as The Unitarian Toleration Bill. This did not grant them full civil rights while the oppressive Corporation Act and Test Act remained, and thus in 1819 the third significant Unitarian society was created, The Association for the Protection of the Civil Rights of Unitarians. In 1825, these three groups combined into the British and Foreign Unitarian Association. A century later, this joined with the Sunday School Association to become the General Assembly of Unitarian and Free Christian Churches, which remains today the umbrella organisation for British Unitarianism.

==== Early beginnings ====
Between 1548 (John Assheton) and 1612, we find few anti-Trinitarians, most of whom were either executed or forced to recant. Those burned included the Flemish surgeon George van Parris (1551); Patrick Pakingham (1555), a fellmonger; Matthew Hamont (1579), a ploughwright; John Lewes (1583); Peter Cole (1587), a tanner; Francis Kett (1589), physician and author; Bartholomew Legate (1612), a cloth-dealer and last of the Smithfield victims; and the twice-burned Edward Wightman (1612). In all these, cases the anti-Trinitarian sentiments seem to have come from Holland. The last two executions followed the dedication to James I of the Latin version of the Racovian Catechism (1609).

==== Socinian influence ====
Fausto Sozzini had died on the road, after expulsion from Kraków, Poland on 4 March 1604, but the Racovian Academy and printing press continued till 1639, exerting influence in England via the Netherlands.

The popularity of Socinian views, typified by men such as Lucius Cary, 2nd Viscount Falkland and Chillingworth, led to the abortive fourth canon of 1640 against Socinian books. The ordinance of 1648 made denial of the Trinity a capital offence, but it remained a dead letter, Cromwell intervening in the cases of Paul Best (1590–1657) and John Biddle (1616–1662).

In 1652–1654 and 1658–1662, Biddle held a Socinian conventicle in London. In addition to his own writings, he reprinted (1651) and translated (1652) the Racovian Catechism, and the Life of Socinus (1653). His disciple Thomas Firmin (1632–1697), mercer and philanthropist, and friend of John Tillotson, adopted the more Sabellian views of Stephen Nye (1648–1719), a clergyman. Firmin promoted a remarkable series of controversial tracts (1690–1699).

In England, the Socinian controversy initiated by Biddle preceded the Arian controversy initiated by Samuel Clarke's Scripture Doctrine of the Trinity (1712), although John Knowles was an Arian lay preacher at Chester in 1650. Arian or semi-Arian views had great popularity during the 18th century, both in the Church and among dissenters.

==== "Unitarian" 1673 ====
The word Unitarian had been circulating in private letters in England, in reference to imported copies of such publications as the Library of the Polish Brethren who are called Unitarians (1665); Henry Hedworth was the first to use the word "Unitarian" in print in English (1673), and the word first appears in a title in Stephen Nye's A brief history of the Unitarians, called also Socinians (1687). It was construed in a broad sense to cover all who, with whatever differences, held to the unipersonality of the Divine Being. Firmin later had a project of Unitarian societies "within the Church".

==== Act of Toleration 1689 ====
The first preacher to describe himself as Unitarian was Thomas Emlyn (1663–1741), who gathered a London congregation in 1705. This was contrary to the Act of Toleration 1689, which excluded all who should preach or write against the Trinity.

In 1689, Presbyterians and Independents had coalesced, agreeing to drop both names and to support a common fund. The union in the London fund was ruptured in 1693. Over time, differences in the administration of the two funds led to the attaching of the Presbyterian name to theological liberals, though many of the older Unitarian chapels were Independent foundations, and at least half of the Presbyterian chapels (of 1690–1710) came into the hands of Congregationalists.

==== Salters' Hall conference 1719 ====
The free atmosphere of dissenting academies (colleges) favoured new ideas. The effect of the Salters' Hall conference (1719), called for by the views of James Peirce (1673–1726) of Exeter, was to leave dissenting congregations to determine their own orthodoxy. The General Baptists had already (1700) condoned defections from the common doctrine. Leaders in the advocacy of a purely humanitarian christology came largely from the Independents, such as Nathaniel Lardner (1684–1768), Caleb Fleming (1698–1779), Joseph Priestley (1733–1804), and Thomas Belsham (1750–1829).

Isaac Newton was an anti-Trinitarian, and generally identified as an Arian. One of his last visitors before his death in 1727 was Samuel Crellius from Lithuania.

==== The Unitarian Church 1774 ====
The formation of a distinct Unitarian denomination dates from the secession (1773) of Theophilus Lindsey (1723–1808) from the Anglican Church, on the failure of the Feathers petition to parliament (1772) for relief from subscription. Lindsey's secession had been preceded in Ireland by that of William Robertson D.D. (1705–1783), who has been called "the father of Unitarian nonconformity". It was followed by other clerical secessions, mostly of men who left the ministry, and Lindsey's hope of a Unitarian movement from the Anglican Church was disappointed. The congregation he established at Essex Street Chapel, with the assistance of prominent ministers such as Joseph Priestley and Richard Price, was a pivot for change. Legal difficulties with the authorities were overcome with the help of barrister John Lee, who later became Attorney-General. By degrees, Lindsey's type of theology superseded Arianism in a considerable number of dissenting congregations.

The Act of Toleration 1689 was amended (1779) by substituting belief in Scripture for belief in the Anglican (doctrinal) articles. In 1813, the penal acts against deniers of the Trinity were repealed by the Doctrine of the Trinity Act 1813, largely pushed through Parliament by William Smith, M.P., abolitionist, and grandfather of Florence Nightingale. In 1825 the British and Foreign Unitarian Association was formed as a combination of three older societies for literature (1791), mission work (1806), and civil rights (1818).

Attacks were made on properties held by Unitarians, but created before 1813. The Wolverhampton Chapel case began in 1817, the more important Hewley Fund case in 1830; both were decided against the Unitarians in 1842. Appeal to parliament resulted in the Dissenters' Chapels Act (1844), which secured that, so far as trusts did not specify doctrines, twenty-five years tenure legitimated existing usage.

==== The waning of the miraculous ====
In the 1700s, the leading Unitarian theologian, Joseph Priestley (who was also the scientist credited with the discovery of oxygen), believed that God performed many miracles. Priestly said that “it appears to me that no facts, in the whole compass of history, are so well authenticated as those of the miracles, the death, and the resurrection of Christ, and also what is related of the apostles in the book of Acts” and that the “christian faith implies a belief of all the great historical facts recorded in the Old and New Testament.”

But the period 1800–1850 is characterized by a shift in the British Unitarian movement's position from questioning the doctrine of the Trinity or the pre-existence of Christ to questioning the miraculous, biblical inspiration, and the virgin birth, though not yet at this point questioning the resurrection of Christ.

==== Influence from America ====
During the 19th century, the drier Priestley-Belsham type of Unitarianism, bound up with a determinist philosophy, was gradually modified by the influence of Channing (see below), whose works were reprinted in numerous editions and owed a wide circulation to the efforts of Robert Spears (1825–1899). Another American influence, potent in reducing the rigid though limited supernaturalism of Belsham and his successors, was that of Theodore Parker (1810–1860). At home, the teaching of James Martineau (1805–1900), resisted at first, was at length powerfully felt, seconded as it was by the influence of John James Tayler (1797–1869) and of John Hamilton Thom (1808–1894).

==== Notable people and institutions ====
English Unitarianism produced some well-known scholars, e.g. John Kenrick (1788–1877), James Yates (1789–1871), Samuel Sharpe (1799–1881), but few popular preachers, though George Harris (1794–1859) is an exception. For the education of its ministry it supported Manchester College at Oxford (which deduced its ancestry from the academy of Richard Frankland, begun 1670), the Unitarian Home Missionary College (founded in Manchester in 1854 by John Relly Beard, D.D., and William Gaskell), and the Presbyterian College, Carmarthen. It also produced the notable Chamberlain family of politicians: Joseph Chamberlain, Austen Chamberlain, and Neville Chamberlain, and the Courtauld and Tate industrialist dynasties.

==== Notable publications ====
English Unitarian periodical literature begins with Priestley's Theological Repository (1769–1788) and includes the Monthly Repository (1806–1838), The Christian Reformer (1834–1863), The Christian Teacher (1835–1844), The Prospective Review (1845–1854), The National Review (1855–1864), The Theological Review (1864–1879), and The Hibbert Journal, one of the enterprises of the Hibbert Trust, founded by Robert Hibbert (1770–1849) and originally designated the Anti-Trinitarian Fund. This came into operation in 1853, awarded scholarships and fellowships, supported an annual lectureship (1878–1894), and maintained (from 1894) a chair of ecclesiastical history at Manchester College.

=== Scotland ===
Much has been made of the execution (1697) at Edinburgh of the student Thomas Aikenhead, convicted of blaspheming the Trinity. The works of John Taylor, D.D. (1694–1761) on original sin and atonement had much influence in the east of Scotland, as we learn from Robert Burns. Such men as William Dalrymple, D.D. (1723–1814) and William M'Gill, D.D. (1732–1807), along with other "moderates", were under suspicion of similar heresies. Overt Unitarianism has never had much popularity in Scotland. The only congregation of old foundation is at Edinburgh, founded in 1776 by a secession from one of the "fellowship societies" formed by James Fraser, of Brea (1639–1699). The mission enterprises of Richard Wright (1764–1836) and George Harris (1794–1859) produced results of no great permanence.

The Scottish Unitarian Association was founded in 1813, mainly by Thomas Southwood Smith, M.D., the sanitary reformer. The McQuaker Trust was founded (1889) for propagandist purposes.

Paradoxically, one of the reasons for the relative weakness of Unitarian movement in Scotland in the early 19th century may be the continuing presence of conservative, and therefore Bible-fundamentalist, anti-Trinitarian, Arian, and Socinian views in dissenting chapels and among the Scottish followers of the Restoration Movement and Millerite movement. The anti-Trinitarian believers in Scotland were often more sympathetic to the Unitarians of a century earlier than to the more liberal views of Wright, Harris, and Southwood Smith. A notable Bible-fundamentalist Scottish Unitarian was J. S. Hyndman, author of Lectures on The Principles of Unitarianism (Alnwick, 1824) This conservative anti-Trinitarian presence can be demonstrated by the response in Scotland, relative both to America and to his home town London, of the call of the first Christadelphian John Thomas. The first congregations following Thomas' Socinian and Adventist teachings in 1848-1849 were predominantly Scottish. And while the Christadelphians initially made more of their Millennialist teachings, the christological legacy of 17th century unitarians such as John Biddle is evident and acknowledged.

Currently, there are four Unitarian churches in Scotland: Aberdeen, Dundee, Edinburgh and Glasgow.

=== Ireland ===
Controversy respecting the Trinity was excited in Ireland by the prosecution at Dublin (1703) of Thomas Emlyn (see above) resulting in fine and imprisonment for rejecting the deity of Christ. In 1705, the Belfast Society was founded for theological discussion by Presbyterian ministers in the north, resulting in a body of opinion adverse to subscription to the Westminster standards. Toleration of dissent, withheld in Ireland till 1719, was then granted without the requirement of any doctrinal subscription. The next year, a movement against subscription began in the General Synod of Ulster, culminating (1725) in the placing of the advocates of non-subscription, headed by John Abernethy, D.D., of Antrim into a presbytery by themselves. This Presbytery of Antrim was excluded (1726) from jurisdiction, though not from communion. During the next hundred years, its members exercised great influence on their brethren of the synod. But the counter-influence of the mission of the Scottish Seceders (from 1742) produced a reaction. The Antrim Presbytery gradually became Arian; the same type of theology affected more or less the Southern Association, known since 1806 as the Synod of Munster. From 1783, ten of the fourteen presbyteries in the Synod of Ulster had made subscription optional; the synod's code of 1824 left "soundness in the faith" to be ascertained by subscription or by examination. Against this compromise, Henry Cooke, D.D. (1788–1868) directed all his powers and was ultimately (1829) successful in defeating his Arian opponent, Henry Montgomery, LL.D. (1788–1865). Montgomery led a secession that formed (1830) the Remonstrant Synod of Ulster, comprising three presbyteries.

In 1910, the Antrim Presbytery, Remonstrant Synod and Synod of Munster united as the General Synod of the Non-subscribing Presbyterian Church of Ireland, with 38 congregations and some mission stations. Till 1889, they maintained two theological chairs in Belfast, where John Scott Porter (1801–1880) pioneered biblical criticism. Afterwards, they sent their students to England for theological education, though in certain respects their views and practices remained more conservative than those of their English brethren. Irish Unitarian periodical literature began in 1832 with the Bible Christian, followed by the Irish Unitarian Magazine, the Christian Unitarian, the Disciple, and the Non-subscribing Presbyterian.

=== United States ===
The history of Unitarian thought in the United States can be roughly divided into four periods:

- a period of precursor movements (early 18th century to c. 1800)
- the formative period (c. 1800–1835)
- a Transcendentalist period (c. 1835–1885)
- the modern period (since 1885)

==== Precursor movements and early Unitarianism ====
Unitarianism in the United States followed essentially the same development as in England, passing through the stages of Arminianism, Arianism, rationalism, and then a modernism based on an acceptance of the results of the comparative study of all religions. In the early 18th century Arminianism presented itself in New England, and sporadically elsewhere. This tendency was largely accelerated by a backlash against the "Great Awakening" under Jonathan Edwards and George Whitefield. Before the War of Independence Arianism showed itself in individual instances, and French influences were widespread in the direction of deism, though they were not organized into any definite utterance by religious bodies.

As early as the middle of the 18th century, Harvard College represented some of the most advanced thought of the time, and a score or more of clergymen in New England preached what was essentially Unitarianism. The most prominent of these men was Jonathan Mayhew (1720–1766), pastor of the West Church in Boston, Massachusetts, from 1747 to 1766. He preached the strict unity of God, the subordinate nature of Christ, and salvation by character. Charles Chauncy (1705–1787), pastor of the First Church from 1727 until his death, the chief opponent of Edwards in the great revival, was both a Unitarian and a Universalist. Other Unitarians included Ebenezer Gay (1698–1787) of Hingham, Samuel West (1730–1807) of New Bedford, Thomas Barnard (1748–1814) of Salem, Massachusetts, John Prince (1751–1836) and William Bentley (1758–1819) of Salem, Aaron Bancroft (1755–1836) of Worcester, and several others.

The first official acceptance of the Unitarian faith on the part of a congregation was by King's Chapel in Boston, which settled James Freeman (1759–1835) in 1782, and revised the Prayer Book into a mild Unitarian liturgy in 1785. The Rev. William Hazlitt (father of the essayist and critic), visiting the United States in 1783–1785, published the fact that there were Unitarians in Philadelphia, Boston, Charleston, South Carolina, Pittsburgh, Hallowell, Maine, on Cape Cod, and elsewhere. Unitarian congregations were organized at Portland and Saco, Maine in 1792 by Thomas Oxnard; in 1800 the First Church in Plymouth—the congregation founded by the Pilgrims in 1620—accepted the more liberal faith. Joseph Priestley emigrated to the United States in 1794 and organized a Unitarian Church at Northumberland, Pennsylvania that same year and one at Philadelphia in 1796. His writings had a considerable influence.

Thus, from 1725 to 1825, Unitarianism was gaining ground in New England, and to some extent elsewhere. The first distinctive manifestation of the change was the inauguration of Henry Ware (1764–1845) as professor of divinity at Harvard College, in 1805.

Unitarian books appeared by John Sherman (1772–1828) that same year and in 1810 by Noah Worcester (1758–1837). At the opening of the 19th century, with one exception, all the churches of Boston were occupied by Unitarian preachers, and various periodicals and organizations expressed Unitarian opinions. Churches were established in New York City, Baltimore, Washington, Charleston, and elsewhere during this period.

==== Formative period ====
The next period of American Unitarianism, from about 1800 to about 1835, can be thought of as formative, mainly influenced by English philosophy, semi-supernatural, imperfectly rationalistic, devoted to philanthropy and practical Christianity. Dr. Channing was its distinguished exponent.

The first official acceptance of the Unitarian faith on the part of a congregation in America was by King's Chapel in Boston, which took James Freeman (1759–1853) as its pastor in 1782, and revised the Prayer Book into a mild Unitarian liturgy in 1785. In 1800, Joseph Stevens Buckminster became minister of the Brattle Street Church in Boston, where his brilliant sermons, literary activities, and academic attention to the German "New Criticism" helped shape the subsequent growth of Unitarianism in New England. Unitarian Henry Ware (1764–1845) was appointed as the Hollis Professor of Divinity at Harvard College, in 1805. Harvard Divinity School then shifted from its conservative roots to teach, instead, Unitarian theology. Buckminster's close associate William Ellery Channing (1780–1842) became pastor of the Federal Street Church in Boston, 1803; in a few years he became the leader of the Unitarian movement. At first mystical rather than rationalistic in his theology, he took part with the "Catholic Christians", as they called themselves, who aimed at bringing Christianity into harmony with the progressive spirit of the time. His essays on The System of Exclusion and Denunciation in Religion (1815) and Objections to Unitarian Christianity Considered (1819) made him a defender of Unitarianism. His sermon on "Unitarian Christianity", preached at First Unitarian Church of Baltimore in 1819, at the ordination of Jared Sparks, and that at New York in 1821, made him its interpreter.

The result of the "Unitarian Controversy" (1815) was a growing division in the Congregational churches, which was emphasized in 1825 by the formation of the American Unitarian Association at Boston. It was organized "to diffuse the knowledge and promote the interests of pure Christianity" and it published tracts and books, supported poor churches, sent out missionaries into every part of the country, and established new churches in nearly all the states. Essentially non-sectarian, with little missionary zeal, the Unitarian movement has grown slowly, and its influence had chiefly operated through general culture and the literature of the country. Many of its clergymen had been trained in other denominations, but the Harvard Divinity School was distinctly Unitarian from its formation, in 1816, until 1870, when it became a non-sectarian department of the university. The Meadville Lombard Theological School was founded at Meadville, Pennsylvania, in 1844, and the Starr King School for the Ministry at Berkeley, California, in 1904.

The Story of Essex Hall, written in 1959 by Mortimer Rowe, the Secretary (i.e. chief executive) of the General Assembly of Unitarian and Free Christian Churches for its first twenty years, claims that the BFUA and AUA were founded entirely coincidentally on the same day, 26 May 1825.

The first school founded by the Unitarians was the Clinton Liberal Institute, in Clinton, Oneida County, New York, in 1831.

==== Influence of Transcendentalism; reaction ====
A third period (see Transcendentalism), from about 1835 to about 1885 and profoundly influenced by German idealism, was increasingly rationalistic, though its theology was largely flavoured by mysticism. As a reaction against this, the National Unitarian Conference was organized in 1865 and adopted a distinctly Christian platform, affirming that its members were "disciples of the Lord Jesus Christ".

The more rationalistic minority thereupon formed the Free Religious Association, "to encourage the scientific study of theology and to increase fellowship in the spirit." The Western Unitarian Conference later accepted the same position and based its "fellowship on no dogmatic tests", instead affirming a desire "to establish truth, righteousness and love in the world." In addition, the Western Unitarian Conference claimed that belief in God was not a necessary component of Unitarian belief.

This period of controversy and of vigorous theological development nearly came to an end soon after 1885. Its cessation was assured by the action of the national conference at Saratoga Springs, New York, in 1894, when it was affirmed by an almost unanimous vote that: "These churches accept the religion of Jesus, holding, in accordance with his teaching, that practical religion is summed up in love to God and love to man. The conference recognizes the fact that its constituency is Congregational in tradition and polity. Therefore it declares that nothing in this constitution is to be construed as an authoritative test; and we cordially invite to our working fellowship any who, while differing from us in belief, are in general sympathy with our spirit and our practical aims." The leaders of this period were Ralph Waldo Emerson with his idealism and Theodore Parker with his acceptance of Christianity as absolute religion.

==== Modern period ====
The fourth period, beginning about 1885, has been one of rationalism, recognition of universal religion, large acceptance of the scientific method and ideas, and an ethical attempt to realize what was perceived as the higher affirmations of Christianity. It has been marked by a general harmony and unity, by steady growth in the number of churches, and by a widening fellowship with all other similarly minded movements.

This phase was shown in the organization of The International Council of Unitarian and other Liberal Religious Thinkers and Workers at Boston on 25 May 1900, "to open communication with those in all lands who are striving to unite pure religion and perfect liberty, and to increase fellowship and co-operation among them." This council has held biennial sessions in London, Amsterdam, Geneva, and Boston. During the period after 1885, the influence of Emerson became predominant, modified by the more scientific preaching of Minot Judson Savage, who found his guides in Darwin and Spencer.

Beyond its own borders, the body obtained recognition through the public work of such men as Henry Whitney Bellows and Edward Everett Hale, the remarkable influence of James Freeman Clarke and Thomas Lamb Eliot, and the popular power of Robert Collyer. The number of Unitarian churches in the United States in 1909 was 461, with 541 ministers. The church membership then may be estimated at 100,000. The periodicals were The Christian Register, weekly, Boston; Unity, weekly, Chicago; The Unitarian, monthly, New York; Old and New, monthly, Des Moines; Pacific Unitarian, San Francisco.

In 1961, the American Unitarian Association merged with the Universalist Church of America, forming the Unitarian Universalist Association (UUA).

Strictly speaking, modern-day Unitarian Universalism is not Unitarian in theology. Despite its name, this denomination does not necessarily promote either belief in One God or universal salvation. It is merely the inheritor of the Unitarian and Universalist church system in America. Though there are Unitarians within the UUA, there is no creed or doctrine that one must affirm to join a Unitarian Universalist congregation. This makes it very different from many other faith groups. Today, the majority of Unitarian Universalists do not identify themselves as Christians. Jesus and the Bible are generally treated as exceptional sources of inspiration, along with the holy people and traditions around the world. Unitarian Universalists base their community on a set of Principles and Purposes, rather than on a prophet or creed. Notable Unitarian Universalists include Tim Berners-Lee (founder of the World Wide Web), Pete Seeger, U. S. Congressman Pete Stark, former U. S. Senator Mike Gravel, and Christopher Reeve.

The decline of specifically Christian theology in the Unitarian churches in the United States has prompted several revival movements. Unitarian Christians within the UUA formed the Unitarian Universalist Christian Fellowship (UUCF) in 1945, a fellowship within UUA just for Christians, who were gradually becoming a minority. Similarly, the American Unitarian Conference (AUC) was founded in 2000 with four congregations, but unlike the UUCF, the AUC remains outside the UUA. The AUC's mission is "renewal of the historic Unitarian faith", and promotes a set of God-centered religious principles, but like Unitarian Universalism, it does not impose a creed on its members.

Unitarians in America, because of the developments with the Unitarian churches, have generally taken one of three courses of action to find communities in which to worship God. Some have stayed within the Unitarian churches, accepting the non-Christian nature of their congregation, but have found their needs met in the UUCF. Some Unitarians, because they felt that the mainstream UUA churches are not accepting of Christians, or that the larger Unitarian Universalist organizations are becoming too political and liberal to be considered a religious movement or faith, have decided to affiliate with the American Unitarian Conference. Most Christian Unitarians have sought out liberal Christian churches in other denominations and have made homes there.

=== Canada ===
Unitarianism arrived in Canada from Iceland and Britain. Some Canadian congregations had services in Icelandic into living memory. The first Unitarian service in Canada was held in 1832 by a minister from England, Rev. David Hughes, in a school owned by the Workman family, who were Unitarians from Belfast. The Montreal congregation, founded in 1842, called their first permanent minister, the Rev. John Cordner, of the Remonstrant Synod of Ulster. He arrived in 1843 and served as their minister for thirty-six years. Then, in 1845, a congregation in Toronto was founded whose first minister, William Adam, was a Scottish Baptist missionary who had served in India. Then, other congregations formed: Hamilton in 1889, Ottawa in 1898, the First Icelandic Unitarian Church in Winnipeg in 1891, a congregation in Vancouver in 1909, and a congregation in Victoria in 1910. Individual Canadian congregations had ties to the British association until they were disrupted by World War II, when relations to Unitarians in the United States became stronger.

Universalism found its way to Canada during the 19th century, for the most part brought by settlers from the United States. The Universalist concepts of universal reconciliation, a loving and forgiving God, and the brother/sisterhood of all people were welcomed by those for whom the partialist view or predestination were no longer acceptable. Universalist congregations formed, with the exception of the congregation in Halifax in 1837, mostly in rural towns and villages in lower Quebec and the Maritimes and in southern Ontario. Universalism in Canada followed a corresponding decline as in the United States, and today the three remaining congregations at Olinda, Ontario founded in 1880, North Hatley, Quebec founded in 1886, and Halifax, Nova Scotia have since the 1960s been part of the Canadian Unitarian Council (CUC).

The CUC was formed on 14 May 1961, one day before the UUA in the United States, but the two functioned in close association until money exchange and other complications led to greater independence, with the CUC in 2002 assuming the direct delivery of services to Canadian congregations that were formerly delivered by the UUA. The UUA continues to provide ministerial settlement services to CUC member congregations.

The Unitarian Service Committee, established during World War II as an overseas emergency relief agency, began under the capable direction of Dr. Lotta Hitschmanova and initially supported largely by Unitarians, now continues as a separate agency called USC Canada and draws support throughout Canada for its humanitarian work in many parts of the world.

The first ordination of a Canadian Unitarian minister after the organizational separation of the CUC and the UUA was held at the First Unitarian Church of Victoria, British Columbia, in 2002. Rev. Brian Kiely, who was to give the ordination sermon, was told (partly in jest) that he must define Canadian Unitarianism, as Rev. Channing had at that New England ordination sermon of 1819. The simile Rev. Kiely chose was that Canadian Unitarianism is like a doughnut, the richness is in the circle of fellowship, not a creedal centre.

== Modern period ==
=== 20th century ===
In 1928, the British and Foreign Unitarian Association merged with the Sunday School Association, with which it had been sharing offices for decades as the General Assembly of Unitarian and Free Christian Churches. The General Assembly is still the umbrella organisation for British Unitarianism, which has its headquarters, Essex Hall, in the same place in central London.

=== 21st century ===
In May 2004, Rev. Peter Hughes, vice-chairman of the East Lancashire Unitarian Mission and a minister at Chowbent Chapel founded in 1645 in Atherton, Greater Manchester, published an article in the movement's journal, The Inquirer, and gave an interview to The Times where he warned of the extinction of the Unitarian Church. According to The Times, "the church has fewer than 6,000 members in Britain; half of whom are aged over 65." He added, referring to Toxteth Chapel in Liverpool, the movement's oldest building, where he was brought up, "they have had no minister since 1976 and the Unitarian cause there is effectively dead." The denomination's president, Dawn Buckle, a retired lecturer in education, denied that the movement was in a terminal phase and described it as a "thriving community capable of sustaining growth". There are more than 180 Unitarian congregations in Britain as part of the General Assembly of Unitarian and Free Christian Churches.

Entirely separate from the General Assembly, and generally with no historical descent from the British and Foreign Unitarian Association (1825–1928), there are a number of other denominations and small groups that look to earlier periods of Unitarianism as influences. This includes both groups looking back to the early Polish, Dutch, and English "Socinians" of the 17th century such as the Restoration Fellowship of Sir Anthony Buzzard, 3rd Baronet, and those looking to the later "biblical unitarianism" of Robert Spears. Many of these groups are nontrinitarian in theology, liberal in some political areas—such as conscientious objection, but fundamentalist in regard to the Bible, and conservative in areas such as homosexuality or women priests. Some of these groups however have women ministers.

Recently, some religious groups have adopted the term "Biblical Unitarianism" to distinguish their theology from modern liberal Unitarianism.

=== Unitarianism's spread to other countries ===
==== Germany ====
There are currently five separate groups of Unitarians in Germany:

- The Unitarische Freie Religionsgemeinde (Unitarian Free Religious Community, then called German Catholics) was founded in 1845 in Frankfurt am Main.

- The Religionsgemeinschaft Freier Protestanten ("Religious Community of Free Protestants") was formed in 1876 in Germany's Rheinhessen region. in 1911, their newspaper took on the subtitle "deutsch-unitarische Blätter" ("German Unitarian Gazette") as leader Rudolf Walbaum wanted to connect to American Unitarians. After the World War II, several groups with close ties to the Nazi Party and to the Nazi ideology started migrating to this group and occupying its decision-making organs. Most of the original "Free Protestants" then left the movement, which in 1950 changed itarias name to Deutsche Unitarier Religionsgemeinschaft ("German Unitarian Religious Community"). The organization's leaders and most of its members came from those Nazi groups and it was firmly anchored in the extreme far-right German scene well into the 1980s. It is the only Unitarian group in Germany to belong to the ICUU.

- The Unitarische Kirche in Berlin (Unitarian Church in Berlin) was founded by Hansgeorg Remus in 1948.

- The Christliche Unitarier (Christian Unitarians) a unitarian-christian group in Germany and Austria founded in 2018.

- The Unitarian Universalist Fellowship of Frankfurt is an international, English-speaking liberal religious community serving the Rhein-Main area. It is part of the European Unitarian Universalists.

==== Denmark ====
In 1900, Det fri Kirkesamfund (literally, The Free Congregation) was founded by a group of liberal Christians in Copenhagen. Since 1908, the church is outside the Folkekirke (the Danish Lutheran state church). In Aarhus, another Unitarian congregation was founded at this time by the Norwegian Unitarian pastor and writer Kristofer Janson (1841–1917); it has since closed. Often labeled and considered as a "pioneer" or "precursor" (in a spiritual manner) to the Unitarian movement in Denmark was the Icelandic theologian Magnús Eiríksson (1806–1881), who lived in Copenhagen from 1831 until his death in 1881.

==== Sweden ====
Inspired by the writings of Theodore Parker, the Swedish writer Klas Pontus Arnoldson founded in Gothenburg in 1871 the Unitarian association Sanningssökarna ("The Truth Seekers")—later also found in Stockholm. This association also published the periodical Sanningssökaren ("The Truth Seeker"). Two other Unitarian associations were founded in 1882 (one of them in Stockholm). In 1888, Unitarians asked the Swedish King for permission to establish yet another Unitarian association in Gothenburg but were turned down because Unitarianism was not regarded as a Christian religion. Later, many Unitarians turned to theosophy. In 1974, members of The Religion and Culture Association in Malmö founded The Free Church of Sweden and Rev. Ragnar Emilsen would be its pastor, ordained 1987 to Unitarian minister for Sweden and Finland and later the first to become Unitarian bishop of Scandinavia; he died February 2008. In 1999, the church changed its name to The Unitarian Church in Sweden.

==== Norway ====
In 1892 and 1893, the Norwegian Unitarian ministers Hans Tambs Lyche and Kristofer Janson returned from America and at once started independently of each other to introduce Unitarianism. In 1894, Tambs Lyche failed to organize a Unitarian Church in Oslo (then Kristiania) but managed to publish Norway's first Unitarian periodical (Free Words). In January 1895, Kristofer Janson founded The Church of Brotherhood in Oslo, which was to be the first Unitarian church—where he stayed as the congregation's pastor for only three years. In 1904, Herman Haugerud was to return to Norway from America and to become the last Unitarian pastor to The Unitarian Society (which The Church of Brotherhood now was renamed). Pastor Haugerud died in 1937, and the Unitarian church ceased to exist shortly after. Between 1986 and 2003, different Unitarian groups were active in Oslo. In 2004, these merged into The Unitarian Association, which registered as a religious society according to Norwegian law on 20 April 2005 under the name The Unitarian Association (The Norwegian Unitarian Church). Later, "Bét Dávid" was added to the name: The Bét Dávid Unitarian Association (The Norwegian Unitarian Church). The church is akin to both Transylvanian Unitarianism, and Judaism, hence the name bét referring to the Hebrew word for "house" and Dávid, which is the name of the first Transylvanian Unitarian bishop Dávid Ferenc (1510–1579). In 2006, this church was associated with the International Council of Unitarians and Universalists (ICUU). Since 2007, there is also a Unitarian Universalist Fellowship independent of The Norwegian Unitarian Church. This fellowship is located in the Oslo area.

==== Spain ====
Although the pioneer and first martyr of European Unitarianism was a Spaniard, Michael Servetus, the Spanish Inquisition and the religious hegemony of the Roman Catholic Church over both the State and the Spanish society, blocked for centuries any possibility of developing a Unitarian Church in Spain.

This situation began to change in the 19th century. A liberal Spanish writer and former priest, José María Blanco-White, became a Unitarian during his exile in England and remained so until the end of his life (1841). At the end of the century, a group of liberal Spanish intellectuals and reformers, the Krausistas (who received this name for being followers of German idealist philosopher Karl Krause), were admirers of American Unitarian leaders William Ellery Channing and Theodore Parker, and wished that natural religion and religious rationalism were more present in Spain, although they did not create any liberal church to push that process forward.

The Spanish Civil War (1936–1939) put an end to any expectations of change and liberal developments in Spain for several decades. After the death of dictator Francisco Franco and the approval of the Spanish Constitution of 1978, religious freedom was finally established in Spain (although still with many restrictions in actual practice). In 2000, the Sociedad Unitaria Universalista de España (SUUE) was founded in Barcelona, and in 2001 it became a member of the International Council of Unitarians and Universalists (ICUU). In 2005, it changed its name to the Unitarian Universalist Religious Society of Spain to achieve legal status as a religious organization under the Spanish law on Religious Freedom, but the application was also rejected.
