= Biblical unitarianism =

Unitarian Christian denomination

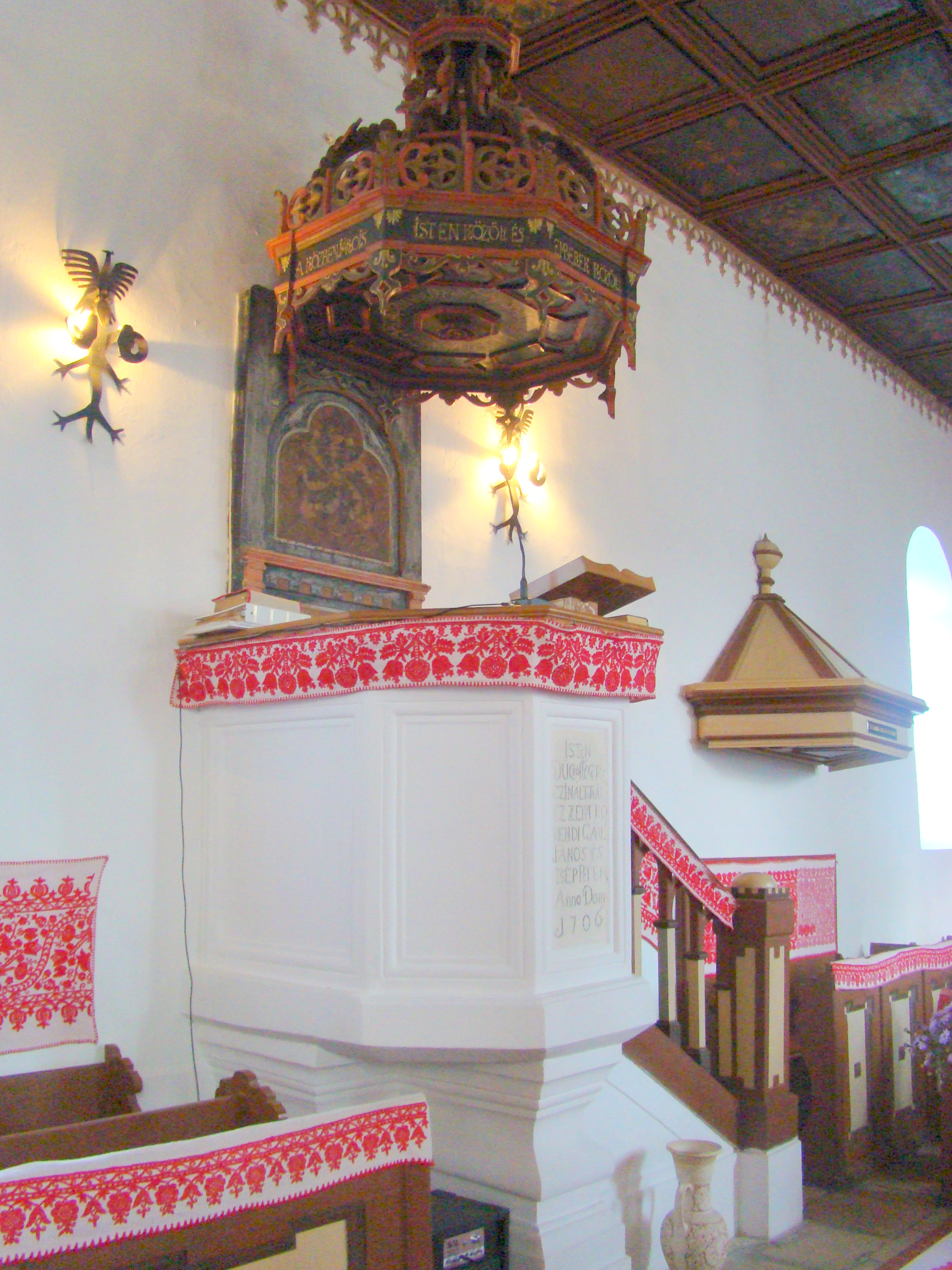
The pulpit of the Unitarian Church of Plăiești in Cluj County, Romania

Biblical unitarianism (otherwise capitalized as biblical Unitarianism, sometimes abbreviated as BU) is a Unitarian Christian tradition whose adherents affirm the Christian Bible as their sole authority, and from it base their beliefs that God the Father is one singular being, and that Jesus is God's son but not divine.

Unitarian Christianity began in the Polish–Lithuanian Commonwealth and in Transylvania in the mid-16th century; the Christian denomination that emerged is known as the Unitarian Church of Transylvania, founded by the Unitarian preacher and theologian Ferenc Dávid (c. 1520 – 1579). The creed of the Unitarian Church of Transylvania is:

"I believe in one God, the creator of life, our providential Father. I believe in Jesus, the best son of God, our true teacher. I believe in the Holy Spirit. I believe in the mission of the Unitarian Church. I believe in the forgiveness of sins and in eternal life. Amen."

The early Unitarian Christian leader Demeter Hunyadi led the effort to catechize the faithful. The first Unitarian Christian confession of faith was the Consensus Ministrorum, which holds to a Unitarian view of God and teaches that Jesus Christ should be adored; the confession of faith titled the Complanatio (1638) established the necessity of infant baptism and reception of the eucharist. The widely used Racovian Catechism (1605) of the Polish Brethren explicated the Unitarian Christian faith from a Socinian perspective, supporting its doctrine with proof-texts from the Bible.

Used to herald this historic Unitarian Christian faith that emerged after the Reformation, the term "biblical Unitarianism" is connected first with Robert Spears and Samuel Sharpe of the Christian Life magazine in the 1880s. As liberal Unitarian churches moved away from mainstream church traditions and, in some instances in the United States, towards merger with Universalism, bodies of traditional Unitarian Christians sought to distinguish themselves by using the terms "Biblical Unitarian" or "Unitarian Christian" or by asserting traditional definitions of the "Unitarian" denomination of Christianity.

The history of Unitarianism was as a "scripturally oriented movement" which denied the Trinity and held various understandings of Jesus. Over time, however—specifically, in the mid-19th century—liberal proponents of Unitarianism moved away from a belief in the necessity of the Bible as the source of religious truth. The nomenclature "biblical" in "biblical Unitarianism" is to identify the groups that did not make such a move, and continue to herald the Unitarian Christian faith based on biblical teaching.

== Early Unitarians and the Bible ==
Biblical unitarians claim that history shows that the earliest Christians (especially in the first century CE) believed in one God and did not believe that Jesus was himself God.

Their beliefs are based primarily on arguments that both Old Testament and New Testament describe a strictly Unitarian theology with no explicit description of God as three co-equal persons of one substance, and that Trinitarianism is a theory that was developed by some church leaders over the course of centuries, heavily influenced by their contemporary cultures and philosophies. It was not until disputes with Arius that unitarianism began to be labeled as heretical.

To support these arguments Biblical unitarians point to the statements of the Bible that consistently proclaim the unity of God along with descriptions of Jesus as God’s anointed, human Messiah—distinct from and subordinate to God. For example: “One God, the Father," and "One Lord, Jesus the Christ."

There is also historical evidence for the gradual development of Trinitarian doctrine from the second century through the fourth century, culminating in the formal statement of the Council of Constantinople in 381 CE.

Historians such as George Huntston Williams (1914–2000) rarely employ the term "biblical Unitarian," as it would be anachronistic. Those individuals and congregations that we may now think of as Unitarians went through a range of beliefs about Jesus: that he was eternally pre-existent but was created by God the Father (Arianism); or that God the Father and God the Son were two distinct Gods (Binitarianism); or that he originated at the virgin birth (Socinianism); or that he was simply a godly man (Adoptionism or Psilanthropism).

For early unitarians such as Henry Hedworth, who introduced the term "Unitarian" from Holland into England in 1673, the idea that Unitarianism was "Biblical" was axiomatic, since the whole thrust of the 16th and 17th century Unitarian and Arian movements was based on sola scriptura argumentation from Scripture, as in the case of the Christological writings of Isaac Newton.

== The Unitarian Churches (1774 onwards) ==
The Unitarian Church of Transylvania remained a conservative "Biblical" Unitarian movement largely isolated from developments in the West. The Summa Universae Theologiae Christianae secundum Unitarios (1787) represents a conservative position that held into the late 19th century.

In the West, Theophilus Lindsey established the first avowedly Unitarian church in England in 1774 at Essex Street Chapel. Nontrinitarianism was against the law until the Doctrine of the Trinity Act 1813, but legal difficulties with the authorities were overcome with the help of barrister John Lee, who later became Attorney General. Unitarians of this time continued to consider their teachings as "Biblical", though increasingly questioning the inspiration of the Bible and the accounts of the miraculous. (See Rational Dissenters for more.) Divergence in the Unitarian Church was increasingly evident after 1800 with the majority following the rationalist views of writers such as Thomas Belsham and Richard Wright, who wrote against the miraculous conception, while a minority held to the views of traditionalists.

The New Encyclopædia Britannica notes that the Transcendentalist movement of Ralph Waldo Emerson "shattered rationalist, biblical Unitarianism — now grown conservative — and replaced it with intuitional religion and social idealism. When Unitarianism spread to the newly opened Middle West, its religious fundamentals changed to human aspiration and scientific truth, rather than Christianity and the Bible."

== First uses of the term ==
An early example of the term "Biblical Unitarianism" occurs in the British and Foreign Evangelical Review (1882) in an article on the "Waning of Biblical Unitarianism". In the following year, Peter William Clayden's biography of Samuel Sharpe (1883) describes him as a "Biblical Unitarian", adding, "His intensely practical mind, and his business training, joined with his great though rational reverence for the Bible, made him long for definite views expressed in scripture language."

The context of the term in the above examples relates to the tension from the 1830s onward between more traditional and relatively scripture-fundamentalist Unitarians and those advocating a freer approach such as transcendentalists Theodore Parker and James Martineau. This conflict came to a head in 1876 when Robert Spears resigned from the British and Foreign Unitarian Association and, with the support of Sharpe, a former president of the Association, began to publish a rival magazine. In this context, Sharpe is referred to again by John M. Robertson (1929) as a "Biblical Unitarian," and adds that Sharpes' magazine, The Christian Life, was largely aimed at combatting growing agnosticism in Unitarian pulpits. However, though Sharpe may have used the term, and later been called, "Biblical Unitarian", he did not set up any lobby group of that name within Unitarianism.

The label of "Biblical Unitarianism" is also attributed to earlier generations than Sharpe by Henry Gow (1928), who even compares this with "Channing Unitarianism", a reference to the still relatively scripture-fundamentalist views of William Ellery Channing: "... and for a time, Unitarianism became the faith of many, if not most, of the leading citizens and thinkers of New England. As in England, it was a definitely Biblical Unitarianism."

Alexander Elliott Peaston (1940) pinpoints 1862 as the year of change from "Biblical Unitarianism" to newer models in England, where formerly belief in miracles and the resurrection were dominant. The entry of higher criticism into Unitarianism via Alexander Geddes and others dealt a "blow at the biblical Unitarianism of Joseph Priestley". Walter H. Burgess (1943) adopts the same terminology — "Biblical Unitarianism" vs. "the newer Unitarianism" — to describe the tension in Wales in the 1870s between the deists David and Charles Lloyd vs. Gwilym Marles. A similar example occurs in quotation marks from historian Stange (1984).

Earl Morse Wilbur, in his monumental A History of Unitarianism (1945), does not describe any group by the terminology "Biblical Unitarian", though the tension between the fundamentalist origins of Unitarianism and post-Christian direction of late 19th century Unitarianism does begin to appear in the later volumes.

== Modern use of the term ==
Although Spears and Sharpe made appeal to the term "Biblical Unitarianism" in The Christian life (e.g. Volume 5, 1880), an appeal to the concept of "Biblical Unitarianism" by individuals and churches is rare until after Unitarian Universalism was formed from the merger in 1961 of two historically Christian denominations, the Universalist Church of America and the American Unitarian Association. In some cases in the 1870s where the name "Unitarian" was still considered too associated with "the narrowly Biblical type of liberal theologian", other names, such as "Christian Free Church", were employed. Larsen (2011) applies Spears' "biblical Unitarian" to him in regard to his 1876 resignation.

Identification of the conservative biblical-literalist strain of Unitarianism is found also in consideration of conservative Scottish Unitarians such as George Harris, described as a supporter of "old biblical Unitarianism." (Stange, 1984).

The term "biblical Unitarian" only begins to reappear frequently in the 1990s in the writings of those associated with a revival of interest in early Unitarian figures such as Fausto Sozzini and John Biddle ("the Father of English Unitarianism"), as well as Arians like William Whiston. An example is the journal A Journal from the Radical Reformation, A Testimony to Biblical Unitarianism (1993–present).

Alongside this historical interest in the Radical Reformation, during the 1990s the term "biblical unitarian" also begins to appear in antitrinitarian publications without either 'b' or 'u' capitalized.

== Denominations ==
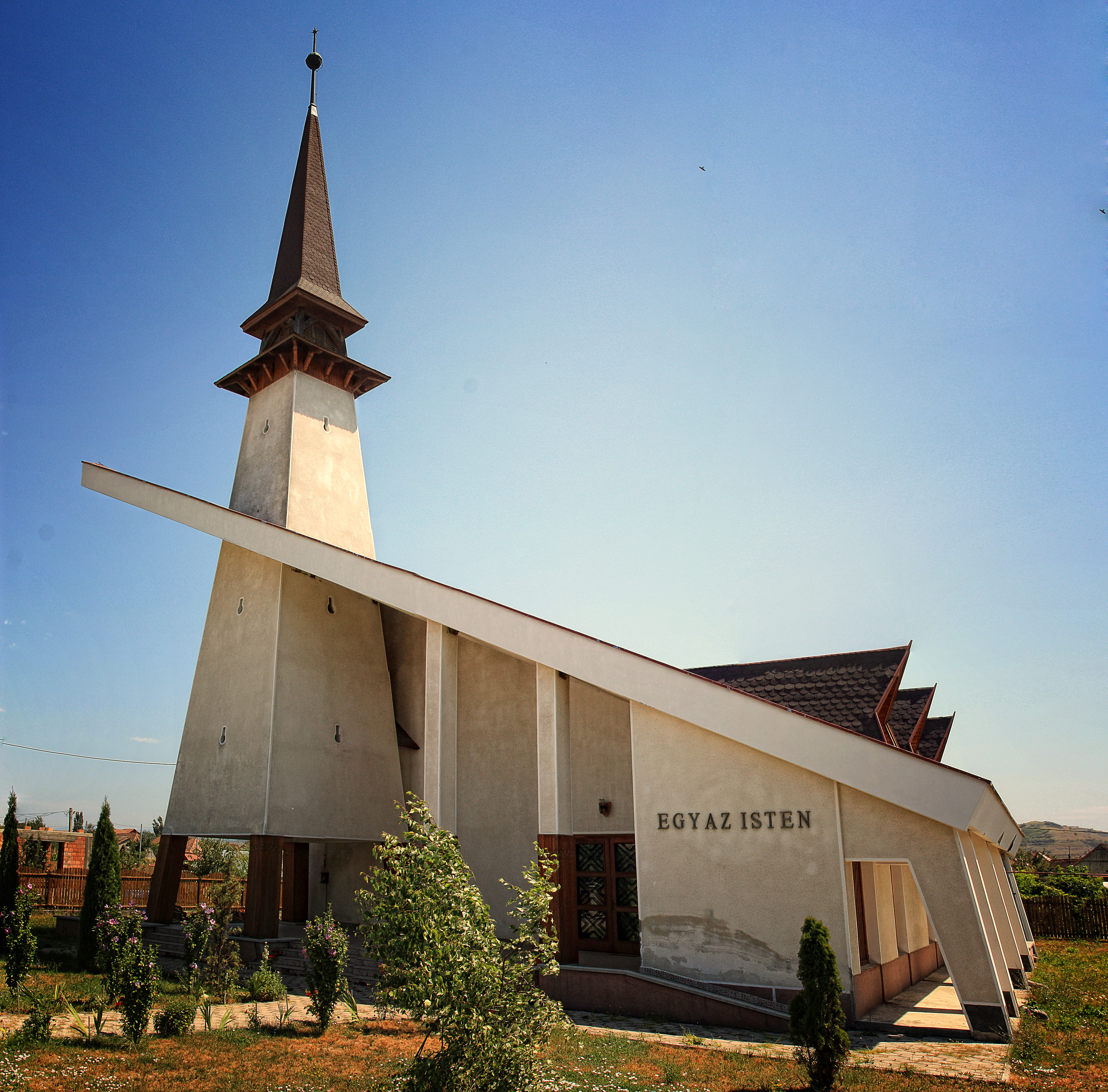
The Unitarian Church of Sângeorgiu de Pădure (Transylvania)

The Unitarian Church of Transylvania, founded by the Unitarian preacher and theologian Ferenc Dávid (c. 1520 – 1579), is regarged as the Mother Church of the Unitarian tradition of Christianity, and is affiliated with the Protestant Theological Institute of Cluj. There may be other continuing groups of Christian Unitarians descended from the Unitarian churches who look to the works of Dávid, as well as those of Spears, Sharpe and earlier. The Unitarian Christian Alliance represents various biblical Unitarian churches.

Additionally, the Church of God General Conference (CoGGC), with 5,000 members in the USA, and Christadelphians, with 60,000 members worldwide share nontrinitarian, specifically Socinian Christology, and both have historians — Anthony Buzzard among CoGGC, the geographer Alan Eyre among Christadelphians — who have acknowledged works such as the Racovian Catechism and Biddle's Twofold Catechism as prefiguring and compatible with their beliefs. Christadelphians are more reserved than CoGGC in association with the name "Unitarian", given that the Unitarian Church still exists in Britain and many of its independent congregations are post-Christian. Although the Christadelphians' early growth in Scotland in the 1850s was partly a result of intake of Scottish Nonconformists and Free Church members including conservative Unitarians, members also came from the disaffected nontrinitarian wing of the Restoration Movement. John Thomas, founder of the Christadelphians, was equally unsympathetic to Trinitarians and Unitarians, saying that an exposition of scripture clears away a lot of 'rubbish' from discussion on the Godhead and delivers a 'quietus' to Trinitarianism and Unitarianism.

In his overview of Biblical Monotheism Today, along with Christadelphians and the CoGGC, Professor Rob J. Hyndman lists the Church of God of the Abrahamic Faith (aka Church of the Blessed Hope), The Way International, Spirit and Truth Fellowship International, Living Hope International Ministries, and Christian Disciples Church as current "Biblical monotheistic groups". He also recognises "scattered congregations meeting independently who are unaffiliated with any denomination or para-church organization", but who might interact via networks like the Worldwide Scattered Brethren Network and the Association for Christian Development.

== See also ==
- Unitarian Christian Association
- Unitarian Universalist Christian Fellowship

== Bibliography ==
- Bowers, J. D. (2007). Joseph Priestley and English Unitarianism in America. University Park, Pennsylvania: Pennsylvania State University Press. ISBN 978-0-271-02950-4. LCCN 2006100016.
- Willsky-Ciollo, Lydia (2015). American Unitarianism and the Protestant Dilemma: The Conundrum of Biblical Authority. Lanham, Maryland: Lexington Books. ISBN 978-0-7391-8892-7. LCCN 2015952384.
