= Essex Street Chapel =

Unitarian church in London, England

Coordinates: 51°30′32″N 0°11′37″W

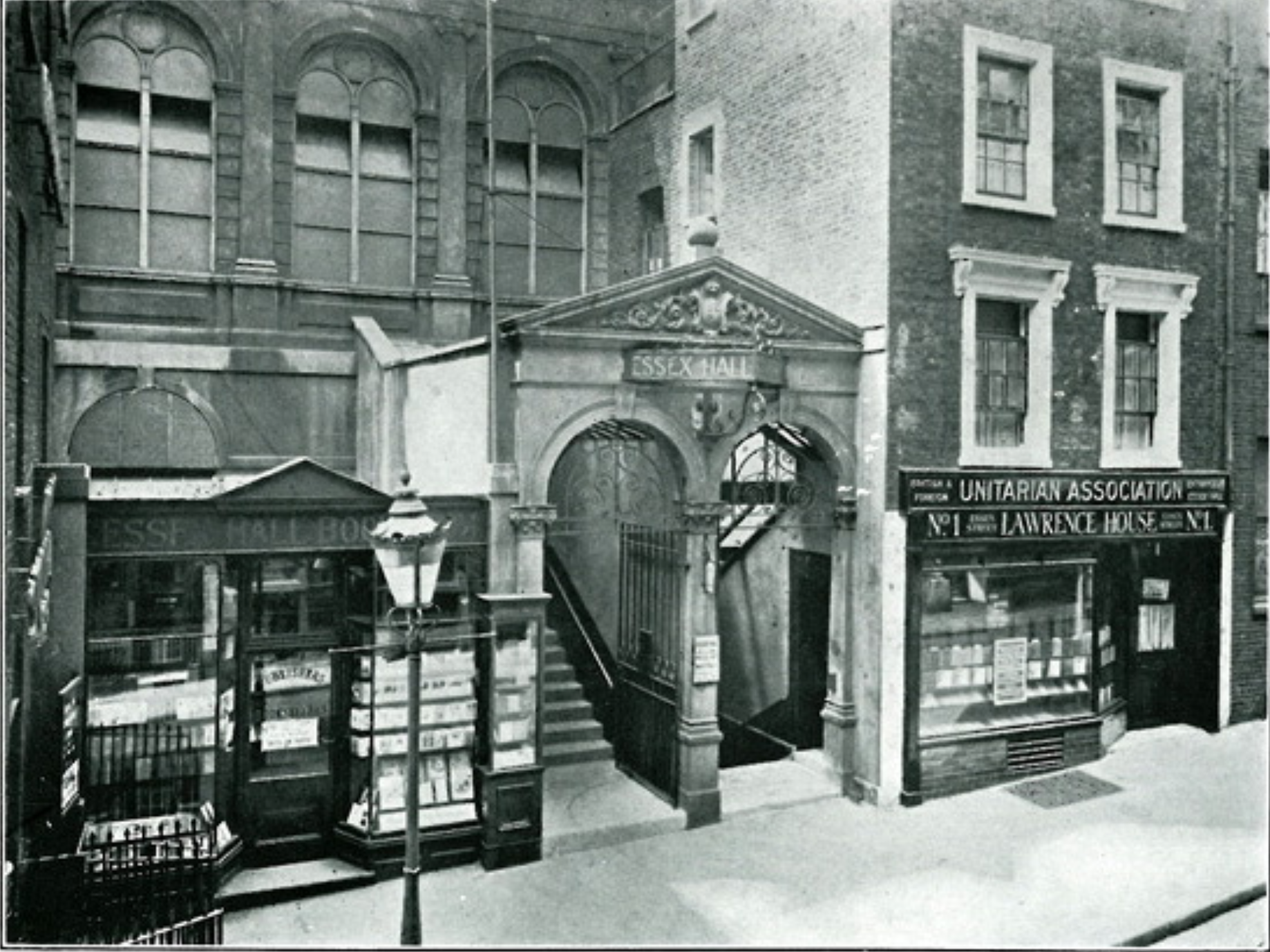
Essex Street Chapel and Hall, the since-demolished first Unitarian church building in England

Essex Street Chapel, also known as Essex Church, is a Unitarian place of worship in London. It was the first church in England set up with this doctrine, and was established when Dissenters still faced legal threat. As the birthplace of British Unitarianism, Essex Street has particularly been associated with social reformers and theologians. The congregation moved west in the 19th century, allowing the building to be turned into the headquarters for the British and Foreign Unitarian Association and the Sunday School Association. These evolved into the General Assembly of Unitarian and Free Christian Churches, the umbrella organisation for British Unitarianism, which is still based on the same site, in an office building called Essex Hall. This article deals with the buildings (1778, 1887, 1958), the history, and the current church, based in Kensington.

== Building ==
The chapel was located just off the Strand, on a site formerly occupied by Essex House, London home of the Earl of Essex, hence the name of the street and the hall. It was about halfway between the City and Westminster, in the legal district of London. From the mid-18th century, some rooms within the former nobleman's palace were used as the auction room of bookseller Samuel Paterson. This was easily adapted into a simple meeting house, but within a few years there was enough of a congregation, and enough donations, to have a new edifice raised on the foundations of the old. This was completed by 1778, with financial support from Francis Dashwood, 11th Baron le Despencer, founder of the Hellfire Club, and Thomas Brand Hollis, political radical. Another supporter and trustee was Samuel Heywood, the chief justice. Their building footprint is believed to include the Tudor chapel of Essex House. Not until 1860 did the chapel gain an organ.

== History ==
=== Lindsey's beginnings ===
The first minister was Theophilus Lindsey, who had recently left the Church of England because of his burgeoning Unitarian conviction. He had moved to London specifically to find like-minded people and to found a congregation—indeed, a denomination. Support was immediately given him by distinguished English Presbyterian ministers such as Richard Price, who had his own church in Newington Green, and Joseph Priestley, who among other things discovered oxygen. Unitarian beliefs were against the law until the Doctrine of the Trinity Act 1813, but legal difficulties with the authorities were overcome with the help of barrister John Lee, who later became Attorney-General. The inaugural service, on 17 April 1774, was reviewed as far afield as Leeds: "The congregation was respectable and numerous, and seemed to be particularly pleased with the spirit of moderation, candour and christian benevolence of the preacher whose sermon was perfectly well adapted to the occasion." Two hundred people gathered to hear Lindsey preach, including Benjamin Franklin, then an agent for the colonial Province of Massachusetts Bay. This was the first time in England that a church had formed around explicitly Unitarian beliefs.

=== The move to Kensington ===
By the 1880s demographic change, mainly the movement of population out of the very centre of London, meant that membership had fallen significantly. As long ago as 1867, Rev Robert Spears had led the formation of a Unitarian congregation a couple of miles to the west; this group had grown and moved several times, but had no home. Sir James Clarke Lawrence, Lord Mayor of London and Liberal MP, purchased and donated some land at Kensington Gravel Pits (now Palace Gardens Terrace), and a temporary corrugated iron church had been built. Meanwhile, the main Unitarian bodies, the British and Foreign Unitarian Association and the Sunday School Association, needed better offices. Eventually it was decided that they would get the Essex Street building to redevelop, and the chapel would move to join the Kensington congregation, taking with it enough money to build a splendid new church in place of the iron one.

This duly opened in 1887, under the name of Essex Church, serving the area of Kensington. Gradually the building deteriorated: air pollution attacked the stone (the effect of decades of "pea-soupers", before the passage of the Clean Air Act 1956), the steeple was removed as dangerous in 1960, the roof was shattered by blue ice from an aircraft in 1971, and by the 1970s the whole fabric had become run down. It was demolished and replaced with a modern church, with ancillary facilities. The first service was held in July 1977.

=== Essex Hall ===
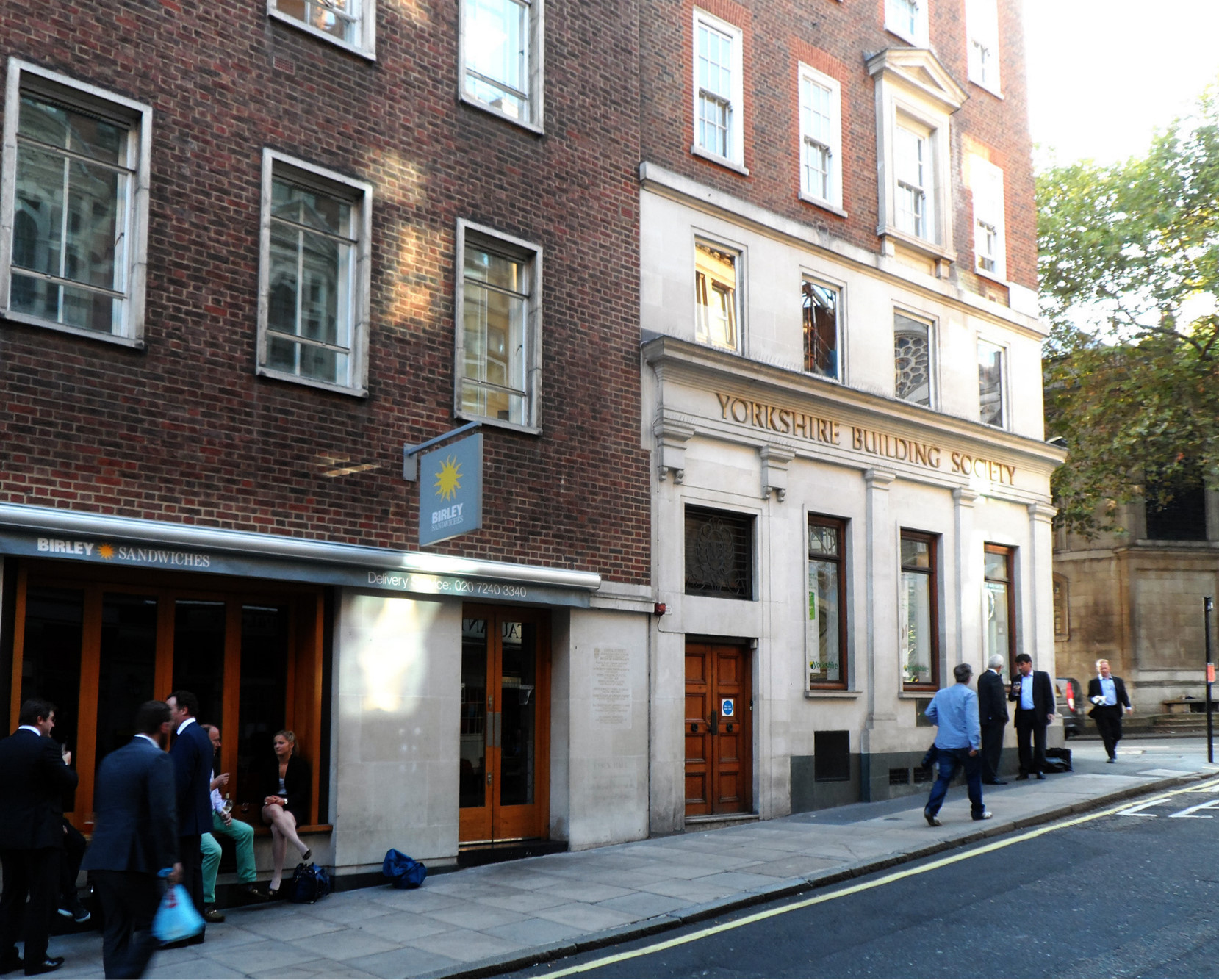
Essex Hall, Essex Street

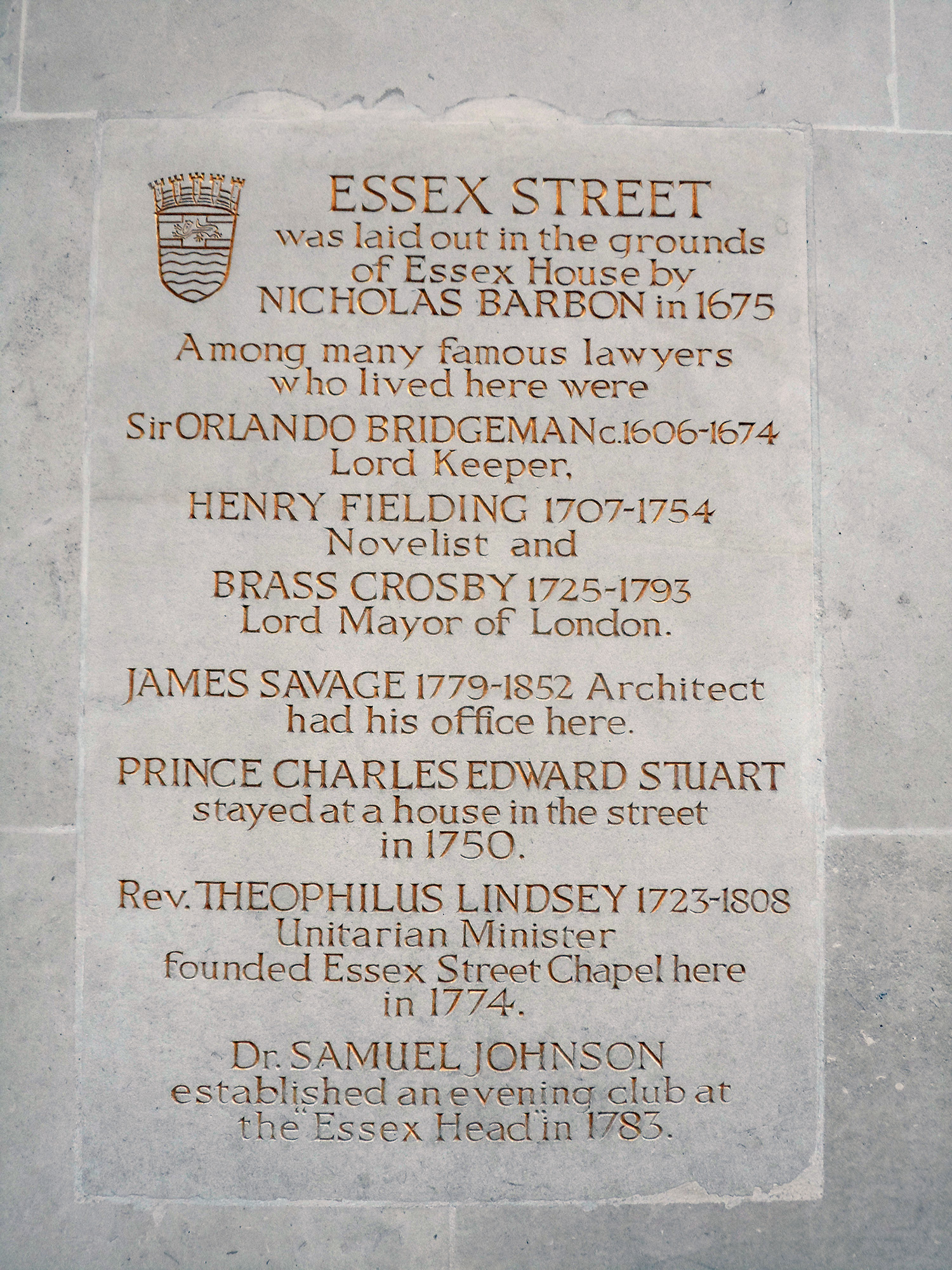
London County Council plaque on Essex Hall

In the mid-1880s, Essex Hall was razed and recreated by the architectural firm of Thomas Chatfeild-Clarke, designed for mixed use: offices and meeting rooms, but also a bookshop and reading rooms, and a great hall seating 600. It was ready a year earlier than the Kensington church, and its dedication service in 1886 featured all the great and the good of British Unitarianism.

The space was hired out for concerts and public meetings; for many years the Fabian Society met there, for example, and the Christadelphians held their AGM at Essex Hall. Public meetings could become heated: when the American Prohibitionist William "Pussyfoot" Johnson spoke at Essex Hall in 1919, he was abducted by medical students, and, off the premises, blinded by a missile. The house adjacent, number 1 Essex Street, had been donated to the trustees of the Essex Hall construction scheme, but the architects chose not to use it; during World War I it was turned into "a modest hostel for soldiers and sailors, without distinction of sect or creed, passing through or making short stays in London". In 1925 some alterations were made to Essex Hall to enable the Lyndsey Press to begin well. From 1928 the main body of British Unitarianism was the General Assembly of Unitarian and Free Christian Churches or GA, subsuming the previous organisations but continuing to operate from Essex Hall.

Much of Essex Street was demolished by enemy action in 1944. Once the bombed ruins had been removed after the war, the site served as a car park. Eventually planning permission and funding were obtained, which allowed for the construction of purpose-built offices. "What seemed at first to be a complete disaster was presently recognized as a denominational challenge, and was taken up with energy and determination," wrote the architect, Kenneth S. Tayler, A.R.I.B.A. Aside from the Unitarian headquarter functions, about half of the building's space was allocated from the outset to be leased to other organisations, thus paying the bills. From the night of the V-1 flying bomb raid until the completion of construction in 1958 – fourteen years—the work that normally took place in Essex Hall was displaced to some spare rooms at Dr Williams's Library in Gordon Square.

== Current church ==
Essex Church, known locally as Kensington Unitarians, is based at Notting Hill Gate in Kensington, West London, and runs a full programme of Sunday worship and small group ministry. It is currently led by Rev. Dr. Jane Blackall, who gained her ministerial qualification at Unitarian College, after a first career in the field of medical imaging and radiological sciences.

== List of ministers ==
- 1774, Theophilus Lindsey
- 1793, John Disney
- 1805, Thomas Belsham
- 1829, Thomas Madge
- 1859 to 1883, James Panton Ham

== People associated ==
- Augustus FitzRoy, 3rd Duke of Grafton, politician, was an early member of the congregation.
- George Brooksbank (died 1792), descendant of Stamp Brooksbank, Governor of the Bank of England, donated funds
- Samuel Shore (1738–1828), trustee of the chapel. Also vice-president of the Society for Constitutional Information.
- William Sturch, theological writer, was one of the original congregation.
- The young William Wilberforce.
- William Frend, who made contact there with Theophilus Lindsey and Joseph Priestley.
- George Harris, (1794–1859), minister, controversialist and editor.
- William Smith, M.P., abolitionist, and grandfather of Florence Nightingale and Barbara Bodichon. It was largely through his efforts that the Doctrine of the Trinity Act 1813 was passed, making it legal to practice Unitarianism.
- Henry Crabb Robinson, whose prolific diaries were bequeathed to Dr Williams's Library, the theological collection for Dissenters.
- Mary Hays, author and friend of Mary Wollstonecraft
- Samuel Carter, railway solicitor and MP
- Frederick Nettlefold, served as president of the British and Foreign Unitarian Association and the Sunday School Association. He was connected by marriage to the chief architect of the 1886 Essex Hall, and made substantial donations.
- Nathaniel Bishop Harman, MA, MB, FRCS, ophthalmologist, author of Science and Religion, father of writer Elizabeth Pakenham, Countess of Longford and of John B. Harman. The largest donation towards the construction of the 1958 Hall came from his widow, Dr. Katherine (née Chamberlain). Their descendants include politician Harriet Harman, and the writers Lady Antonia Fraser, Lady Rachel Billington, and Thomas Pakenham.
- Rupert Potter, son of industrialist and social reformer Edmund Potter, and father of author and conservationist Beatrix Potter.

== Bibliography ==
- Rowe, Mortimer (1959). "The History of Essex Hall". London: Lindsey Press. Archived from the original on 16 January 2012.
- Williams, Raymond (1987). "Essex Church in Kensington 1887–1987: History of a Unitarian Cause" (PDF).
