= Alan Eyre =

British-born Jamaican geographer and environmentalist (1930–2020)

Lawrence Alan Eyre (born Leeds, 1930 – 3 June 2020) was a British-born Jamaican geographer and environmentalist. He was also a member of the Christadelphian church.

Alan Eyre was co-founder of the Department of Geography of the University of the West Indies, Mona, Jamaica. His academic work has focused on the political geography of shanty towns and the degradation of the tropical rain forest.

== Work on shanty towns ==
In 1972 Eyre published one of the first Caribbean studies on urban geography, showing that the inner city tenements and not the shanty town was the first destination of rural migrants, then, when stable work is found and income saved, outward to the peri-urban shanty towns; and noting income variance in the shanty towns. Eyre was one of the first urban geographers in Caribbean-Latin American context to clearly document the inner-city/peri-urban shanty distinction. In a later study (1984) Eyre found evidence of both marginality and self-improvement in the Jamaican shanty towns. Eyre's work (1984, 1986) also documented party political violence as a component of peri-urban geography, hurricane housing (1989) and self-help housing (1997).

== Rainforest preservation ==
In Slow death of a tropical rainforest: The Cockpit Country of Jamaica, West Indies (1994) Eyre proposed that the Cockpit Country, Jamaica's largest remaining contiguous rainforest be zoned a World Heritage Site in the face of continuing encroachment and degradation, despite proposals for protection having originated as early as Cotterell (1979) and Aiken (1986). Eyre's study was one of the main academic starting points for a petition sponsored by the Cockpit Country Stakeholders' Group and Jamaica Environmental Advocacy Network which was submitted to Prime Minister Bruce Golding in 2006.

== Academic publications ==
For a partial bibliography of Eyre's many papers on peri-urban geography see Robert B. Potter, Dennis Conway (eds), Self-Help Housing, the Poor, and the State in the Caribbean, University of Tennessee Press, 1997, p. 101.

- "Tidewater Shorelines in Broward and Palm Beach counties, Florida: an analysis of characteristics and changes interpreted from color, color-infrared and thermal aerial imagery" Remote Sensing and Interpretation Laboratory, 1971
- "Geographic Aspects of Population Dynamics in Jamaica" 1972
- "The June 12th, 1979 Flood Disaster in Jamaica: a satellite view" 1979
- "Deforestation in Jamaica", Journal of the Scientific Research Council of Jamaica, Volume 6, Issue 2, Scientific Research Council of Jamaica, 1987
- "Slow Death of a Tropical Rainforest: The Cockpit Country of Jamaica, West Indies" 1994
- A New Geography of the Caribbean
- Land and Population in the Sugar Belt of Jamaica
- The Botanic Gardens of Jamaica
- The Shanty Town
- Quasi-Urban Melange Settlement
- "An Investigation of Remote Sensing of Vacant and Unutilized Land in an Urbanized Coastal Area of Southeast Florida"
- Tidewater Shorelines in Broward and Palm Beach Counties, Florida
- Environment and Education
- Tropical Forests as Seen From Space

== Religious publications ==
Eyre's religious publications primarily concern the Polish Brethren and other antecedents of Christadelphian and Biblical Unitarian views:

- The Protesters
- Brethren in Christ
- At Last, True Christianity
- Jakub Paleolog (i.e. the Greek Unitarian Jacobus Palaeologus) 1997, A Journal from the Radical Reformation, Spring 1997, Vol. 6, No. 3
- A Jamaican Love Story
