= Edward Tagart =

Edward Tagart (8 October 1804 – 12 October 1858) was an English Unitarian divine.

== Biography ==
Tagart was born at Bristol and educated there and at Bath Grammar School (King Edward's School, Bath). In 1820 he entered the dissenting theological academy Manchester College, which was then at York, and which eventually became Harris Manchester College, Oxford. He was ordained in 1825 as the minister of the Octagon Chapel, Norwich. In 1828 he moved to the York Street chapel (now Browning Hall) in Walworth, south London. In 1833 the congregation moved to a new chapel in Little Portland Street, off Regent Street. Tagart worked there for a quarter of a century. In 1844 the congregation gave him a set of plate with an inscription by Charles Dickens, who at that time attended his services.

Tagart was foreign secretary, then general secretary 1842–58, of the British and Foreign Unitarian Association. He was a fellow of the Linnean Society, the Geological Society and the Society of Antiquaries. He was a trustee of Dr Williams's foundations 1832–58.

In August 1858 Tagart went on an official visit to the Unitarians of Transylvania. On his way home he was taken ill in Brussels and died there.

== Publications ==
- Reply to Address in The Service at the Settlement of the Rev. Edward Tagart, as Minister of the Octagon Chapel, Norwich, August 10, 1825, Arthur Taylor, London, 1825
- A Memoir of the late Captain Peter Heywood, R. N., Effingham Wilson, London, 1832
- Remarks on mathematical or demonstrative reasoning, John Green, London, 1837
- Sketches of the lives and characters of the leading Reformers of the Sixteenth Century, John Green, London, 1843
- Remarks on Bentham, His Obligations to Priestley, and His Early Studies, Charles Green, London, 1844
- Locke's writings and philosophy historically considered, and vindicated from the charge of contributing to the scepticism of Hume, Longman, London, 1855 (of this Hallam wrote, 'I think it will have the effect of restoring Locke to the place he ought to take in the estimation of his country')

== Family ==
Tagart married in 1828, Helen Bourn (1797–1871), daughter of Joseph Bourn, a grandson of Samuel Bourn the younger. She was the widow of Thomas Martineau, brother of Harriet Martineau, and survived him with an only son and three daughters. She is often known as Helen Martineau.
