= Matilda Sharpe =

British writer, teacher, educational reformer and painter

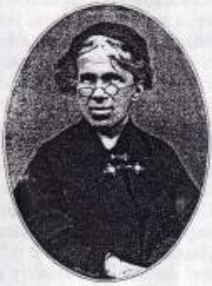
Matilda Sharpe - founder of Channing School

Matilda Sharpe (4 April 1830 – 30 April 1916) was a British writer, teacher, educational reformer and painter. She founded what is now Channing School.

== Life ==
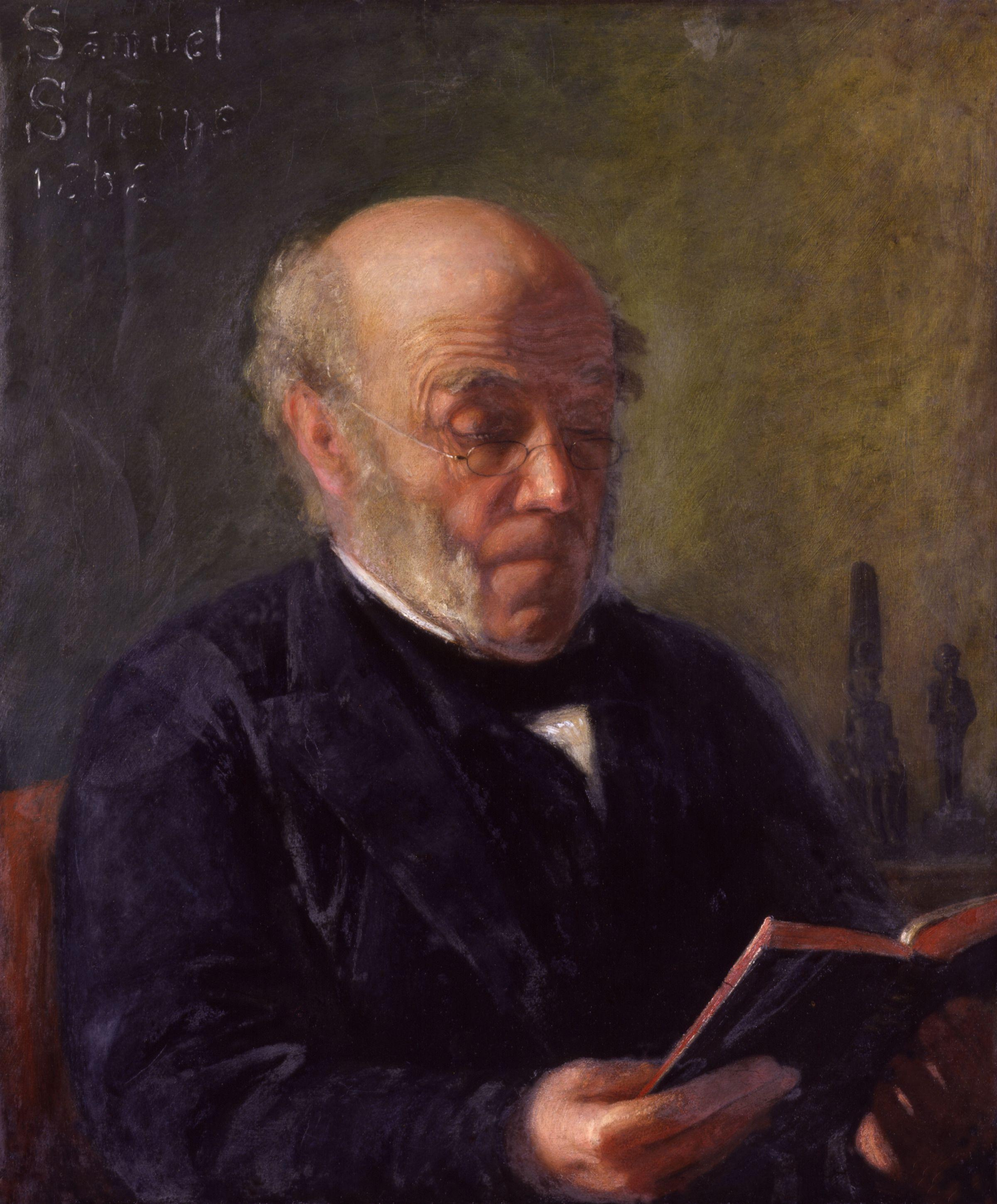
Matilda's portrait of her father, Samuel.

She was the daughter of Sarah Sharpe, an artist, and Samuel Sharpe who was a banker and an Egyptologist. Her parents were Unitarian, rich and cousins.

She was a talented artist, exhibiting at the Royal Academy, but her vocation was teaching. During the 1870s she volunteered her time and money to several schools. She was an inspiring teacher and the leading New South Wales politician, William Holman, attributed his success to her teaching.

In Highgate in north London, she founded Channing House School (after Robert Spears' idea) and a Unitarian Chapel in Despard Road. She devoted most of her energy and her money to the school. She believed in education for all and taxing the rich to pay for it. She was keen on homilies and published books of these and a book of poetry.

She died at her home in Highgate in 1915. Several of her portraits are in the National Portrait Gallery, London.

== Selected publications ==
- Old favourites from the elder poets, with a few newer friends. A selection by M. Sharpe. Williams and Norgate, London, 1881. Second revised edition, Methuen, 1912. An anthology of nine women poets, particularly Anna Laetitia Barbauld.
- Never forget: A collection of precepts. Griffith & Farran, London, 1890.
- The journey to paradise, or, flight of the soul to its maker. A heavenly day dream set down by Matilda Sharpe. Christian Life Office, London, 1899.
