= Robert Spears (minister) =

British minister (1825–1899)

Robert Spears (Newcastle upon Tyne 25 September 1825 – Highgate, London 25 February 1899) was a British Unitarian minister who was editor of the confessedly "Biblical Unitarian" Christian Life weekly.

== Life ==
He was fifth son by the second wife of John Spears, foreman of an ironworks, and was born at Lemington, parish of Newburn, Northumberland. His father was a Calvinistic Presbyterian, but the family attended the parish church. Brought up as an engineering smith, his love of reading led him to leave this calling and set up a school in his native village. He joined the New Connexion Methodists; a debate (1845) at Newcastle upon Tyne between Joseph Barker and William Cooke led him to the conviction that doctrine must be expressed in ‘the language of scripture.’ In 1846 he was master of the New Connexion school at Scotswood-on-Tyne, and was taken on trial as a local preacher.

A lecture at Blaydon in 1848 by George Harris (1794–1859) brought him into relations with Harris, and was followed by an introduction to the unitarian body in 1849. Leaving the Methodists, he became Unitarian minister without salary at Sunderland (1852–8). There he conducted a very successful school, and originated (1856) a monthly religious magazine, the Christian Freeman. He removed to a pastorate at Stockton-on-Tees (1858–61), where he originated (30 December 1859) the Stockton Gazette (later the North-Eastern Gazette).

In 1861 Spears attracted the attention of Robert Brook Aspland, was invited to London by Sir James Clarke Lawrence, and became (1862) minister of Stamford Street chapel, Blackfriars. In 1867 he was elected co-secretary of the British and Foreign Unitarian Association with Aspland, on whose death (1869) he became general secretary, reviving it and nearly quadrupling its income. In 1874 he left Stamford Street to take charge of a new congregation at College Chapel, Stepney Green.

His theological conservatism was the cause of his resigning in 1876 the denominational secretaryship. He at once established (20 May 1876) a weekly paper, the Christian Life, as an organ of biblical and missionary unitarianism; in 1889 he bought up the Unitarian Herald, a Manchester organ (which he had been invited to manage at its establishment in 1861), and amalgamated it with his paper. In 1886, aided by Matilda Sharpe, younger daughter of Samuel Sharpe, he established Channing School for Girls, primarily for the daughters of Unitarian ministers. This was at Waterlow Park on Highgate Hill, north London. At this time he left Stepney to found a Unitarian chapel near the school. Among other new causes due directly to his suggestion, and largely to his aid, were those at Clerkenwell, Croydon, Forest Hill, Notting Hill, and Peckham; and outside London his influence was not felt among Unitarians as a stimulus to propagandist work.

He was interested in the monotheistic movement of the Brahmo Somaj of India, and was in contact with its leaders from the visit (1870) to Britain of Keshub Chunder Sen, who was his guest. On his initiative was founded (7 June 1881) the Christian Conference, brought together representatives of all denominations, from Cardinal Manning to James Martineau. He had travelled in France, Italy, and America, and kept up a correspondence with liberal thinkers in all parts of the world. He died at his residence, Arundel House, Highgate, of cancer, on 25 February 1899, and was buried at Nunhead cemetery on 1 March. He married, first (1846), Margaret Kirton (died 1867), by whom he had five children, of whom the youngest daughter survived him; secondly (1869), Emily Glover, who survived him with two sons and four daughters.

== Views ==
He was one of the last advocates in Unitarianism of the miraculous, but had doubts about the virgin birth.

== Works ==
Spears was with Samuel Sharpe one of the last of the Bible-fundamentalist school of Unitarians, harking back to Theophilus Lindsey and earlier. He wrote "The following are the leading articles of the religion of Christian Unitarians: They believe — Of the Holy Scriptures: "Thy word is a lamp unto my feet, and a light unto my path." Psalm cxix. 105.

He published:

- The Unitarian Handbook of scriptural illustrations & expositions, Newcastle upon Tyne, 1859?; 2nd edit. 1862; 1883; the later editions were revised by Russell Lant Carpenter.
- Record of Unitarian Worthies [1877]; the prefixed Historical Sketch was reprinted, 1895.

He prefaced Thomas Belsham's Memoirs of Lindsey (3rd edit. 1873); compiled from Joseph Priestley's works The Apostolic and Primitive Church … Unitarian (1871); and wrote the introduction and appendix to Hugh Hutton Stannus's History of the Origin of the Doctrine of the Trinity (1882). He brought out popular editions of William Ellery Channing's works, 1873, and 1884,. His Scriptural Declaration of Unitarian Principles was a widely circulated Unitarian tract.
