= John Sherman (minister) =

John Sherman (June 30, 1772 - August 2, 1828) graduated from Yale College in 1793 with honors and became the pastor of the First Congregational Church in Mansfield, Connecticut, in 1797. During the last of his eight years at Mansfield, his evolving Unitarian doctrine conflicted with the Trinitarian beliefs of his congregation and efforts were made to dispel him.

About 1803, Sherman became pastor of the Unitarian church at Trenton, New York, which was organized in 1803.

In 1805, Sherman first viewed Trenton Falls during a visit from Connecticut. In 1806, Sherman moved to Trenton to be the pastor of the Reformed Christian Church, the first Unitarian Church in the state of New York. Sherman resigned as pastor in 1810 and established a teaching academy next to the low ground trail to Trenton Falls. In 1808, with the help of money donated by Joseph Bonaparte, Napoleon's brother, a path was blasted to Trenton Falls.

In 1812, Sherman founded an academy in the village, which he successfully conducted a number of years and educated a large number of scholars. He was a finely educated man, an eloquent preacher and a writer of ability. He was enraptured over the falls and their surroundings, and believed from the first that the locality would eventually become a popular resort.

In 1822, Sherman and partner Jarvis Phelps purchased 60 acres (240,000 m^{2}) from the Holland Land Company (including Sherman Falls). Sherman bought out his partner in 1823, and built the Rural Resort, which opened to visitors that summer. In 1825, Sherman expanded the Rural Resort to accommodate overnight guests. Trenton Falls became a “must see” destination between the East Coast and Niagara Falls.

In 1827, visitor Michael Moore severely injured his leg during a fall in the gorge; Sherman's daughter Maria nursed Moore back to health. In 1831, Moore married Maria Sherman and assumed management of the resort. In 1851, the Trenton Falls Hotel – known by the popular name Moore's Hotel – was constructed, leading to a dramatic rise in tourism.

Sherman was the grandson of the American founding father Roger Sherman.
