= Richard Wright (Unitarian) =

English Unitarian minister

Richard Wright (7 February 1764 – 16 September 1836) was an English Unitarian minister, and the itinerant missionary of the Unitarian Fund, a missionary society established in 1806.

== Life ==
The eldest son of Richard Wright, he was born at Blakeney, Norfolk, on 7 February 1764. His father was a labourer; his mother, Anne (d. 11 October 1810), claimed cousinship with Sir John Fenn. A relative (who died in 1776) sent him to school, and would have done more had his parents not become dissenters. He served as page, and was apprenticed to a shopkeeper, joined (1780) the independent church at Guestwick under John Sykes (d. 1824), and began village preaching on week nights; for which he was excommunicated. The Wesleyans allowed Wright to preach, but he did not join them.

For a short time he ministered to a newly formed General Baptist congregation at Norwich. Here he made the acquaintance of Samuel Fisher, who had been dismissed on a moral charge from the ministry of St. Mary's Particular Baptist church, Norwich, and had joined the Sabellian Particular Baptists, founded by John Johnson. Fisher ministered for periods of six months alternately at a chapel in Deadman's Lane, Wisbech, Cambridgeshire, and a chapel erected (1778) by his friends in Pottergate Street, Norwich: Wright was engaged to alternate with Fisher at both places. Shortly the arrangement was broken, and Wright gave his whole time to Wisbech.

His views rapidly changed; he brought his congregation with him from Calvinism to unitarianism. Some time after they had been disowned by the Johnsonian Baptists, he gained their admission to the General Baptist assembly. His influence extended to the General Baptist congregation at Lutton, Lincolnshire, which had become universalist (1790). This introduced him (1797) to William Vidler, to whose periodical, the Universalist's Miscellany, he contributed (in the last half of 1797) a series of letters (reprinted Edinburgh, 1797). Vidler and he exchanged visits, and he made Vidler a unitarian (by 1802). At this time Wright wrote much on universalism.

Wright began to travel as a missionary, and in 1806 the Unitarian Fund was established in London, with Wright as the first travelling missionary. His journeys were mostly on foot; his effectiveness was greater in private than as a preacher. In 1810 he resigned his charge at Wisbech, to devote himself entirely to itinerant work. His travels took him through most parts of England and Wales, and in Scotland as far as Aberdeen. In 1819 the Unitarian Fund brought him to London to superintend the organisation of local preachers.

He became (September 1822) minister of a Baptist congregation at Trowbridge, Wiltshire, which he brought into the General Baptist assembly. In 1827 he moved to the charge of a small congregation at Kirkstead, Lincolnshire, where John Taylor had once preached. Here he died on 16 September 1836; a tablet to his memory was set up in Kirkstead chapel.

== Views ==
Wright was a Biblical fundamentalist in his teaching, following the model of John Biddle. He also acknowledged his legacy to Fausto Sozzini (i.e. Socinianism). In his discussions and missionary visits around northern England he continually challenged other Christians to address the question of whether Christ wholly died on the cross: "to his real person, whatever natures might constitute that person, did the real person who is called Christ actually die?". He taught against the pre-existence of Christ and followed the views of Joseph Priestley and Thomas Belsham in rejecting the virgin birth of Jesus.

== Works ==
- An essay on the miraculous conception of Jesus Christ, 1808
- A Plain View of the Unitarian Christian Doctrine, in a Series of Essays on the One God, the Father, and the Mediator between God and Men, the Man Christ Jesus, 1815

His publications also include:

- 'An Abridgment of Five Discourses ... Universal Restoration,’ Wisbech, 1798.
- 'The Anti-Satisfactionist,’ Wisbech, 1805, (against the doctrine of atonement).
- 'An Apology for Dr. Michael Servetus,’ Wisbech, 1806.
- 'An Essay on the Existence of the Devil,’ 1810.
- 'Essay on the Universal Restoration,’ 1816.
- 'Essay on a Future Life,’ Liverpool, 1819.
- 'The Resurrection of the Dead,’ Liverpool, 1820.
- 'Christ Crucified,’ Liverpool, 1822.
- 'Review of the Missionary Life and Labours ... by Himself,’ 1824. He left another autobiography, in manuscript.

== Family ==
Wright's first wife died on 6 June 1828. He left a widow and three daughters. His brother, F. B. Wright (Francis Browne Wright, b. 29 January 1769, d. 24 May 1837), was a printer and lay-preacher in Liverpool, author of 'History of Religious Persecutions' (Liverpool, 1816, 8vo), and editor of the 'Christian Reflector' (1822–7), a unitarian monthly. His brother, John Wright, lay-preacher in Liverpool, was the subject of an abortive prosecution for blasphemy in a sermon delivered on Tuesday, 1 April 1817. He emigrated to Georgetown, United States of America. Richard Wright's grandson, John Wright (1824–1900), was one of the projectors (1861) of the 'Unitarian Herald.'
