= Robert Brook Aspland =

English Unitarian minister and editor

Robert Brook Aspland (19 January 1805 – 21 June 1869) was an English Unitarian minister and editor. He was distinguished from his father Robert Aspland (1782-1845).

== Life ==
Robert Brook Aspland was born in Newport, Isle of Wight on 19 January 1805. His first educational years was with Mr. Potticary of Blackheath where he met Benjamin Disraeli as a school friend. After that he moved to Tavistock where a Mr. Evans was his teacher. Glasgow University followed Tavistock where he graduated as M.A. in 1822. He finished his studies at Manchester College, York in 1826.

He started his career at Crook's Lane Chapel, Chester in August 1826. He left Crook's Lane in 1833 to be co-pastor with Lant Carpenter at Lewin's Mead chapel, Bristol. On 21 October of that same year, he married Jane Hibbert and established a boarding-school. In 1836 he moved to Dukinfield and in 1858 to Hackney. He took up the editorship of the Christian Reformer after his father's death in 1845. He stayed with the Christian Reformer till the publication ceased in 1863. In 1846 he was made secretary of Manchester College and stayed on till 1857.

Brook Aspland became secretary of the British and Foreign Unitarian Association in 1859. A colleague took care of him when he fell critically ill in 1867. He died on 21 June 1869, aged 65.

== Works ==
In 1850 he collected memoirs of his father's life from the Christian Reformer as well as A Brief Memoir of the Rev. Paul Cardale, extracted from the Christian Reformer, 1852. Various sermons were also published, including Paul Best, the Unitarian Confessor, 1853; Mr. Richard Frankland and Dr. Henry Sampson, reprinted in pamphlet form, 1862.

His papers are held at Harris Manchester College, Oxford.
