= Unitarian Universalist Christian Fellowship =

Unitarian Universalist religious organization

- The official logo of UUCF
- Abbreviation: UUCF
- Formation: 1945
- Type: Religious organization
- Purpose: To serve Unitarian Universalist Christians
- Headquarters: Oak Ridge, Tennessee
- Location: United States
- President: Jake Morrill
- Website: uuchristian.com

The Unitarian Universalist Christian Fellowship (UUCF) is the main group serving Christian Universalists and Unitarian Universalists within the Unitarian Universalist Association of the United States, whose main office is based in Oak Ridge, Tennessee. The UUCF was founded in Boston, Massachusetts in 1945, and can trace its roots back through the history of Unitarianism and Christian Universalism in British North America. As its bylaws put it:

We serve Christian Unitarians and Universalists according to their expressed religious needs; uphold and promote the Christian witness within the Unitarian Universalist Association; and uphold and promote the historic Unitarian and Universalist witness and conscience within the church universal.

They do this work by publishing quarterly (Advent/Christmas, Easter, Pentecost, and Ordinary Time) the Good News Journal, a journal of theology and spirituality for progressive and liberal Christians, and by holding a "Revival" every year, which is an opportunity for its members to gather together. Members also meet regularly at their local Unitarian Universalist congregations in UUCF-affiliated Christian spirituality covenant groups, and by engaging in sharing and discussions on the UUCF Facebook group and page and via e-mail.

== See also ==
- Revised Common Lectionary
