= British and Foreign Unitarian Association =

- Abbreviation: BFUA; the Unitarians
- Formation: 26 May 1825 as an amalgamation of the Unitarian Book Society for literature, The Unitarian Fund for mission work, and the Unitarian Association for civil rights
- Dissolved: 1928 by becoming part of the General Assembly of Unitarian and Free Christian Churches
- Type: religious organization
- Headquarters: London, United Kingdom
- Location: United Kingdom

The British and Foreign Unitarian Association was the major Unitarian body in Britain from 1825. The BFUA was founded as an amalgamation of three older societies: the Unitarian Book Society for literature (1791), The Unitarian Fund for mission work (1806), and the Unitarian Association for civil rights (1818 or 1819). Its offices were shared with the Sunday School Association at Essex Street, on the site of England's first Unitarian church. In 1928 the BFUA became part of the General Assembly of Unitarian and Free Christian Churches, still the umbrella organisation for British Unitarianism, which has its headquarters, Essex Hall, in the same place in central London.

== Dates ==
The British and Foreign Unitarian Association was founded on 26 May 1825, at a meeting chaired by Thomas Gibson, father of Thomas Field Gibson. This was the same day as the American Unitarian Association was formed. (The AUA is one of two bodies that merged in 1961 to form the Unitarian Universalist Association.) The History of Essex Hall, written in 1959 by Mortimer Rowe, the Secretary (i.e. chief executive) of the General Assembly for its first twenty years, claims this was entirely coincidental.

== Publishing ==
Under the impetus of Theophilus Lindsey, the first minister of the Essex Street Chapel, and his colleague John Disney, in 1791 the "first organized denominational Unitarian society" was formed, with the cumbersome name of The Unitarian Society for promoting Christian Knowledge and the Practice of Virtue by the Distribution of Books.

The earliest notable publication was Thomas Belsham's The New Testament in an Improved Version Upon the Basis of Archbishop Newcome's New Translation (1808), which was continued by the British and Foreign Unitarian Association. At the end of 1826 the Association acquired the Monthly Repository magazine, formerly edited by Robert Aspland. The Association contracted the French historian Gaston Bonet-Maury to write a history of French radical Protestantism.

In March 1876 Robert Spears resigned from the Association in objection to proposals to publish the works of Theodore Parker. Spears started the Christian Life as a rival magazine to the London Inquirer, becoming the voice of conservative late Biblical Unitarianism with Samuel Sharpe, till the two publications were merged in July 1929, and ran for a short time as The Inquirer and Christian Life. Another magazine, the Unitarian Herald, ran from 1861 to 1889.

== Mission work ==
The Unitarian Fund "for the Promotion of Unitarianism by means of Popular Preaching" was founded in 1806, largely by laypeople. It gave money to congregations that needed it and employed Richard Wright as an itinerant missionary. Foreign Secretaries of the Association included Sir John Bowring, till 1832, then Edward Tagart.

== Civil rights ==
It took about 150 years from the Great Ejection of 1662 to the passage of the Doctrine of the Trinity Act 1813, which granted toleration for Unitarian worship; the so-called Act of Toleration 1689 had only worked to the favour of those Protestant dissenters who accepted the Trinity. This victory for Unitarians—largely pushed forward in Parliament by William Smith, and thus known sometimes under his name, or as the Unitarian Relief Act (Trinity Act) or The Unitarian Toleration Bill—did not grant them full civil rights while the oppressive Corporation Act and Test Act remained. The Association for the Protection of the Civil Rights of Unitarians was established in 1819.

== People associated with it ==
=== Presidents and chairmen of annual meeting ===
- 1829 Thomas Gibson, father of Thomas Field Gibson (also 1844 and 1845)
- John Ashton Yates, also 1856
- 1850 Thomas Field Gibson
- 1869–70 Samuel Sharpe
- 1898-99 Herford Brook (1830–1903)
- 1918 Richard Durning Holt
- 1921 Charles Sydney Jones

=== Secretaries ===
- 1834 James Yates (1789–1871)
- 1835-1842 Robert Aspland
- 1842-1858 Edward Tagart (1804–1858)
- 1859-1868 Robert Brook Aspland, son of Robert Aspland
- 1869-1876 Robert Spears
- 1892-1921 William Copeland Bowie (1855–1936)

=== Notable members ===
- Samuel Bache

== Bibliography ==
- Rowe, Mortimer (1959), The History of Essex Hall, Lindsey Press, archived from the original on 2012-01-16
