= Samuel Sharpe (scholar) =

British scholar

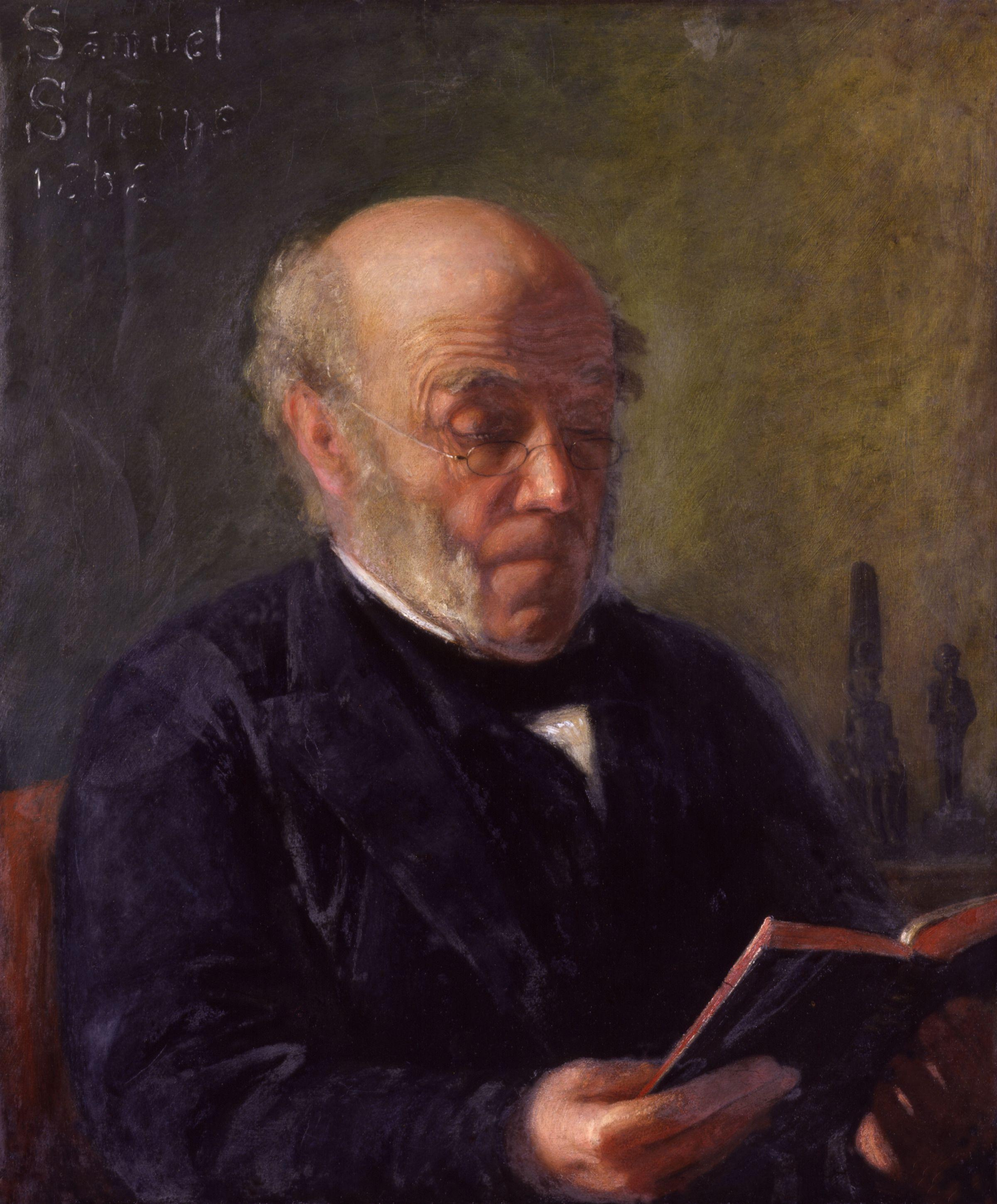
- Portrait from 1868 of Sharpe by his daughter, Matilda
- Born: 1799
- Died: 1881 (aged 81–82)
- Occupation(s): Banker, Egyptologist, biblical translator

Samuel Sharpe (1799–1881) was an English Unitarian banker who, in his leisure hours, made substantial contributions to Egyptology and Biblical translation.

== Background ==
He was the second son of Sutton Sharpe (1756–1806), a brewer, with his second wife, Maria Rogers (1771–1806), third daughter of Thomas Rogers, a banker, and was born in King Street, Golden Square, London, on 8 March 1799, and baptised at St. James's, Piccadilly. His elder brother Sutton Sharpe the younger (1797–1843) was a barrister, and friend of Stendhal and Prosper Mérimée. His younger sister Mary married legal reformer Edwin Wilkins Field. One of his younger brothers, William Sharpe (1804–1870) of Highbury, a solicitor, had daughters Maria who married Karl Pearson, Elizabeth (Bessie or Lisa) who married Henry Peyton Cobb as his second wife, and Sarah Lucy who married in 1865 Sydney Courtauld. Daniel Sharpe, another younger brother, was noted as a geologist.

Samuel Sharpe's mother Maria was sister to Samuel Rogers, a man of letters and banker. The Rogers family were wealthy Dissenters at Newington Green, then a village just north of London. They had a large house there, sold in 1797 by Samuel Rogers. Samuel and his brother Henry Rogers were partners in a bank, at 29 Clement's Lane, Lombard Street. It traded under different names down the years: Welch & Rogers in 1766, it became Welch, Rogers, Olding & Rogers in 1785. After a merger in 1811 it was known as Rogers, Towgood & Co., or Rogers, Towgood, Olding & Co. The merger was with the bank trading as Langston, Towgood, Cazalet & Co. (or Langston, Towgood, Boycott & Forester, also of Clement's Lane), and involved John Towgood (1757–1837) who married Martha Rogers, sister of Maria, Samuel and Henry Rogers. Samuel Rogers headed the new bank. Towgood was a slave owner on St Kitts.

Sutton Sharpe the elder was a needle-maker, as well as a brewer, and has been called a dilettante. Through Maria he was able to move in literary circles. He was also on good terms with artists: John Bewick, James Barry, John Flaxman, John Opie and Martin Archer Shee. He married, firstly, Catharine Purchas, who died in 1791. He remarried in 1795.

Following his father's business failure and death in 1806, Samuel Sharpe and his five siblings were orphaned. The children were then cared for by their half-sister Catharine (1782–1853), the only child of his father's first marriage. She found a house for the whole family on Stoke Newington Church Street. In summer 1807 Samuel became a boarder in the dissenting academy of Eliezer Cogan at Higham Hill, Walthamstow.

According to Anna Letitia Le Breton née Aikin, Catharine Sharpe was a family friend of the Aikins. She lived out the end of her life at the house of Arthur Aikin in Bloomsbury Square. Samuel Sharpe knew Anna Letitia Barbauld née Aikin, whom his sister visited, and also was on good terms with the family of John Aikin.

== Career and interests ==
At Christmas 1814 Sharpe was taken into the family bank in Cornhill, London. He remained connected with the firm till 1861, having been made partner in 1824.

For many years Sharpe and his brothers taught classes to poor children, before office hours, in the Lancasterian school, Harp Alley, Farringdon Street. He was elected a fellow of the Geological Society about 1827, but took a greater interest in mathematical science and archæological research, as his contributions (1828–31) to the Philosophical Magazine show.

Sharpe's benefactions to University College and School, London exceeded £15,000. He reminded readers in the 1830s, and again in the 1870s, that about this sum had been extorted from wealthy Dissenters to pay for Mansion House, the official residence of the Lord Mayor of London.)

== Unitarian ==
Sharpe came gradually to adopt the Unitarian views held by his mother's family. In 1821 he joined the South Place Chapel (later the South Place Ethical Society, later still Conway Hall), the congregation of William Johnson Fox in Finsbury, central London. In giving an account of five generations of his family who attended the Newington Green Chapel, Sharpe mentioned that he joined the Unitarian congregation there around 1830. His work as a translator of the Bible began with a revision (1840) of the authorised version of the New Testament. His Greek text was that of J. J. Griesbach. When, in 1870, the project of the Revised Version was undertaken by the convocation of Canterbury, Sharpe was one of four Unitarian scholars invited to select a member of their body to co-operate with the New Testament company.

He was a trustee of Dr. Daniel Williams's foundations, 1853–1857, and worked to improve Dr Williams's Library; president of the British and Foreign Unitarian Association in 1869–70, and president of Manchester New College, London (now Harris Manchester College Oxford) from 1876 to 1878.

== Death ==
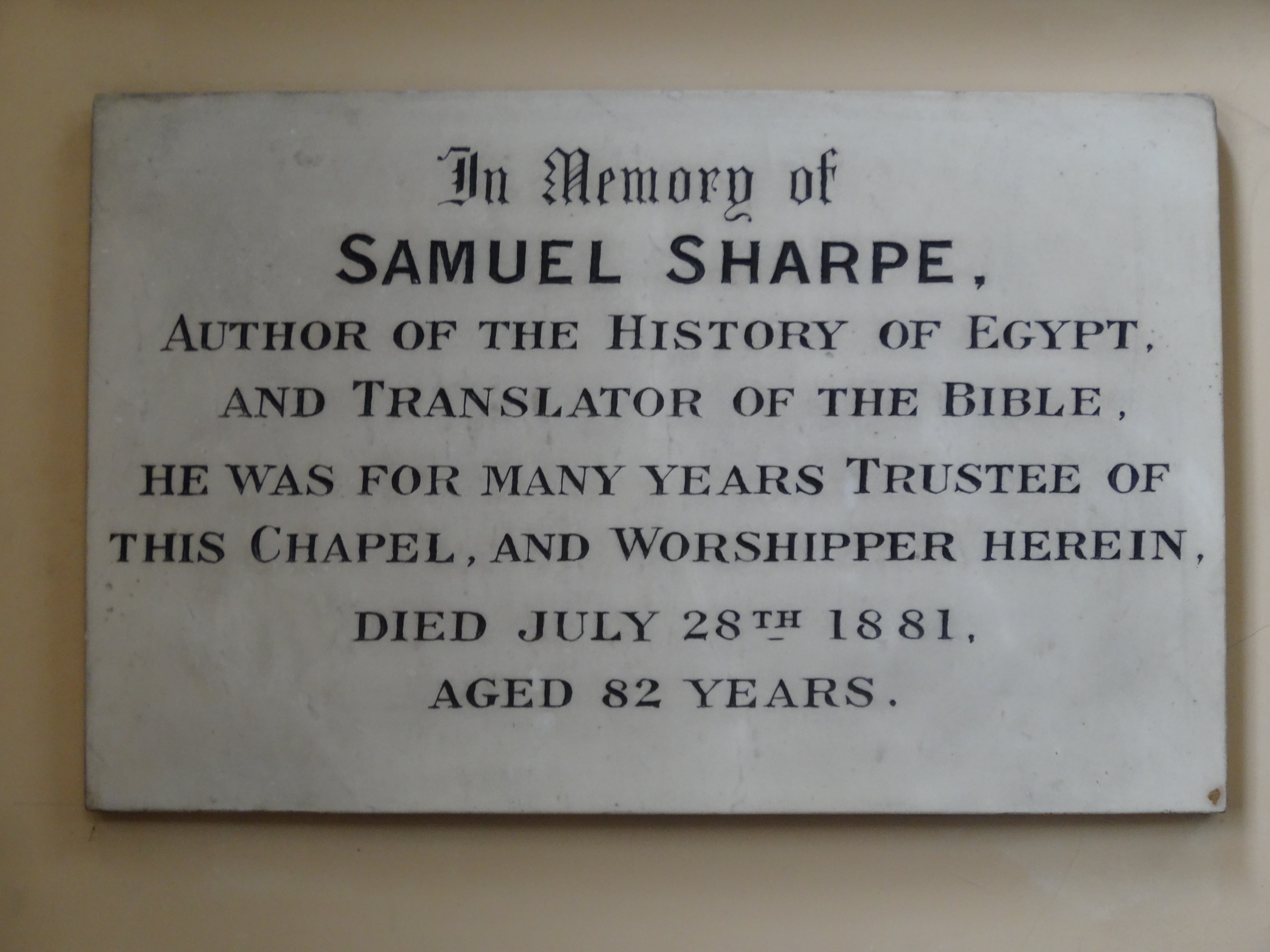
Plaque to Sharpe in Newington Green Unitarian Church

Sharpe died at 32 Highbury Place on 28 July 1881, and was buried at Abney Park Cemetery on 3 August.

== Works ==
Sharpe published, besides doctrinal tracts:

- The Early History of Egypt, 1836.
- Egyptian Inscriptions, 1837; part ii., 1841; 2nd ser. 1855.
- Rudiments of a Vocabulary of Egyptian Hieroglyphics, 1837.
- The History of Egypt under the Ptolemies, 1838.
- The New Testament, translated, 1840; 8th edit. 1881.
- The History of Egypt under the Romans, 1842.
- Notes on the Hieroglyphics of Horapollo Nilous, 1845 (Syro-Egyptian Society).
- The History of Egypt from the earliest Times till A.D. 640, 1846; 6th edit. 1876, 2 vols.; in German from the 3rd edit. (1852) by Jolowicz, revised by Von Gutschmid, Leipzig, 1862, 2 vols.
- The Chronology and Geography of Ancient Egypt, 1849, with Joseph Bonomi the younger.
- Fragments of Orations in Accusation and Defence of Demosthenes … translated, 1849.
- Sketch of Assyrian History, in Bonomi's Nineveh and its Palaces, 2nd edit. 1853.
- The Triple Mummy Case of Aro-eri Ao, 1858.
- Historical Notice of the Monuments of Egypt in Owen Jones and Bonomi's Description of the Egyptian Court in the Crystal Palace, 1854.
- Historic Notes on the … Old and New Testaments, 1854; 3rd edit. 1858.
- Critical Notes on the … New Testament, 1856; 1867.
- Alexandrian Chronology, 1857.
- Some Particulars of the Life of Samuel Rogers, 1859; 1860.
- Egyptian Hieroglyphics, 1861.
- Egyptian Antiquities in the British Museum, described, 1862.
- Notes in Bonomi's Egypt, Nubia, and Ethiopia, 1862.
- Egyptian Mythology and Egyptian Christianity, 1863.
- Sketch of the Arguments for … authorship … of the Pentateuch, [1863].
- The Alabaster Sarcophagus of Oimenepthah, 1864.
- The Hebrew Scriptures, translated, 1865 3 vols.; 4th edit. 1881, in one volume with New Testament.
- The Chronology of the Bible, &c., 1868.
- Texts from the Bible explained by … Ancient Monuments, 1866; 1869, 1880 (drawings by Bonomi).
- The History of the Hebrew Nation and its Literature, 1869; 5th edit. 1892.
- The Decree of Canopus; in Hieroglyphics and Greek, with translations, 1870.
- The Rosetta Stone; in Hieroglyphics and Greek, with translations, 1871.
- Short Notes to … translation of the Hebrew Scriptures, 1874.
- Hebrew Inscriptions from the valleys between Egypt and Mount Sinai, 1875; part ii. 1876. (see Proto-Sinaitic script)
- The Journeys and Epistles of St. Paul, 1876; 3rd edit. [1880].
- The Book of Isaiah arranged chronologically in a revised translation … with … Notes, 1877.
- A Short Hebrew Grammar without Points, 1877.
- The Book of Genesis … without Points, 1879 (selections).
- An Inquiry into the Age of the Moabite Stone, &c., 1879.
- Bαρνάβα Ἐπιστολή. The Epistle of Barnabas … with a translation, 1880.

A biography Samuel Sharpe, Egyptologist and Translator of the Bible (1883) was written by Peter William Clayden, who married Ellen Sharpe in 1887, and later wrote about Rogers.

=== Egyptology ===
David Gange groups John Marshall, John Kenrick and Sharpe together, as showing "receptivity to ancient Egyptian thought that was rare in Britain before the 1870s."

Sharpe's interest in Egyptology followed the works of Thomas Young. He studied the works of Champollion and what had been published by Sir John Gardner Wilkinson, learned Coptic, and formed a hieroglyph vocabulary. The first part (1837) of Sharpe's Egyptian Inscriptions, mainly from the British Museum, contained the largest corpus of hieroglyphical writing that had yet been published, and was followed by additional series in 1841 and 1855. His Vocabulary of Hieroglyphics was published in the autumn of 1837; he admitted that his results were often tentative. His major contribution is now considered to be the publications on hieroglyphs; later scholarship has superseded his historical work. In 1838 there appeared his History of Egypt under the Ptolemies, and in 1842 his History of Egypt under the Romans; these were incorporated with his Early History of 1836 in The History of Egypt, 1846.

Sharpe played a significant role in a controversy arising in 1859 over excavations in Egypt by Joseph Hekekyan, supervised also by Leonard Horner, that had been carried out earlier in the 1850s. On the reliance for stratigraphy on a hypothesis about the rate of deposition of sediment by the River Nile, Sharpe proposed that the site must have had an embankment, upsetting the basis of calculation. He found support from Wilkinson, and others, and a ramifying discussion was referred to Charles Lyell. Lyell also found merit in Sharpe's proposal. The debate on the antiquity of man was then at its height, and the point at issue on dating Egyptian remains was therefore topical.

=== Christianity ===
His revision of the authorised version of the Old Testament was first issued in 1865. In eight editions of his New Testament, and four of his Old, he devoted care to the improvement of his work. As a translator he was concerned to remove archaisms. Among the last advocates of unpointed Hebrew, he published manuals for instruction in this system. His History of the Hebrew Nation and its Literature, 1869, and his exegetical works bear his individual stamp. He said of himself, "I am a heretic in everything, even among Unitarians".

For the Unitarian weekly, The Inquirer, founded in 1842 by Edward Hill, he wrote for some years, though he thought newspaper writing "a bad employment." He resumed in 1876 when the Christian Life was started by his friend Robert Spears, writing a weekly article till his death. He had contributed papers, chiefly biblical, to the Christian Reformer (1834–63) with the signature 'S. S.,' and to many other periodicals.

== Family ==
In 1827 Sharpe married his first cousin Sarah (born 1796, died 3 June 1851), daughter of Joseph Sharpe, and had six children, of whom two daughters survived him. The girls are described as offering "efficient help" in his studies, for example by tracing Egyptian hieroglyphs, and with their assistance he was able to make available "by far the largest collection of hieroglyphical inscriptions ever yet published".

When Samuel Rogers died in 1855, he left his literary copyrights to Sharpe. Alexander Dyce published Recollections of the Table-Talk of Samuel Rogers (1856), which encountered heavy criticism, particularly from family members. Sharpe took the line that Dyce had acted in good faith, and did what he could to reassure Dyce.

In 1885 Matilda Sharpe and Emily Sharpe endowed the Channing School for Girls, primarily for the daughters of Unitarian ministers, and named after William Ellery Channing. They had cut their teeth, from ages 11 and 13, teaching at the Sunday School he established at Newington Green.
