= George Harris (Unitarian) =

British Unitarian minister (1794–1859)

George Harris (15 May 1794 – 24 December 1859) was a British Unitarian minister, polemicist and editor.

== Life ==
Born at Maidstone in Kent on 15 May 1794, he was son of Abraham Harris, Unitarian minister at Swansea for 40 years. George was at the age of fourteen placed in a Manchester warehouse in Cheapside, London, but, wishing to enter the Unitarian ministry, he gave up his place. In his eighteenth year he entered the Islington Academy, then under John Evans. In November 1812 he matriculated at Glasgow University, on a bursary from Dr Daniel Williams's trust, and attended classes in Glasgow during three winter sessions. His studies were interrupted by engagements as a preacher and lecturer.

The Scottish Unitarian Association was formed in July 1813. Harris was one of its originators, and was for three years its secretary. He also spent time in establishing Unitarian churches, principally in Paisley, Greenock, and neighbouring towns, and in directing Unitarian stations in different parts of Scotland. In 1816 he issued A Statement of the Principles of Unitarian Christianity addressed to the Inhabitants of Greenock and Port Glasgow, and to the Friends of Free Inquiry throughout Scotland, by a Unitarian, a concise manual of Unitarian teaching. By his efforts a Unitarian chapel was erected in Port Glasgow. It was opened by him in January 1822; the sermon which he preached on the occasion was published. At this period he also published Select Pieces for Reading and Recitation.

In April 1817, Harris was invited to become minister of Renshaw Street Unitarian Chapel in Liverpool, then vacant by the resignation of Robert Lewin. He was inducted in July, and his convictions soon engaged him in numerous controversies. Many censured his severe attacks on evangelical doctrine. His pamphlet, Unitarianism, the only Religion which can become Universal, and a course of Sunday evening lectures, published as Unitarianism and Trinitarianism contrasted, called forth replies. Dr. James Barr of Oldham Street Presbyterian Church, Dr. John Stewart of Mount Pleasant Secession Church, and Mr. Jones of St. Andrew's Church were his most prominent opponents. In 1818 Harris planned a Unitarian Christian Association for the dissemination of unitarian literature, and he travelled through Lancashire and Cheshire to gain for it sympathy and support.

In the summer of 1821 a division occurred in the Bank Street Unitarian congregation, Bolton, and in 1822 Harris accepted an invitation to become minister of the seceders. They first met at the Cloth Hall, but in 1823 the Moor Lane Church was purchased from the Scottish presbyterians. Harris was known in Manchester as ‘the intrepid champion of Socinianism.’ In 1822 he published The Lancashire and Cheshire Unitarian Association, and the Christian Reflector vindicated; in 1823 he published an account of the formation of the Moor Lane congregation, some statements in which provoked replies from other clergymen; and in 1824 appeared Christianity defended. In 1824 a speech by him in Manchester led to a long correspondence, which was afterwards published under the title of The Manchester Socinian Controversy, and indirectly caused the Hewley lawsuit.

In September 1825 Harris resigned his charge in Bolton, and moved to Glasgow, his wife's native place. He preferred the call to Glasgow to one from London, ‘because,’ he said, 'he wished to stand in the front of the battle.' The evangelical revival led by Thomas Chalmers was then at its height, but Harris attracted large audiences.

In 1841 Harris moved to Edinburgh to assist in reviving the Unitarian congregation. He stayed four years, though with less success than in Glasgow, and in 1845 he accepted an invitation to become the minister of Hanover Square Chapel, Newcastle-upon-Tyne. A new church was erected in 1854, and a large congregation gathered. He died on 24 December 1859.

== Works and views ==
Harris was constantly writing, lecturing, or preaching, and advocating Sunday schools, benevolence funds, tract and book societies, and institutions for mutual improvement. He threw himself into political and sanitary, educational, and moral movements. He was a keen radical, active for the repeal of the corn laws, on behalf of which he drew up the first petition sent from Scotland. After the Rathcormac massacre during the Tithe War in Ireland (18 December 1834), he denounced church establishments. In Scotland he was called ‘the devil's chaplain,’ to which it was replied: ‘The Prince of Darkness must be a gentleman if his chaplains are like George Harris.’

His other publications included:

- The Great Business of Life, 1847.
- Christian Unitarianism New Testament Christianity, 1848.
- The Doctrine of the Trinity, 1853.
- The Christian Character, as illustrated in the Life and Labours of the late Rev. William Turner, 1859.

For twenty-one years Harris was editor of the Christian Pilot and Pioneer.
