= Andrew Pakula =

- Born: 18 December 1957 (age 68); New York, United States
- Education: Massachusetts Institute of Technology; Andover Newton Theological School; Unitarian College, Manchester
- Occupations: Unitarian Minister; Executive Committee Member of GAUFCC

Andrew Pakula (born 18 December 1957 in New York, United States) is an atheist Unitarian minister. He was elected in 2009 to serve on the executive committee of the General Assembly of Unitarian and Free Christian Churches, the umbrella body for British Unitarians. He is the minister of two neighbouring congregations in north London: Unity, on Upper Street in the heart of Islington; and Newington Green Unitarian Church, on the village green of that name about two kilometres north.

== Early life and extended education ==
Pakula grew up within a secular Jewish family in New York. He holds a doctorate in biology from the Massachusetts Institute of Technology and a Master of Business Administration from the MIT Sloan School of Management, and used these in his careers in biotechnology management and then in business development. He began his studies for the Unitarian Universalist ministry at Andover Newton Theological School, when he was living in Boston, Massachusetts with his wife and son. He moved to England and completed these studies at Unitarian College, Manchester, whilst also serving from October 2006 as student minister at New Unity, the single name for the two congregations mentioned above. In January 2010 he was inducted as full minister of both churches; Labour Party Members of Parliament Diane Abbott and Emily Thornberry were at the service, held at Newington Green Unitarian Church.

== Career as a minister ==
Under his leadership, the church has hosted a series of annual lectures by prominent public figures, to address "a topical or important aspect of liberty, reason and ethics". These public talks, named after Pakula's internationally prominent eighteenth century predecessor Richard Price, have invited Evan Davis, the economist and BBC presenter, to speak on media and dishonesty; psychotherapist Susie Orbach, to describe "Frankenstein's Bodies Today"; and literary critic Terry Eagleton to analyse "The New Atheism and the War on Terror".

His first years at New Unity, while still officially a trainee, coincided with two important dates for the church at Newington Green, namely its tercentenary, and the 250th anniversary of the birth of Mary Wollstonecraft, probably its most famous congregant. For each of these occasions, he attached a banner to the railings outside the building (proclaiming first "300 years of dissent", and then "birthplace of feminism", in a nod to the formative years that Wollstonecraft spent worshipping there) and organised a series of celebratory or commemorative events

Pakula's sermon in honour of the Wollstonecraft anniversary stressed her role as a prophet. This excerpt serves as a flavour of the emphasis he gives to social action:

Mary Wollstonecraft was a unique individual – brilliant and strong. She was one who would not be swept along in the stream of the common beliefs and understandings of her time. Hers was a keener sight – a vision that saw beyond what most people take for granted. She saw, contrary to the assumptions of her time, that women were the equals of men. Her bold stance – a position that proved to be many years ahead of her time – was met with broad condemnation. Today, we recognise that Mary Wollstonecraft spoke with the voice of prophesy. We honour her for her courage and for the gifts she has given to future generations of women and men.

Pakula has expressed bold viewpoints and was described—sympathetically—in the local press as "controversial" when he did a reverse collection plate, giving his own money away to those attending a service.

He also supported the unanimous decision of church members when they voted to stop performing wedding ceremonies until the law recognised equal parity for same sex relationships. Human rights campaigner Peter Tatchell has called on the church to conduct a gay marriage in defiance of the law. Pakula and his congregation hosted a meeting in 2010 at which Tatchell gave a speech about moving the legal case forward for equalisation and fair treatment for all relationships.

== Writing and media appearances ==
Pakula has produced writings for use in services that have appeared on the Unitarian Universalist Association website. He reviewed Heresy Saved Me by Nicholas Axam in 2010. Pakula has also written for The Guardian, Humanist Life and the Islington Press. Pakula maintains his own social networking pages and displays his weekly sermons online.

As part of his outreach, Pakula appeared on the Today programme, BBC Radio 4's flagship morning show, at the request of guest editor Sir Tim Berners-Lee, inventor of the World Wide Web and a Unitarian himself. Berners-Lee had wished Pakula to present the segment within the programme known as "Thought for the Day", but the BBC hierarchy claimed this was not appropriate, since Pakula describes himself as an atheist. Instead he was allowed to deliver his message an hour earlier, as an "Alternative Thought for the Day", with a theistic Unitarian minister appearing in the actual TFTD slot. Pakula used his Boxing Day message to reflect on the underlying meaning of Christmas. In a brief discussion with Today host Mishal Husain, Pakula said, "The BBC talks about not allowing people of 'no faith' to present 'Thought for the Day', well, what does 'no faith' mean? Here I am, I'm a minister of religion, leading a congregation talking about peace and love, and I'm considered a person of no faith because I say I'm an atheist." The controversy was covered in Britain's main broadsheets such as The Guardian, The Independent and The Telegraph and as far afield as Australia.
