= John Howlett (political economist) =

English political economist and cleric

John Howlett (1731–1804) was an English political economist and cleric.

== Life ==
He was son of John Howlett of Bedworth in Warwickshire. He matriculated at St. Edmund's Hall, Oxford, on 10 November 1749, aged 18, and graduated B.A. from St. John's College, Oxford in 1755, M.A. in 1795, and B.D. in 1796. He was presented to the living of Great Dunmow, Essex, in 1771, and was also vicar of Great Badow. He died at Bath, Somerset on 29 February 1804.

== Works ==
Howlett wrote on the statistics and condition of the people, and criticised the theories and writings of Richard Price. In contradiction to Price, he maintained that enclosures resulted from the increase in population.

His works, with separately published sermons, are:

- An Examination of Dr. Price's Essay on the Population of England and Wales, 1781
- An Enquiry into the Influence which Enclosures have had upon the Population of England, 1786
- An Essay on the Population of Ireland, 1786
- Enclosures a cause of Improved Agriculture, 1787. This is a rejoinder to reviews of his previous work on enclosures.
- The Insufficiency of the causes to which the Increase of our Poor and the Poor's Rates have been generally ascribed, 1788
- At end of Wood's Account of Shrewsbury House of Industry a Correspondence with Howlett, 1795
- An Examination of Mr. Pitt's Speech in the House of Commons on 12 Feb. 1796, relative to the condition of the Poor, 1796
- Dispersion of the present gloomy apprehensions of late repeatedly suggested by the Decline of our Corn Trade, and conclusions of a directly opposite tendency established upon well-authenticated facts. To which are added Observations upon the first Report of the Committee on Waste Lands, 1798
- The Monthly Reviewers reviewed in a Letter to those Gentlemen, pointing out their Misrepresentations and fallacious Reasonings in the Account of the Pamphlet, 1798
- An Inquiry concerning the Influence of Tithes upon Agriculture, with remarks on Arthur Young, 1801

== Notes ==
Attribution

This article incorporates text from a publication now in the public domain: Lee, Sidney, ed. (1891). "Howlett, John". Dictionary of National Biography. Vol. 28. London: Smith, Elder & Co.
