= Mildmay Library =

Public library in Islington, England

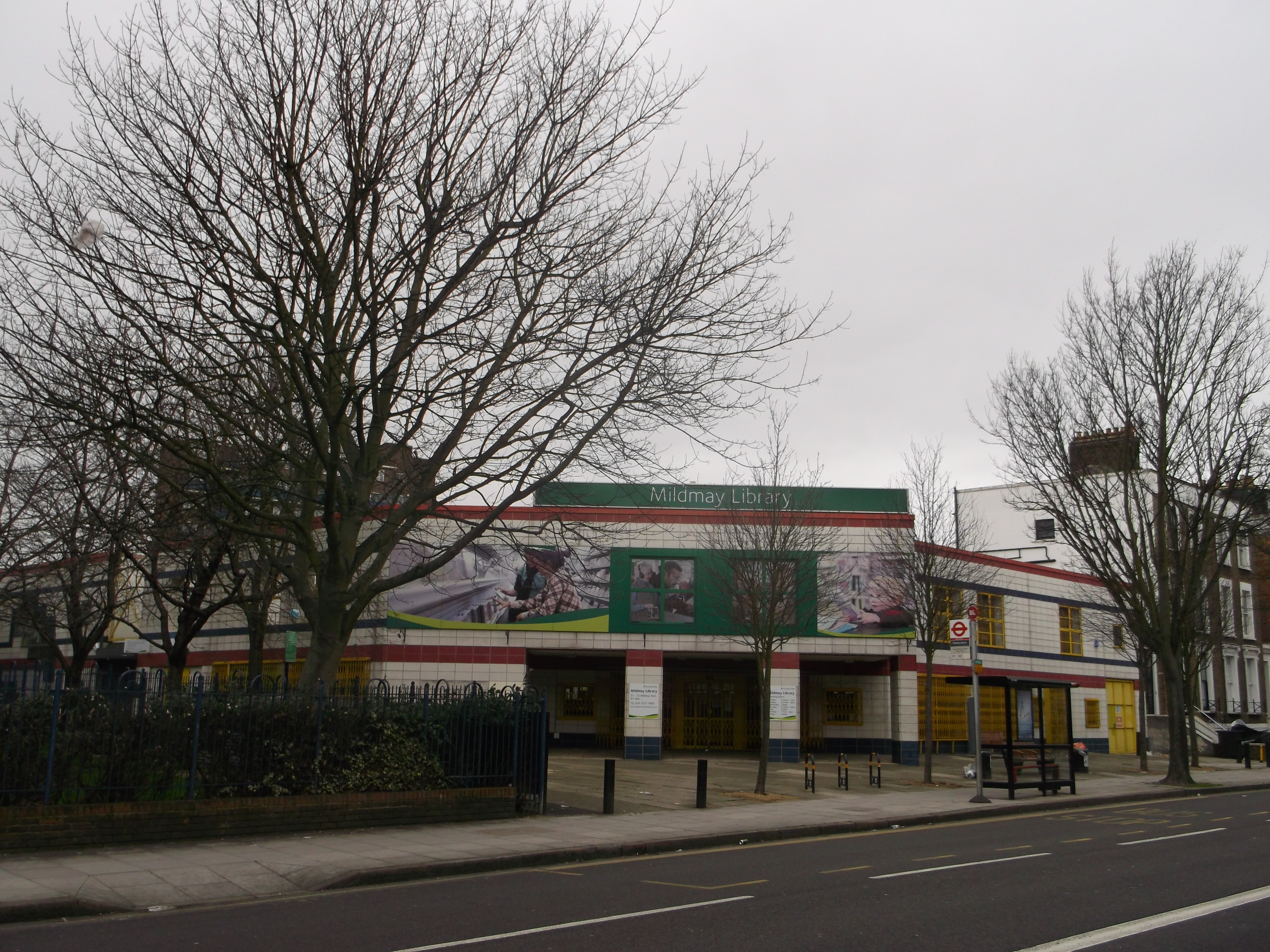
- The library in 2013
- 51.5476°N 0.0842°W
- Location: Mildmay Park; London, United Kingdom
- Type: Public library
- Established: originally: 1954 reopening: 1987
- Branch of: Islington Libraries

Collection
- Size: 15,628

Access and use
- Circulation: 29,336 (2024/25)

Other information
- Director: Maria Colucci
- Public transit access: Caledonian Road & Barnsbury; Highbury & Islington
- Website: https://www.islington.gov.uk/libraries-arts-and-heritage/libraries/your-local-libraries/mildmay-library

The Mildmay Library is a public library in the London Borough of Islington, England, mainly serving the Mildmay neighbourhood.

The library originally opened on the 3rd of April 1954. It closed in 1984, with a fully re-built library re-opening in 1987. The library was further renovated in 2024.

== History ==
The original library building was designed by Islington Borough architect and engineer C.N. Cowney. It was opened on 3 April 1954 by Wilfred Pickles.

In 1984, the library was closed, and re-opened in 1987. The new library was Islington's first computerized library, and incorporated yellow shutters to protect the new equipment. The new library was once again designed by the Borough architect, at that point Chris Purlow. The new library has been described as "jazzy and colourful," in a context of innovative borough-led architecture projects.

Following its reopening, it notably hosted an exhibition in 1989 called "Britten & Pears: A Life Together 1973-1976," retracing the last years of Benjamin Britten's life, and his personal as well as professional partnership with Peter Pears.

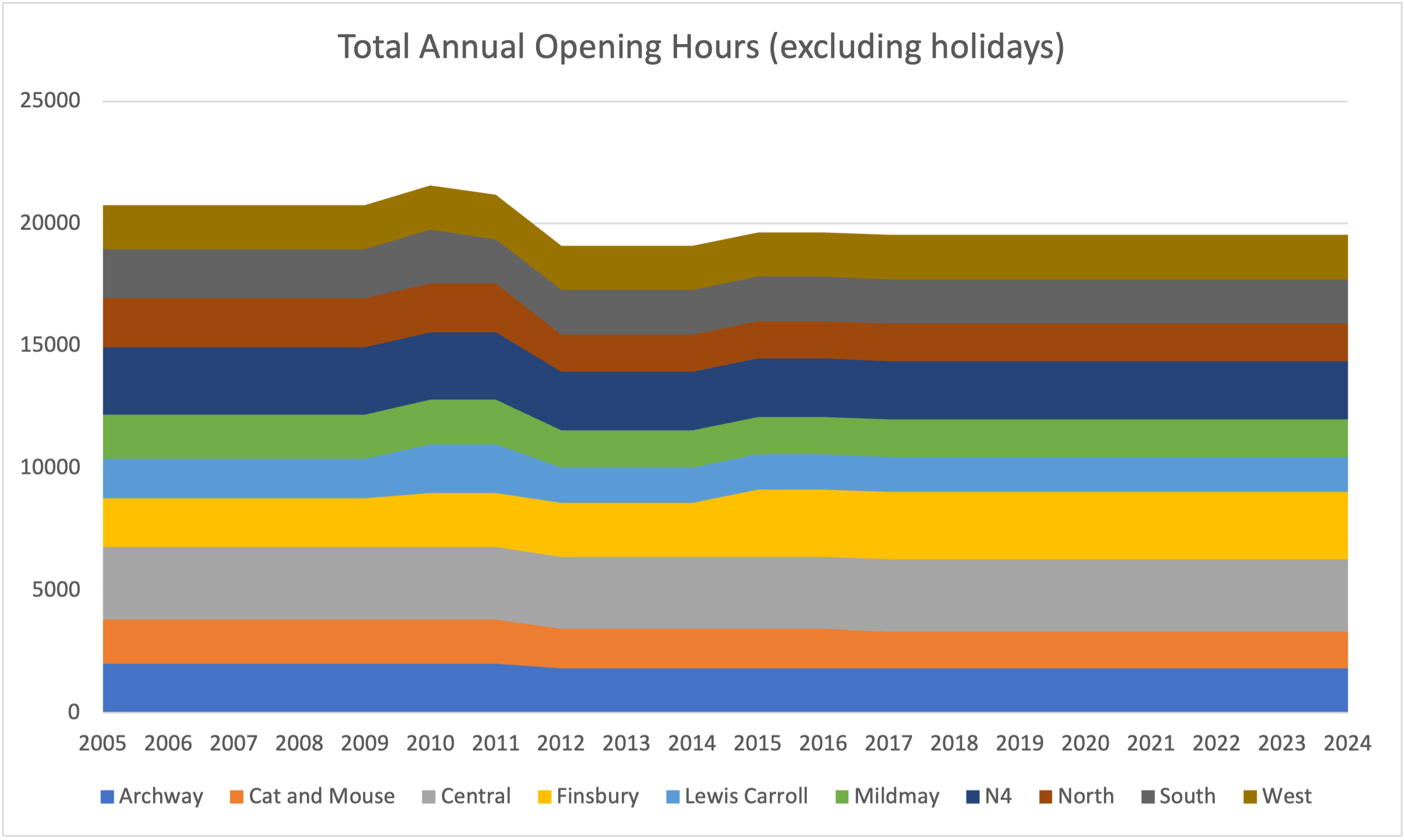
The Mildmay library saw its opening hours drop by 15% following budget cuts in 2011.

In the context of budget cuts between 2010-2014, the Mildmay was one of the libraries threatened with closure. In the end, the library was kept open, but with about 15% fewer opening hours than in 2010. In 2024, the Mildmay library was open for a total of 1,530 hours, about half the hours of the Central and Finsbury branches. The library is closed on Wednesdays, Fridays and Sundays, and only open partially on Mondays and Saturdays. During the 2021 by-election for the Mildmay ward, Green Party candidate Zoe Alzamora pledged to keep the library open seven days a week if elected.

In 2025, the Council funded renovations to the library building, including adding new signage, getting rid of the shutters, improving access, and re-sizing the children's section.

== Services ==
The library generally has relatively lower levels of engagement than the other libraries in the service. In 2024/25, the Library had 1,403 active members (9th in the service), and 39,693 visits over the year (8th in the service).

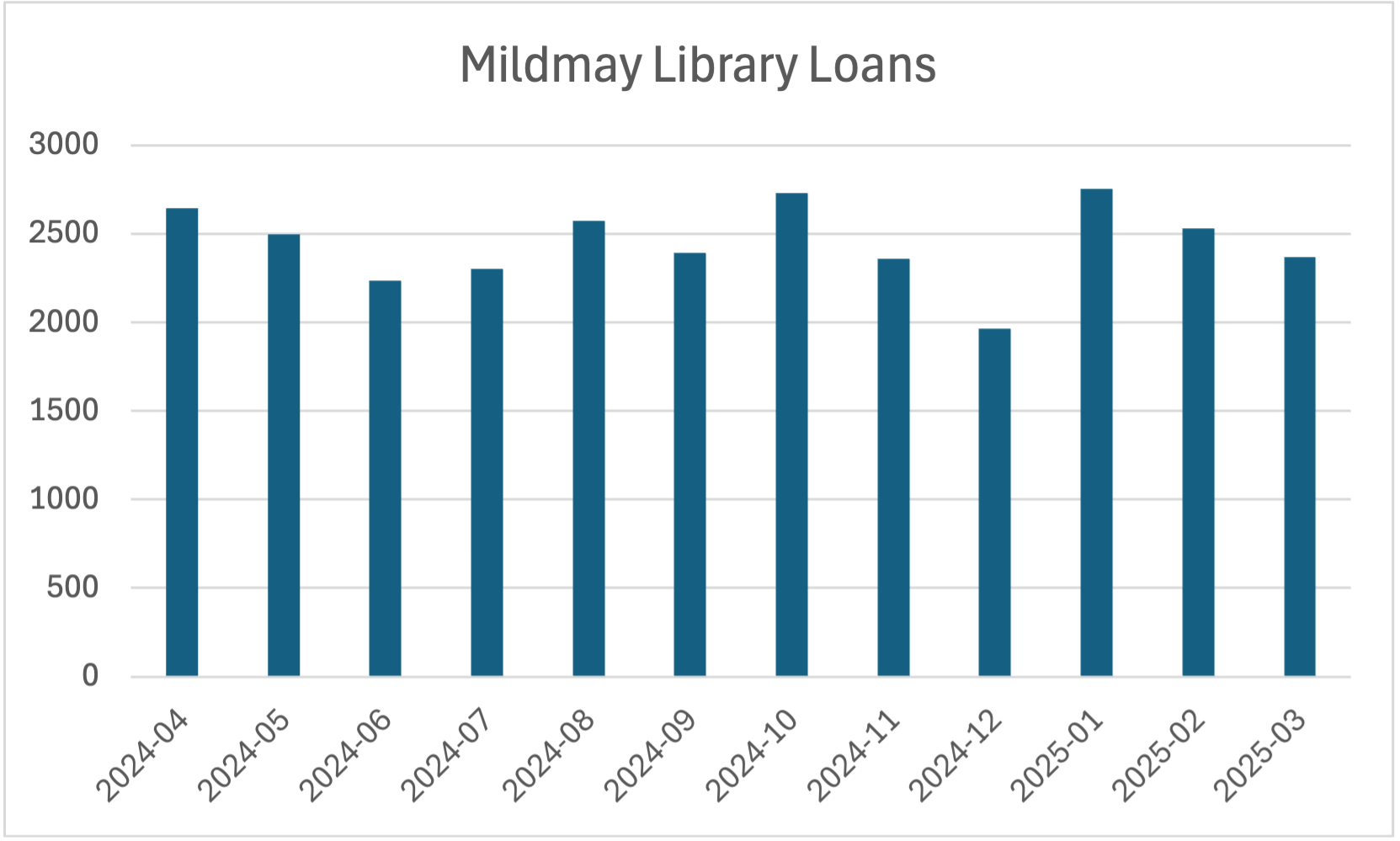
Most of the year, the library loans more than 2,000 items a month

On average, it performed 2,444 loans per month (7th in the service). The library also has a toy library, where parents can borrow toys for their children.

On top of serving as a lending library, Mildmay provides access to 9 free public computers, free wifi, printing facilities, and some study space.

The library organizes a number of events, including resettlement classes for refugees, family support sessions in partnership with Bright Futures, and counselling sessions with the Islington Bereavement service. In 2024/25, Mildmay welcomed 5,502 attendees for events – 9% of attendees to all Islington Library events.

The library is fully wheelchair accessible, and has adapted toilets.

== In popular culture ==
- The Mildmay library was one of the libraries mentioned in author Claire North's "Dear libraries" letter, where she said the library looked "pretty crummy, not gonna lie" but allowed her to "borrow [her] own weight in comics."

== See also ==
- Islington Borough Council
- Islington Libraries
