= Portrait of Dr Richard Price =

Painting by Benjamin West

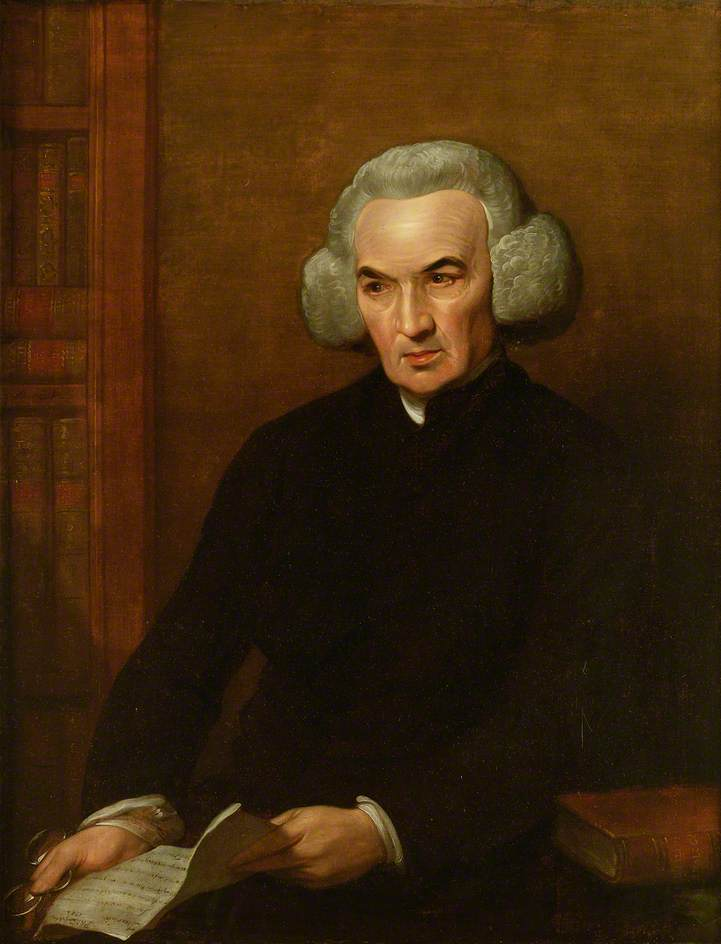
- Artist: Benjamin West
- Year: 1784
- Dimensions: 71 cm × 94 cm (28 in × 37 in)
- Location: National Library of Wales; Aberystwyth

The Portrait of Dr Richard Price, is an oil on canvas by the American painter Benjamin West from 1784.

== Description ==
The picture was sold at Christie's on 23 November 2004 and purchased by the Friends of the National Library of Wales.

The picture's dimensions are 28 x 37 inches.

== Analysis ==
Richard Price (1723–1791) was a radical and author. The portrait depicts him sitting in his office reading a letter from his friend Benjamin Franklin, dated 1784.

Price noted the sitting for this portrait in his diary, which is held today, like the picture itself, in the collection of the National Library of Wales, in Aberystwyth. This is the final portrait. Two similar images exist, perhaps studies for this picture: one held in Wales' National Museum in Cardiff, and one at the Royal Society in London.

== The artist ==
West was born in Springfield, Pennsylvania. He travelled and painted many portraits, and has been called "the American Raphael". He died at Newman Street in London, on 11 March 1820. He is buried in St Paul's Cathedral.
