= Barbara Taylor (historian) =

Canadian-born historian based in the United Kingdom

Barbara Taylor FRHistS
- Born: Barbara Gold Taylor; 11 April 1950 (age 76); Saskatoon, Saskatchewan, Canada
- Other name: Barbara G. Taylor

Academic background
- Education: University of Saskatchewan; London School of Economics; University of Sussex
- Thesis: The Feminist Theory and Practice of the Owenite Socialist Movement in Britain, 1820–45 (1980)

Academic work
- Discipline: Historian
- Institutions: University of East London; Queen Mary, University of London

Barbara Gold Taylor FRHistS (born 11 April 1950) is a Canadian-born historian based in the United Kingdom, specialising in the Enlightenment, gender studies and the history of subjectivity. She is Professor of Humanities at Queen Mary University of London.

She was born in Saskatoon, Saskatchewan. In 1971, she was awarded her first degree in political thought from the University of Saskatchewan. She then moved to London, where she gained an MSc in the same subject at the London School of Economics, followed by a PhD in history at the University of Sussex. She taught history at the University of East London from 1993 until 2012 and then moved to Queen Mary University of London, as joint professor of the schools of English & Drama and History.

She has received research grants and fellowships from the Leverhulme Trust, the Nuffield Foundation, the Guggenheim Foundation, the Social Sciences and Humanities Research Council, and the Wellcome Trust.

Taylor has written a biography of Mary Wollstonecraft, the early English feminist philosopher. She spoke about her in 2009 at Newington Green Unitarian Church as part of the 250th anniversary of Wollstonecraft's birth.

With the psychologist Adam Phillips, Taylor is the co-author of On Kindness (2009). Taylor's memoir The Last Asylum: A Memoir of Madness in Our Times, describing her years at Friern Hospital, was published in 2014. It was a finalist for the 2015 RBC Taylor Prize.

Awards
Preceded by G. E. M. de Ste. Croix	Deutscher Memorial Prize; 1983	Succeeded by Margaret A. Rose
