= Richard Price =

British philosopher, preacher and mathematician (1723–1791)

The Reverend Richard Price FRS
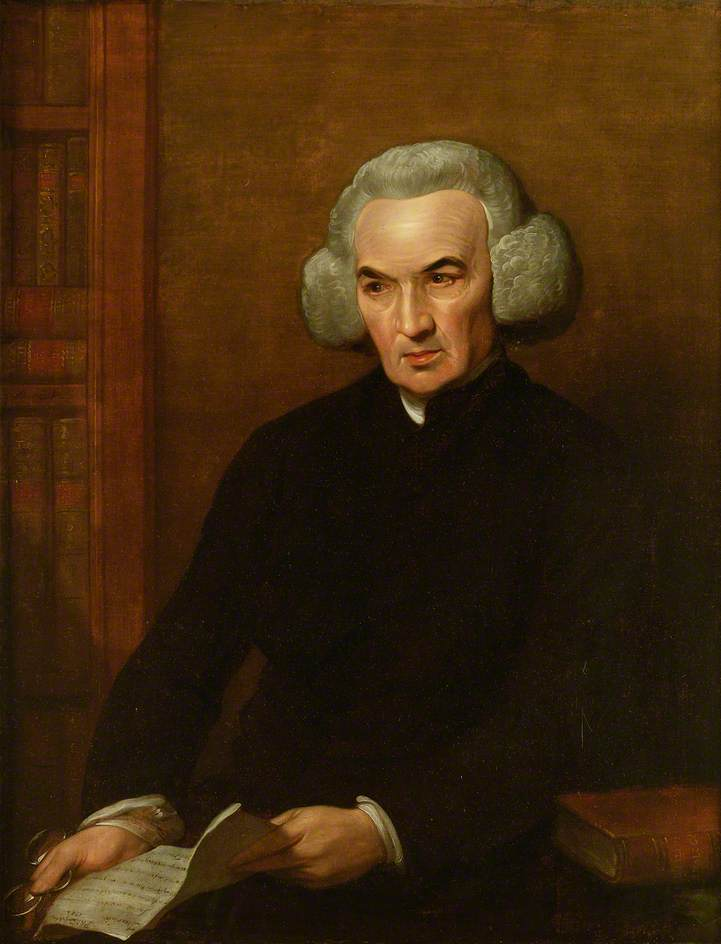
- Portrait of Dr Richard Price (1784)
- Born: 23 February 1723; Tynton, Llangeinor, Glamorgan, Wales
- Died: 19 April 1791 (aged 68); Newington Green, London, England
- Known for: Bayes–Price theorem

Richard Price (23 February 1723 – 19 April 1791) was a British moral philosopher, Nonconformist minister and mathematician. He was also a political reformer and pamphleteer, active in radical, republican, and liberal causes such as the French and American Revolutions. He was well-connected and fostered communication between many people, including Thomas Jefferson, John Adams, George Washington, Mirabeau and the Marquis de Condorcet. According to the historian John Davies, Price was "the greatest Welsh thinker of all time".

Born in Llangeinor, near Bridgend, Wales, Price spent most of his adult life as minister of Newington Green Unitarian Church, then on the outskirts of London. He edited, published and developed the Bayes–Price theorem and the field of actuarial science. He also wrote on issues of demography and finance, and was a Fellow of the Royal Society.

== Early life ==
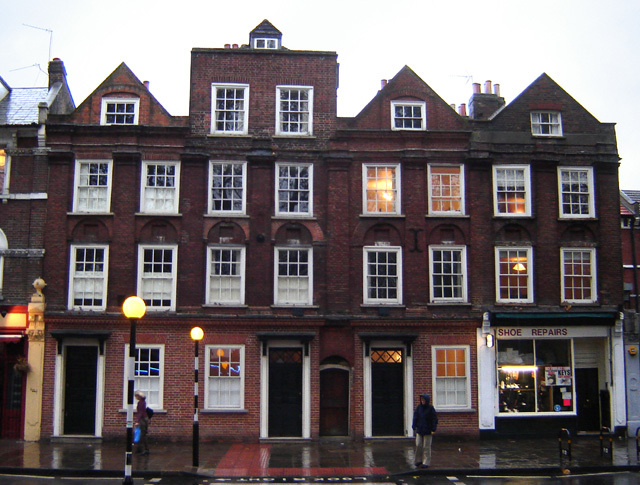
52–55 Newington Green, including the houses of Price and Rogers. This is the oldest brick terrace in London.

Born on 23 February 1723, Richard Price was the son of Rhys Price, a dissenting minister. His mother was Catherine Richards, his father's second wife. Richard was born at Tyn Ton, a farmhouse in the village of Llangeinor, Glamorgan. He was educated privately, then at Neath and Pen-twyn. He studied under Vavasor Griffiths at Chancefield, Talgarth, Powys.

He then moved to London, where he spent the rest of his life. He studied with John Eames and the dissenting academy in Moorfields, London. Leaving the academy in 1744, Price became chaplain and companion to George Streatfield at Stoke Newington, then a village just north of London. He also held the lectureship at Old Jewry, where Samuel Chandler was minister. Streatfield's death and that of an uncle in 1757 improved Price's circumstances, and on 16 June 1757 he married Sarah Blundell, originally of Belgrave in Leicestershire.

== Newington Green congregation ==
In 1758, Price moved to Newington Green, and took up residence in No. 54 the Green, in the middle of a terrace that was even then a hundred years old. (The building still survives as London's oldest brick terrace, dated 1658.) Price became minister to the Newington Green meeting-house, a church that continues today as Newington Green Unitarian Church. Among the congregation were Samuel Vaughan and his family. Price had Thomas Amory as preaching colleague from 1770.

When, in 1770, Price became morning preacher at the Gravel Pit Chapel in Hackney, he continued his afternoon sermons at Newington Green. He also accepted duties at the meeting house in Old Jewry.

== Friends and associates ==
=== Newington Green neighbours ===
A close friend of Price was Thomas Rogers, father of Samuel Rogers, a merchant turned banker who had married into a long-established Dissenting family and lived at No. 56 the Green. More than once, Price and the elder Rogers rode on horseback to Wales. Another was the Rev. James Burgh, author of The Dignity of Human Nature and Thoughts on Education, who opened his Dissenting Academy on the Green in 1750 and sent his pupils to Price's sermons. Price, Rogers, and Burgh formed a dining club, eating at each other's houses in rotation. Price and Rogers joined the Society for Constitutional Information.

=== Bowood circle ===
The "Bowood circle" was a group of liberal intellectuals around Lord Shelburne, and named after Bowood House, his seat in Wiltshire. Price met Shelburne in or shortly after 1767, or was introduced by his wife Elizabeth Montagu, a leader of the Blue Stocking intellectual women, after the publication of his Four Dissertations in that year.

In 1771, Price had Shelburne employ Thomas Jervis. Another member of the circle was Benjamin Vaughan. In 1772, Price recruited Joseph Priestley, who came to work for Shelburne as librarian from 1773.

=== "Club of Honest Whigs" ===
The group that Benjamin Franklin christened the "Club of Honest Whigs" was an informal dining group around John Canton. It met originally in St Paul's Churchyard, at the London Coffee House; in 1771 it moved to Ludgate Hill. Price and Sir John Pringle were members, as were Priestley and Benjamin Vaughan.

=== Visitors ===
Price was visited by Franklin, Thomas Jefferson, and Thomas Paine; other American politicians such as John Adams, who later became the second president of the United States, and his wife Abigail; and British politicians such as Lord Lyttleton, Lord Stanhope (known as "Citizen Stanhope"), and William Pitt the Elder. He knew also the philosophers David Hume and Adam Smith. Among activists, the prison reformer John Howard counted Price as a close friend; also there were John Horne Tooke, and John and Ann Jebb.

=== Theologians ===
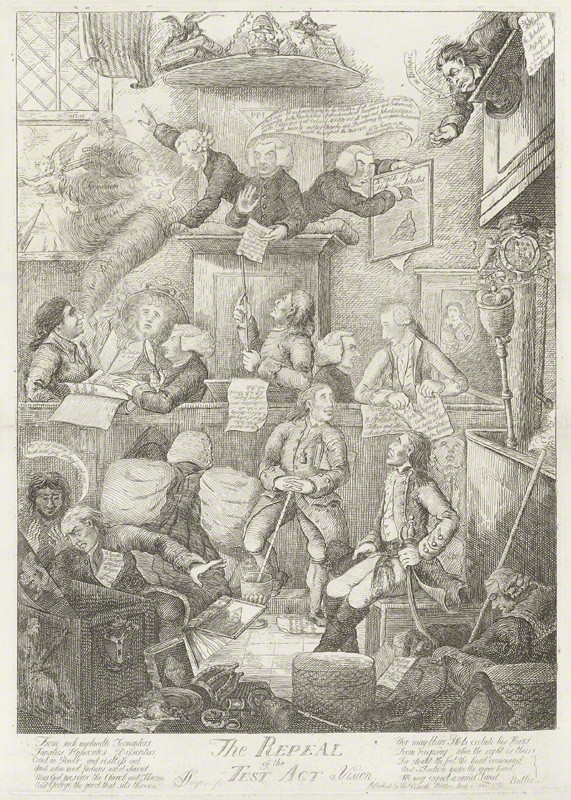
Joseph Priestley, Richard Price and Theophilus Lindsay in the pulpit, in a 1790 engraving satirising the campaign to have the Test Act repealed.

Others acknowledged their debt to Price, such as the Unitarian theologians William Ellery Channing and Theophilus Lindsey. When Lindsey resigned his living and moved to London to create an avowedly Unitarian congregation Price played a role in finding and securing the premises for what became Essex Street Chapel. At the end of the 1770s Price and Lindsey were concerned about the contraction of dissent, at least in the London area. With Andrew Kippis and others, they established the Society for Promoting Knowledge of the Scriptures in 1783.

Price and Priestley took diverging views on morals and metaphysics. In 1778 appeared a published correspondence, A Free Discussion on the Doctrines of Materialism and Philosophical Necessity. Price maintained, in opposition to Priestley, the free agency of man and the unity and immateriality of the human soul. Price's opinions were Arian, Priestley's were Socinian.

=== Mary Wollstonecraft ===
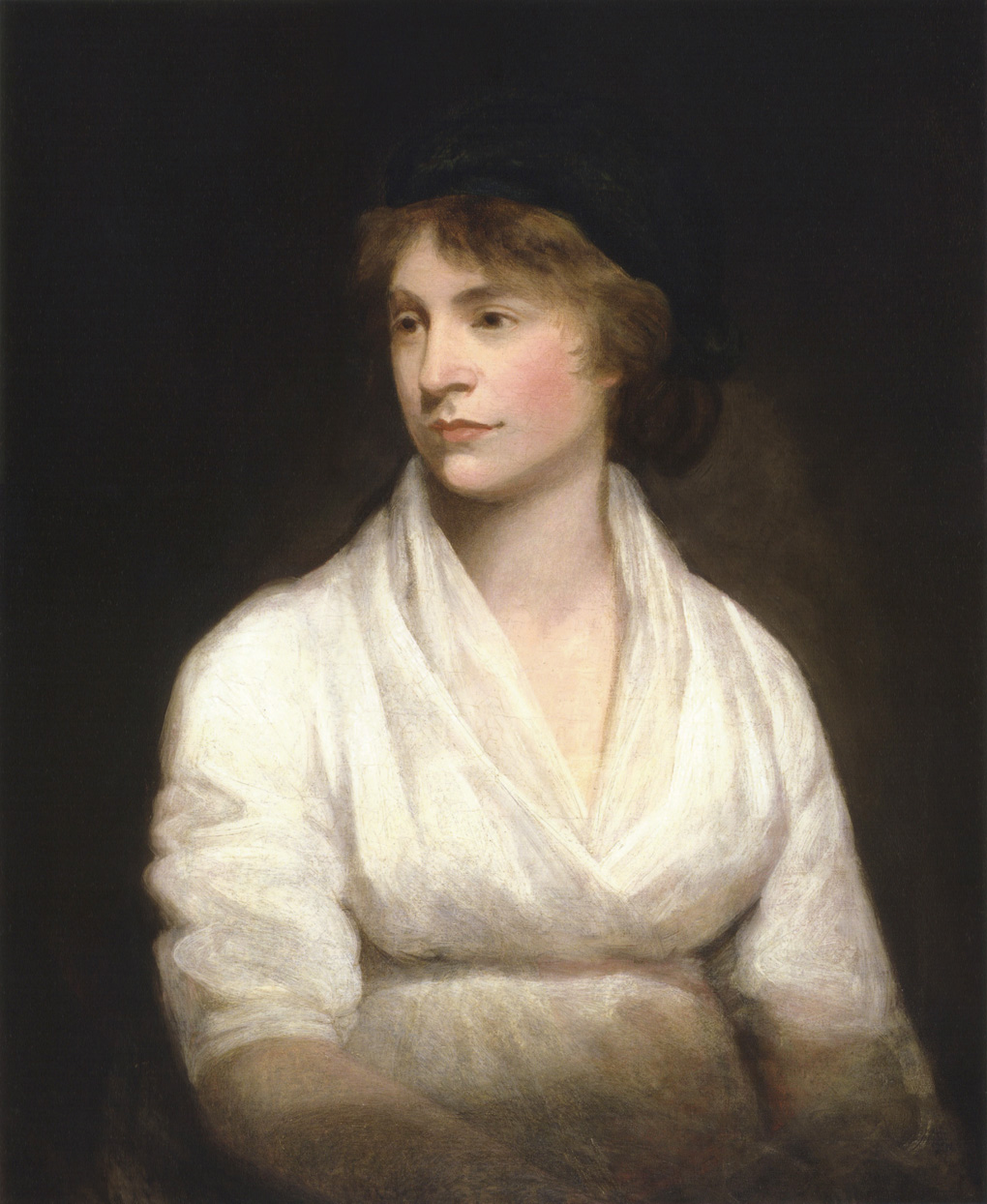
Mary Wollstonecraft (c. 1797)

Mary Wollstonecraft moved her fledgling school for girls from Islington to Newington Green in 1784, with patron Mrs Burgh, widow of Price's friend James Burgh. Wollstonecraft, originally an Anglican, attended Price's services, where believers of all kinds were welcomed. The Rational Dissenters appealed to Wollstonecraft: they were hard-working, humane, critical but uncynical, and respectful towards women, and proved kinder to her than her own family. Price is believed to have helped her with money to go to Lisbon, Spain, to see her close friend Fanny Blood.

Wollstonecraft was then unpublished: through Price she met the radical publisher Joseph Johnson. The ideas Wollstonecraft ingested from the sermons at Newington Green pushed her towards a political awakening. She later published A Vindication of the Rights of Men (1790), a response to Burke's denunciation of the French Revolution and attack on Price; and A Vindication of the Rights of Woman (1792), extending Price's arguments about equality to women: Tomalin argues that just as the Dissenters were "excluded as a class from education and civil rights by a lazy-minded majority", so too were women, and the "character defects of both groups" could be attributed to this discrimination. Price appears 14 times in the diary of William Godwin, Wollstonecraft's later husband.

== American Revolution ==
The support Price gave to the colonies of British North America in the American War of Independence made him famous. In early 1776, he published the pamphlet Observations on the Nature of Civil Liberty, the Principles of Government, and the Justice and Policy of the War with America. Sixty thousand copies of this pamphlet were sold within days; and a cheap edition was issued which sold twice as many copies. It commended Shelburne's proposals for the colonies, and attacked the Declaratory Act. Among its critics were Adam Ferguson, William Markham, John Wesley, and Edmund Burke; and Price rapidly became one of the best known men in England. He was presented with the freedom of the city of London, and it is said that his pamphlet had a part in determining the Americans to declare their independence. A second pamphlet, Additional observations on the nature and value of civil liberty, and the war with America, followed. Price was a consistent critic of war in general and the corrupting effects of growing government debt.

Price's name became identified with the cause of American independence. Franklin was a close friend; Price corresponded with Turgot; and in the winter of 1778 Price was invited by the Continental Congress to go to America and assist in the financial administration of the states, an offer he turned down. In 1781 he, solely with George Washington, received the degree of Doctor of Laws from Yale College. He preached to crowded congregations, and, when Lord Shelburne became Prime Minister in 1782, he was offered the post of his private secretary. The same year he was elected a Foreign Honorary Member of the American Academy of Arts and Sciences. In 1785, Price was elected an international member of the American Philosophical Society.

Price wrote also Observations on the importance of the American Revolution and the means of rendering it a benefit to the World (1784). In it, Price denounced the "cruel, wicked and diabolical" slave trade while highlighting the contradictions in Thomas Jefferson's Declaration of Independence, stating, "if there are any men whom they have a right to hold in slavery, there may be others who have a right to hold them in slavery." Observations on the Importance was well received by Americans. It suggested that the greatest problem facing Congress was its lack of central powers.

== French Revolution controversy ==
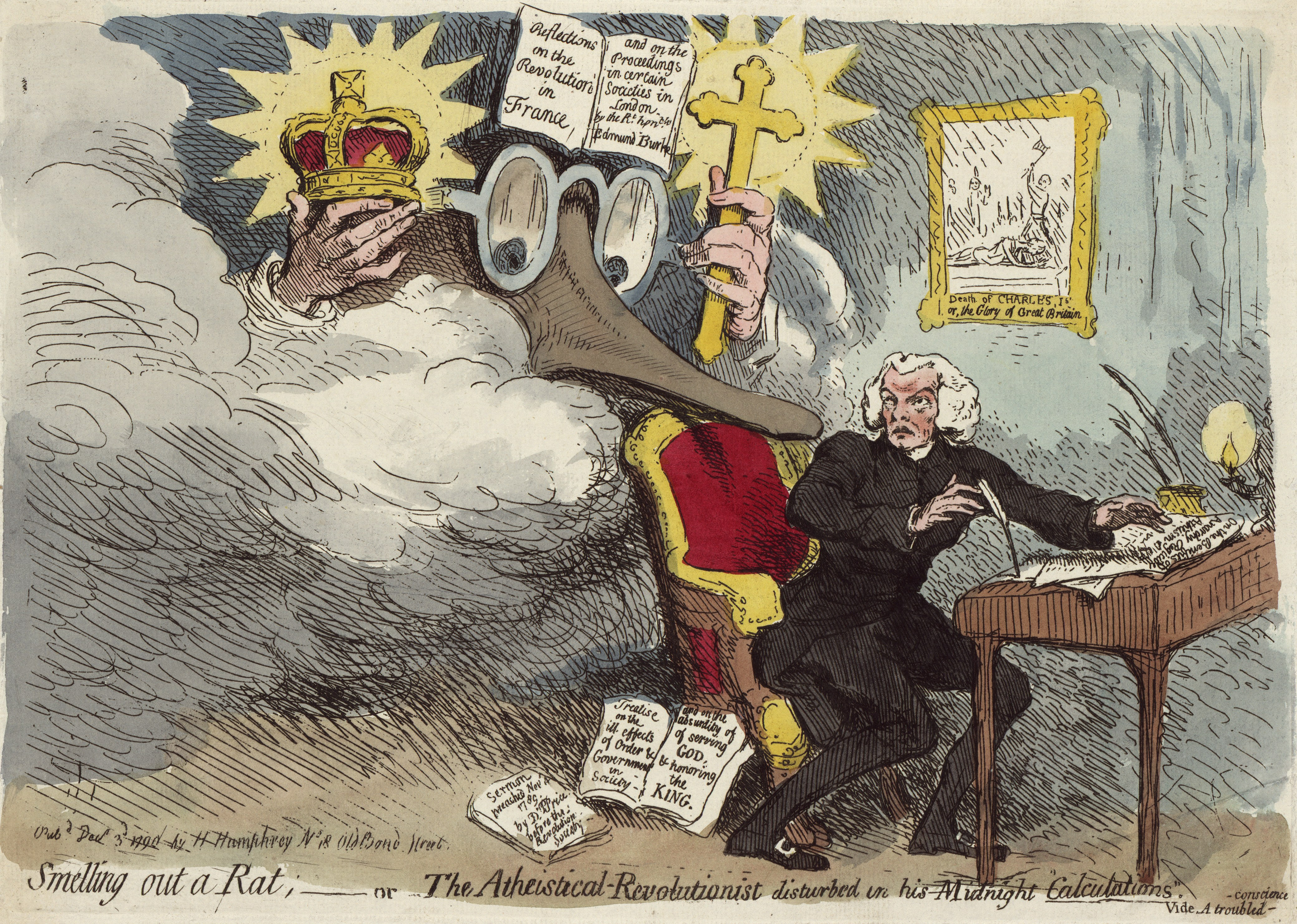
Smelling out a Rat, a caricature of Price with Edmund Burke's vision looking over his shoulder, by James Gillray, 1790.

Both Price and Priestley, who were millennialists, saw the French Revolution of 1789 as fulfilment of prophecy. On the 101st anniversary of the Glorious Revolution, 4 November 1789, Price preached a sermon entitled A Discourse on the Love of Our Country, and ignited the pamphlet war known as the Revolution Controversy, on the political issues raised by the French Revolution. Price drew a bold parallel between the Glorious Revolution of 1688 (the one celebrated by the London Revolution Society dinner) and the French Revolution of 1789, arguing that the former had spread enlightened ideas and paved the way for the second one. Price exhorted the public to divest themselves of national prejudices and embrace "universal benevolence", a concept of cosmopolitanism that entailed support for the French Revolution and the progress of "enlightened" ideas. It has been called "one of the great political debates in British history". At the dinner of the London Revolution Society that followed, Price also suggested that the Society should send an address to the National Assembly in Paris. This was the start of a correspondence with many Jacobin clubs in Paris and elsewhere in France. Though the London Revolution Society and the Jacobin clubs agreed on basic tenets, their correspondence displayed a sense of growing misunderstanding as the French Jacobins grew more radical and their British correspondents, including Price, were not prepared to condone political violence. The Society's Committee of Correspondence, which included Michael Dodson, took up the contact that was made with French Jacobins, though Price himself withdrew. At the same time, the Revolution Society joined with the Society for Constitutional Information in December 1789, at Price's insistence, in condemning the Test Act and Corporation Act as defacing the British polity, with their restrictions on Dissenters.

Burke's rebuttal in Reflections on the Revolution in France (1790) attacked Price, whose friends Paine and Wollstonecraft leapt into the fray to defend their mentor; William Coxe was another opponent, disagreeing with Price on interpretation of "our country". In 1792 Christopher Wyvill published Defence of Dr. Price and the Reformers of England, a plea for reform and moderation.

== Later life ==
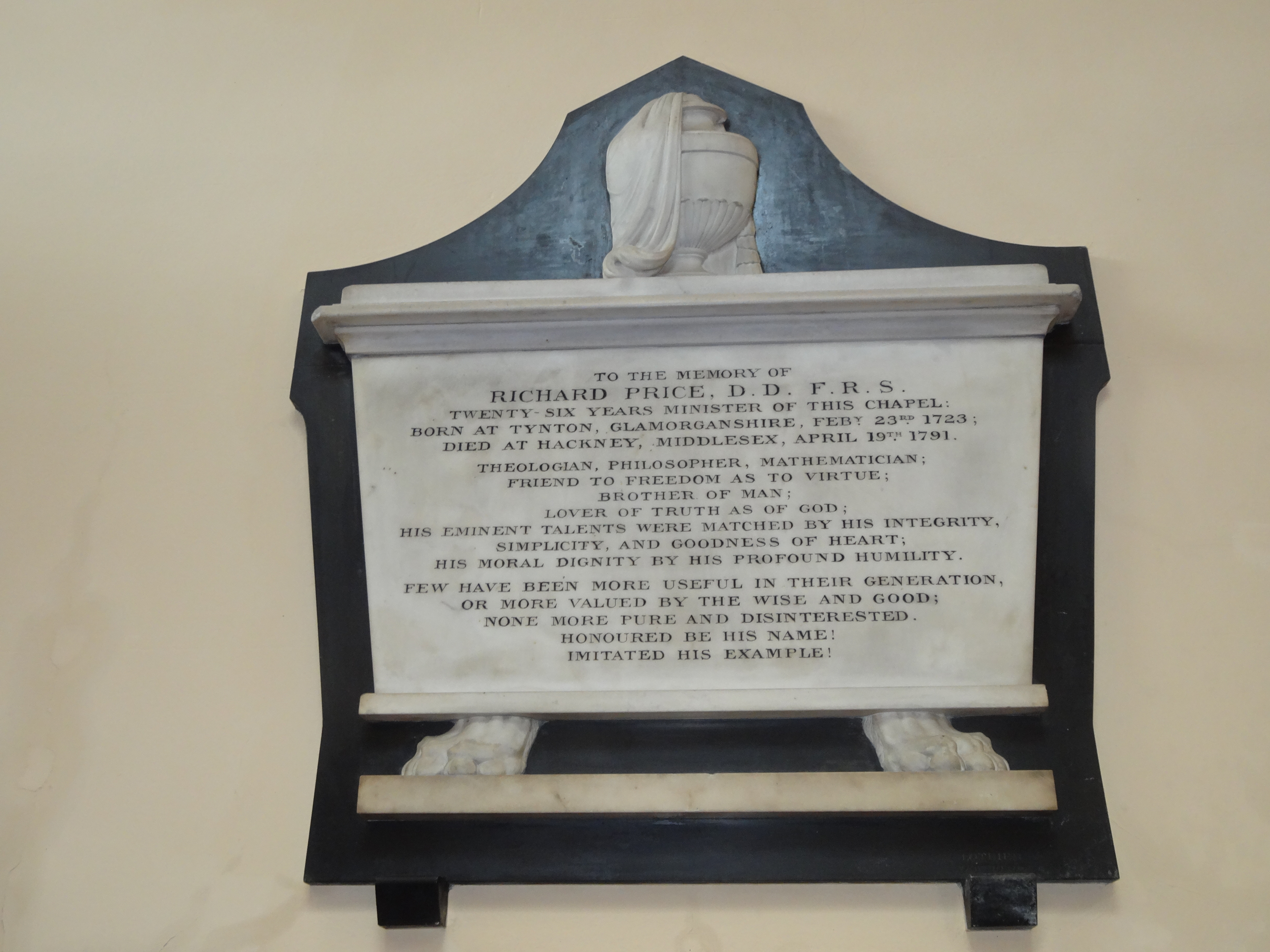
Memorial to Price in Newington Green Unitarian Church

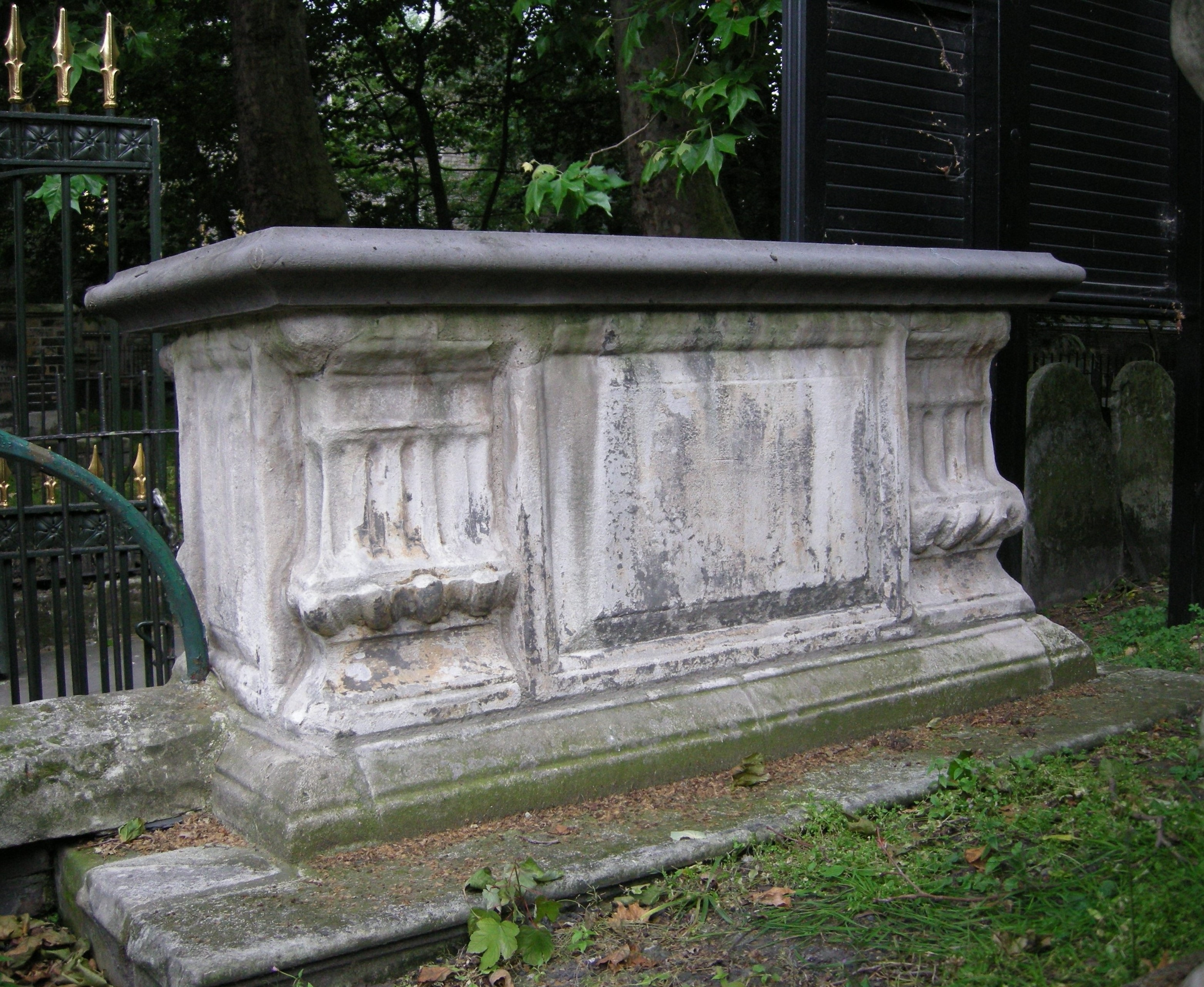
Tomb of Price and his wife Sarah in Bunhill Fields burial ground

In 1767 Price received the honorary degree of D.D. from the University of Aberdeen, and in 1769 another from the University of Glasgow. In 1786 Sarah Price died, and there had been no children by the marriage.

In the same year Price with other Dissenters founded Hackney New College. On 19 April 1791 Price died. He was buried at Bunhill Fields, where his funeral sermon was preached by Joseph Priestley.

His extended family included William Morgan, the actuary, and his brother George Cadogan Morgan (1754–1798), dissenting minister and scientist, both sons of Richard Price's sister Sarah by William Morgan, a surgeon of Bridgend, Glamorganshire.

== Publications ==
In 1744 Price published a volume of sermons. It was, however, as a writer on financial and political questions that Price became widely known. Price rejected traditional Christian notions of original sin and moral punishment, preaching the perfectibility of human nature, and he wrote on theological questions. He also wrote on finance, economics, probability, and life insurance.

=== Thomas Bayes ===
Price was asked to become literary executor of Thomas Bayes, the mathematician. He edited Bayes's major work An Essay Towards Solving a Problem in the Doctrine of Chances (1763), which appeared in Philosophical Transactions, and contains Bayes' theorem, one of the fundamental results of probability theory. Price wrote an introduction to the paper, which provides some of the philosophical basis of Bayesian statistics. In 1765, he was elected a Fellow of the Royal Society in recognition of his work on the legacy of Bayes.

=== Demographer ===
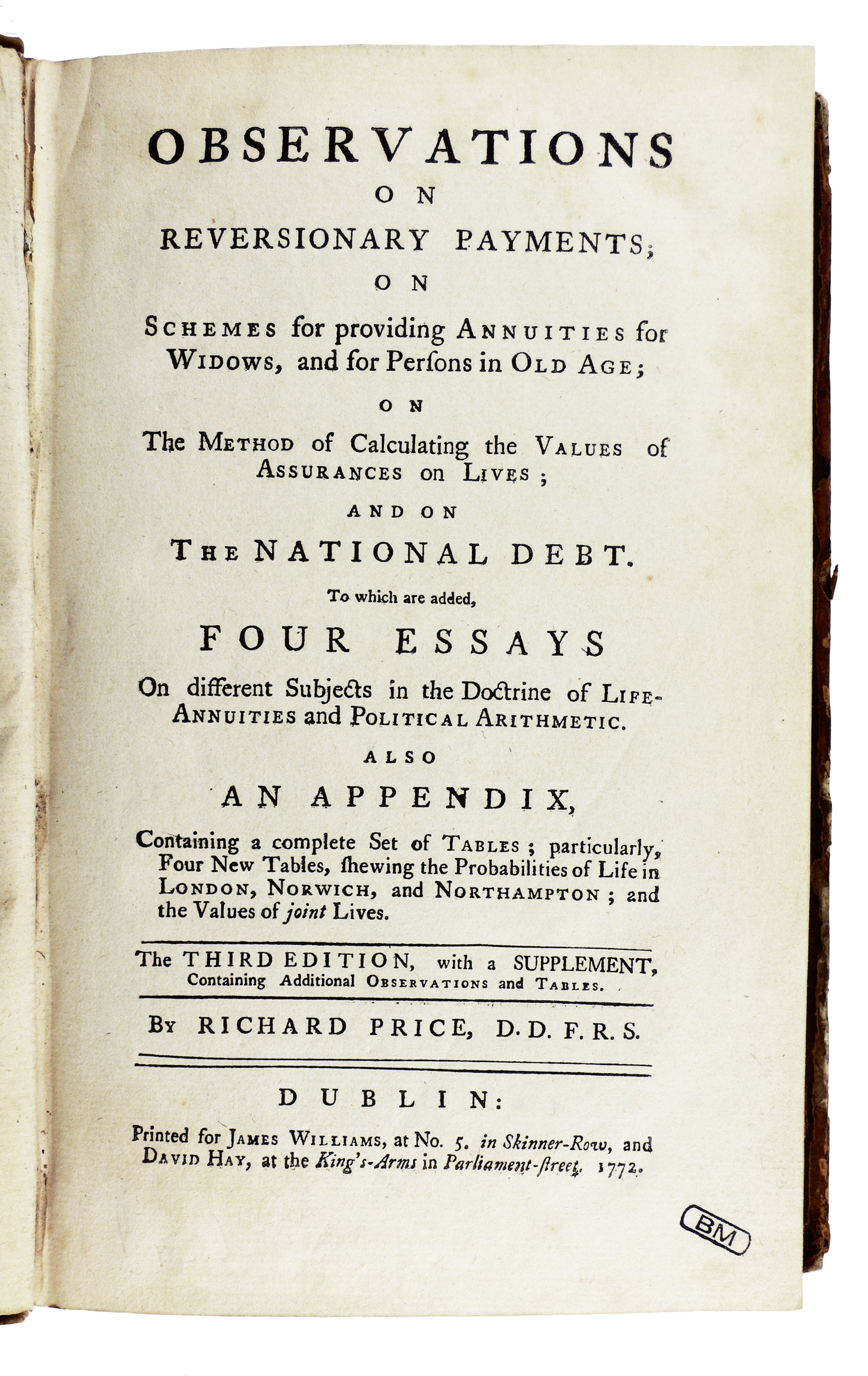
Observations on reversionary payments, 1772

From about 1766 Price worked with the Society for Equitable Assurances. In 1769, in a letter to Benjamin Franklin, he made some observations on life expectancy, and the population of London, which were published in the Philosophical Transactions of that year. Price's views included the detrimental effects of large cities, and the need for some constraints on commerce and movement of population.

In particular, Price took an interest in the figures of Franklin and Ezra Stiles on the colonial population in America, thought in some places to be doubling every 22 years. A debate on the British population had begun in the 1750s (with William Brakenridge, Richard Forster, Robert Wallace who pointed to manufacturing and smallpox as factors reducing population, and William Bell), but was inconclusive in the face of a lack of sound figures. The issue was of interest to European writers generally. The quantitative form of Price's theory on the contrasting depopulation in England and Wales amounted to an approximate drop in population of 25 per cent since 1688. It was disputed numerically by Arthur Young in his Political Arithmetic (1774), which took in also criticism of the physiocrats.

In May 1770 Price presented to the Royal Society a paper on the proper method of calculating the values of contingent reversions. His book Observations on Reversionary Payments (1771) became a classic, in use for about a century, and providing the basis for financial calculations of insurance and benefit societies, of which many had recently been formed. The "Northampton table", a life table compiled by Price with data from Northampton, became standard for about a century in actuarial work. It was used by life insurance companies such as Scottish Widows and Clerical Medical. It, too, overestimated mortality. In consequence, it was good for the insurance business, and adverse for those purchasing annuities. Price's nephew William Morgan was an actuary, and became manager of the Equitable in 1775. He later wrote a memoir of Price's life.

Price wrote a further Essay on the Population of England (2nd edition, 1780), which influenced Thomas Robert Malthus. Price's continuing claim in it on British depopulation was challenged by John Howlett in 1781. Investigation of actual causes of ill-health began at this period, in a group of radical physicians around Priestley, including Price but centred on the Midlands and north-west: with John Aikin, Matthew Dobson, John Haygarth and Thomas Percival. Of these Haygarth and Percival supplied Price with figures, to supplement those he had collected himself in Northampton parishes.

=== Public finance ===
In 1771 Price published his Appeal to the Public on the Subject of the National Debt (ed. 1772 and 1774). This pamphlet excited considerable controversy, and is supposed to have influenced William Pitt the Younger in re-establishing the sinking fund for the extinction of the national debt, created by Robert Walpole in 1716 and abolished in 1733. The means proposed for the extinction of the debt are described by Lord Overstone as "a sort of hocus-pocus machinery," supposed to work "without loss to any one," and consequently unsound. Price's views were attacked by John Brand in 1776. When Brand returned to finance and fiscal matters, Alteration of the Constitution of the House of Commons and the Inequality of the Land Tax (1793), he used work of Price, among others.

=== Moral philosophy ===
The Review of the Principal Questions in Morals (1758, 3rd ed. revised 1787) contains Price's theory of ethics. The work is supposedly a refutation of Francis Hutcheson. Price represented a different tradition, deontological ethics rather than the virtue ethics of Hutcheson, going back to Samuel Clarke and John Balguy. The book is divided into ten chapters, the first of which gives his main ethical theory, allied to that of Ralph Cudworth. Other chapters show his relation to Joseph Butler and Immanuel Kant. Philosophically and politically Price had something in common with Thomas Reid. As a moralist Price is now regarded as a precursor to the rational intuitionism of the 20th century. He drew, among other sources, on Cicero and Panaetius, and has been labelled a "British Platonist".

J. G. A. Pocock comments that Price was a moralist first, putting morality well ahead of democratic attachments. Price was widely criticised for that and for an absence of interest in civil society. As well as Burke, John Adams, Adam Ferguson and Josiah Tucker wrote against him. James Mackintosh wrote that Price was attempting to revive moral obligation. Théodore Simon Jouffroy preferred Price to Cudworth, Reid and Dugald Stewart. See also William Whewell's History of Moral Philosophy in England; Alexander Bain's Mental and Moral Sciences; and Thomas Fowler's monograph on Shaftesbury and Hutcheson.

For Price, right and wrong belong to actions in themselves, and he rejects consequentialism. This ethical value is perceived by reason or understanding, which intuitively recognises fitness or congruity between actions, agents and total circumstances. Arguing that ethical judgment is an act of discrimination, he endeavours to invalidate moral sense theory. He admits that right actions must be "grateful" to us; that, in fact, moral approbation includes both an act of the understanding and an emotion of the heart. Still it remains true that reason alone, in its highest development, would be a sufficient guide. In this conclusion he is in close agreement with Kant; reason is the arbiter, and right is:

1. not a matter of the emotions and
2. no relative to imperfect human nature.

Price's main point of difference with Cudworth is that while Cudworth regards the moral criterion as a νόημα or modification of the mind, existing in germ and developed by circumstances, Price regards it as acquired from the contemplation of actions, but acquired necessarily, immediately intuitively. In his view of disinterested action (ch. iii.) he follows Butler. Happiness he regards as the only end, conceivable by us, of divine Providence, but it is a happiness wholly dependent on rectitude. Virtue tends always to happiness, and in the end must produce it in its perfect form.

=== Other works ===
Price also wrote Fast-day Sermons, published respectively in 1779 and 1781. Throughout the American War, he preached sermons on fast-days and took the opportunity to attack Britain's coercive policies toward the colonies. A complete list of his works was given as an appendix to Priestley's Funeral Sermon.

== Commemoration ==
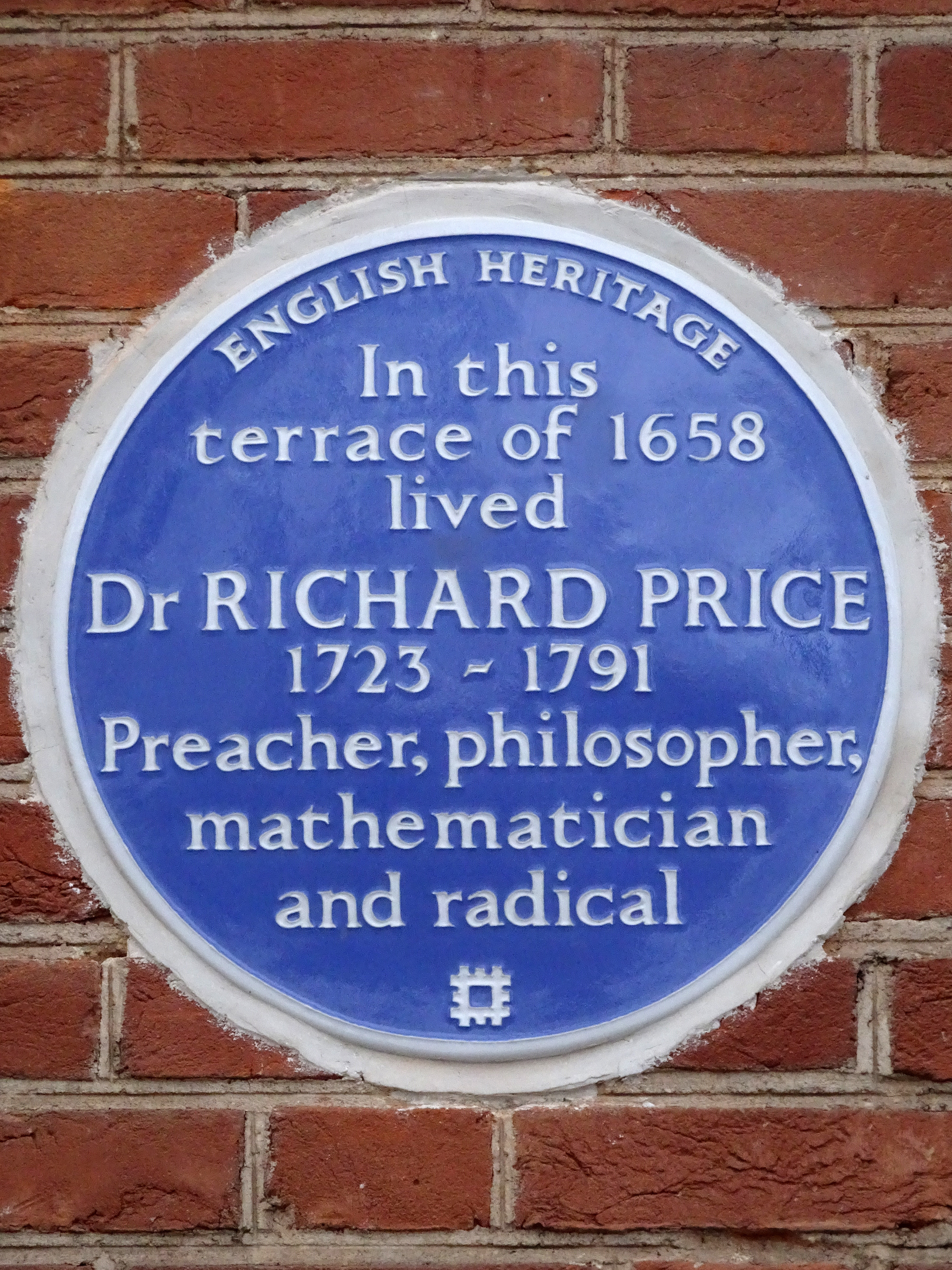
Blue plaque commemorating Price at 54 Newington Green, erected 2023

Spray paint and laser cut stencil images of Price created by the artist Stewy were installed on the exterior wall of the John Percival Building at Cardiff University in 2022 in anticipation of the 300th anniversary of Price's birth.

In February 2023, an English Heritage blue plaque in honour of Price was installed on a wall at 54 Newington Green, where he lived, and close to the Newington Green Nonconformist chapel where he was a pastor. The plaque was unveiled by newsreader and journalist Huw Edwards. A series of events to celebrate Price's tercentenary in 2023 has been organised in Llangeinor, his place of birth, around Wales and in London. The Richard Price Society commemorates Price in multiple ways.

== See also ==
- Liberalism
- Contributions to liberal theory

== Notes ==
Attribution
