= James Burgh =

British politician and writer (1714–1775)

James Burgh (1714–1775) was a British Whig politician whose book Political Disquisitions set out an early case for free speech and universal suffrage: in it, he writes, "All lawful authority, legislative, and executive, originates from the people." He has been judged "one of England's foremost propagandists for radical reform".

Burgh also ran a dissenting academy and wrote on subjects such as educational reform. Lyndall Gordon said that his widow acted as "fairy godmother" to early feminist Mary Wollstonecraft, then a young and unpublished schoolmistress, helping her to set up her own boarding school. Wollstonecraft entitled her first book Thoughts on the Education of Daughters (1787), alluding to Burgh's Thoughts on Education (1747) which in turn alludes to John Locke's 1693 work, Some Thoughts Concerning Education.

== Life and works ==
Burgh was born and raised in Madderty, Scotland. His father was a minister of the parish in the Church of Scotland. Burgh was raised a Presbyterian, which strongly contributed to his fight for moral issues. He attended St. Andrews University with the intention of studying for the ministry. An illness prevented him from completing his degree and he entered the linen trade. Failure at that sent him to England in the early 1740s. For a short time he was a printer's helper and then in 1746 he became an assistant master (teacher) in an academy just north of London. The next year, he became master (principal) of his own academy in Stoke Newington. In 1750, he moved his school to nearby Newington Green, and ran it there for 19 years.

In 1754 Burgh's The Dignity of Human Nature was published. In 1761 Burgh wrote The Art of Speaking, an educational book focusing on oratory. In 1766 he wrote the first volume of Crito, a collection of essays on religious toleration, contemporary politics, and educational theories. The second volume followed a year later.

Burgh became involved in the early 1760s with a group called the Honest Whigs, a club that met on alternate Thursday evenings in a coffeehouse, then an important social and political meeting place. Other members of the group included Richard Price, Joseph Priestley, Benjamin Franklin, James Boswell and others. In 1774, Burgh wrote his most popular work, Political Disquisitions. The three-volume work was intended by Burgh to be longer, but his deteriorating health caused him to stop after the third volume. Burgh died a year later on 26 August 1775.

== Bibliography ==
- Burgh, James. Political Disquisitions. Volume III. New York: Da Capo Press, 1971.
- Burgh, James. The Art of Speaking. 4th ed. Philadelphia: Printed and sold by R Aitken, bookseller, 1775.

== Sources ==
- Hay, Carla H. James Burgh, Spokesman for Reform in Hanoverian England. Washington D.C.: University Press of America, 1979.
- Kramnick, Isaac. "Republicanism Revisited: The Case of James Burgh". Proceedings of the American Antiquarian Society, Volume 102, Part 1: 81-98. Worcester, Massachusetts: Published by the Society, 1992.
