= Newington Green =

Open space in North London, England

Coordinates: 51°33′5.53″N 0°5′6.38″W

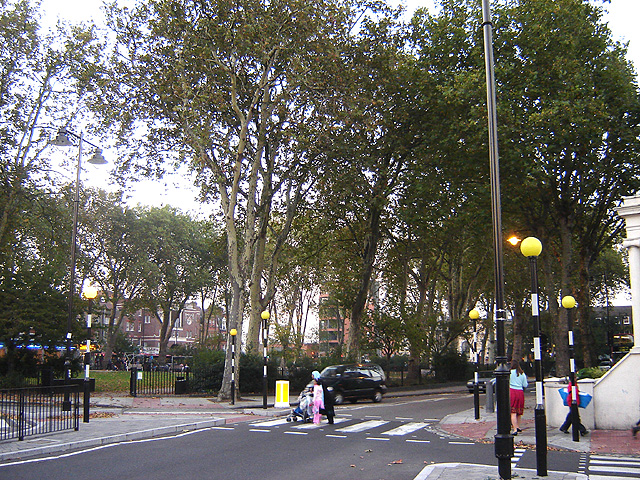
- Newington Green looking northwest from Mildmay Park
- London borough: Hackney; Islington
- Ceremonial county: Greater London
- Region: London
- Country: England
- Sovereign state: United Kingdom
- Post town: LONDON
- Postcode district: N16 N5
- Dialling code: 020
- Police: Metropolitan
- Fire: London
- Ambulance: London
- UK Parliament: Islington South & Finsbury; Hackney North and Stoke Newington
- London Assembly: North East; North East

Newington Green is an open space in North London between Islington and Hackney. It gives its name to the surrounding area, roughly bounded by Ball's Pond Road to the south, Petherton Road to the west, Green Lanes and Matthias Road to the north, and Boleyn Road to the east. The Green is in N16 and the area is covered by the N16, N1 and N5 postcodes. Newington Green Meeting House is situated near the park.

== Origin ==
The first record of the area is as "Neutone" in the Domesday Survey of 1086, when it still formed part of the demesne of St Paul's Cathedral. In the 13th century, Newton became Newington, whilst the prefix "Stoke" was added in the area to the north, distinguishing it from Newington Barrow or Newington Berners in Islington. Newington Barrow later became known as Highbury, after the manor house built on a hill. There was probably a medieval settlement, and the prevailing activity was agriculture, growing hay and food for the inhabitants of nearby London. By the 15th century, the area had become more prosperous and in 1445 there were a good number of Londoners living in the hamlet. The name Newington Green was first mentioned in 1480. By the 1490s it was fringed by cottages, homesteads and crofts on the three sides in Newington Barrow manor in Islington. The north side was divided between the manors of Stoke Newington and Brownswood in South Hornsey.

== Royal visitors and prominent residents ==
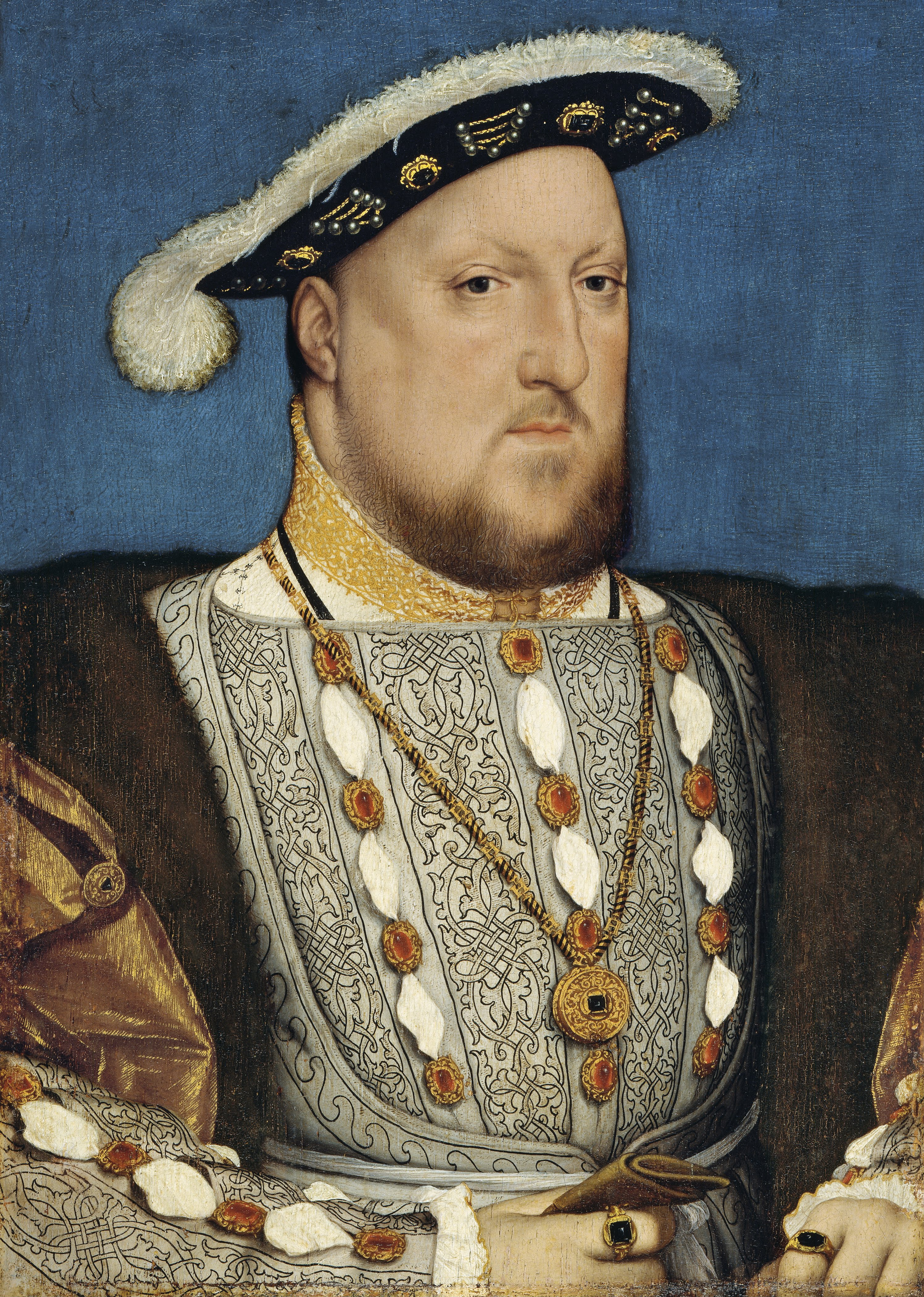
King Henry VIII, who hunted in the area

In the 16th century, the area had connections with the court of King Henry VIII (r. 1509–1547). The king used a house on the south side of the Green as a base for hunting the wild bulls, stags and wild boars that roamed the surrounding forest.

In 1523, a resident of the north side of the Green, the future 6th Earl of Northumberland, Henry Percy (at that time a page of Cardinal Wolsey), became engaged to Anne Boleyn. Lord Percy had not sought permission either from his father or from the king, causing Wolsey to scold him and his father to forbid the marriage. Later, in 1536, the 6th earl found himself a member of the jury that convicted Anne of adultery. His home, Brook House, stood at the northeast corner of the square. It contained a central courtyard and was decorated with gilded and painted wainscotting. It was later demolished, renamed Bishop's Place, and divided into tenements for the poor.

In 1535, Henry VIII's chief minister (the equivalent of today's prime minister), Thomas Cromwell (in office 1534 to 1540), took up residence at Canonbury House to the south of the area, from where he organised the dissolution of the monasteries (1536–1541) and their transfer into Crown ownership. Other Canonbury Tower residents included:

- in the 16th century, John Dudley, Earl of Warwick and afterwards Duke of Northumberland, general, admiral, and politician
- in the 17th century, Francis Bacon, one of the fathers of the scientific method, at that time the Attorney General, and Sir Thomas Coventry, afterwards Lord Keeper of the Great Seal
- in the 18th century, Oliver Goldsmith, the writer

== Samuel Pepys ==
The 17th-century diarist Samuel Pepys was sent to Newington Green and Kingsland by his mother in order to benefit from the fresh air and open spaces of what was then a rural area.

== Mildmay ==
A map showing the Mildmay ward of Islington Metropolitan Borough as it appeared in 1916.

Newington Green's history is marked by several streets in the area taking their name from this period, such as King Henry's Walk, Boleyn Road (formerly Ann Boleyn's Walk), Wolsey Road and Queen Elizabeth's Walk. Many other thoroughfares are named after the Mildmay estate, including Mildmay Park, Mildmay Grove North and Mildmay Grove South.

By 1611, what became known as the Mildmay estate was owned by the Halliday, or Holliday, family. In 1673, ownership passed to Henry Mildmay, second son of Sir Henry Mildmay, who in turn was grandson of Sir Walter Mildmay, via the female line of the Halliday family owing to a lack of male heirs.

Sir Walter Mildmay was the Chancellor of the Exchequer under Elizabeth I. He was one of the special commissioners in the trial of Mary, Queen of Scots, and founded Emmanuel College, Cambridge in 1584.

His grandson Sir Henry Mildmay served as MP and was Master of the Jewel House for Charles I. Henry was critical of the king's religious policies, supported Parliament during the civil wars and attended the king's trial. After the Restoration Henry was arrested for his part in the regicide, but granted leniency because he had refused to sign the king's death warrant. Instead of the death penalty he was sent to the Tower of London, stripped of his knighthood and his estates and sentenced to life imprisonment.

Mildmay was the base for a very influential missionary organisation founded by the Reverend William Pennefather, after he became vicar at St Jude's, Mildmay (now St Jude & St Paul's) in 1864. The organisation trained deaconesses for helping the poor, ultimately training 200 at any one time and serving 20 missions throughout the UK, of which 12 were in London. In 1866, inspired by the cholera epidemic of 1866, a nursing branch was started that supported the Mildmay cottage hospital and from 1874 a medical mission in Bethnal Green. In 1869, the organisation had a new conference centre built on land south of Newington Green that could accommodate 2,500-3,000 people. From 1885 nurses lived in numbers 9 and 10, Newington Green and a training home was opened at The Willows, near Clissold Park. Mildmay Mission Hospital was founded in 1892. It was absorbed into the National Health Service (NHS) in 1948, and in the 1980s began pioneering work into the treatment of patients with HIV/AIDS, which it continues. In February 2024, it was announced that the North London line and West London line of the London Overground were to be renamed the "Mildmay line" after the hospital.

Mildmay Park, located on the street of the same name, was a station on the North London Railway. Opened in 1880, it closed in 1934. The station building was demolished in 1987, but remnants of the platforms can still be seen at track level.

The Mildmay Club, formerly the Mildmay Radical Club, is a working men's club and member of the Club and Institute Union. It was founded in 1888 and is located at 33-34 Newington Green. The prominent building, which was completed in 1905, hosts community events and an original snooker hall, being one of the largest such clubs in London.

== Nonconformists and the Dissenting Academies ==
The area became the home of English Dissenters during the 17th century. Following the religious upheavals after the Restoration, some Protestants chose to remain in England and maintain their faith openly, but they had to live with the restrictions the state placed upon them. They moved to places tolerant of them; often they set up educational establishments, known in general as dissenting academies, which were intellectually and morally more rigorous than the universities. One such place was Newington Green, then still an agricultural village, but conveniently near London.) Oliver Cromwell's family had links there: his great-granddaughter Mary was born at the Green on 11 April 1691.

A critical mass of "dissident intellectuals, pedagogues with reforming ideas and Dissenters" and "the well-to-do edge of radical Protestantism" clustered around Newington Green, and other villages nearby such as Stoke Newington and Hackney. Not all of these free-thinkers were Unitarians: other notables include the Quaker physician John Coakley Lettsome and the Anglican pacifist Vicesimus Knox.

One such academy was set up on north of the Green, run by Charles Morton. One of the academy's students was Daniel Defoe, the writer, journalist and spy famous for his novel Robinson Crusoe. Another pupil was the controversial poet Samuel Wesley, father of John Wesley, the great religious leader. A later schoolmaster was the Rev. James Burgh, author of The Dignity of Human Nature and Thoughts on Education, who opened his Dissenting Academy on the green in 1750 and sent his pupils to the church there.

== Unitarian Church, Price and Wollstonecraft ==
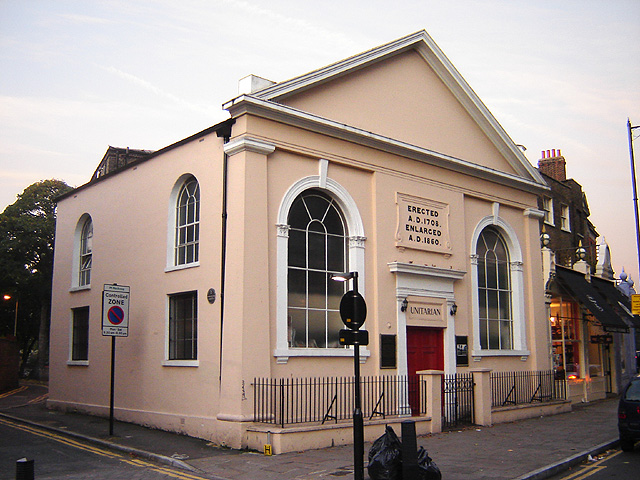
The Unitarian church was built in 1708.

In 1708, the Newington Green Unitarian Church (NGUC) was built on the north, Hackney side of the Green. That congregation continues today as New Unity. The minister whose name is still remembered centuries later is Dr Richard Price, a libertarian and republican who cemented the village's "reputation as a centre for radical thinkers and social reformers". He arrived in 1758 with his wife Sarah, and took up residence in No. 54 the Green, in the middle of a terrace even then a hundred years old (The building still survives as London's oldest brick terrace, dated 1658). Many important politicians, thinkers, reformers, and writers visited him at Newington Green, including Founding Fathers of the United States, British politicians such as Lord Lyttleton, the Earl of Shelburne, Earl Stanhope (known as "Citizen Stanhope"), and even the Prime Minister William Pitt; philosophers David Hume and Adam Smith; agitators such as prison reformer John Howard, gadfly John Horne Tooke and husband and wife John and Ann Jebb. Price was fortunate in forming close friendships among his neighbours and congregants. One was Thomas Rogers, father of poet and banker Samuel Rogers, a merchant turned banker who had married into a long-established Dissenting family and lived at No. 56 the Green. Another was the Rev. James Burgh, author of The Dignity of Human Nature and Thoughts on Education, who opened his Dissenting Academy on the green in 1750 and sent his pupils to Price's sermons. Price, Rogers, and Burgh formed a dining club, eating at each other's houses in rotation. When Joseph Priestley's support of dissent led to the riots named after him, he fled Birmingham and headed for the sanctuary of Newington Green, where Rogers took him in.

One of the most important residents of the Green was the early feminist Mary Wollstonecraft, who moved her fledgling school for girls from Islington to Newington Green in 1784. It was Mrs Burgh, widow of the educationalist, who used her influence to find the young schoolmistress a house to rent and 20 students to fill it. The flavour of the village and the approach of these Rational Dissenters appealed to Wollstonecraft: they were hard-working, humane, critical but uncynical, and respectful towards women. The ideas Wollstonecraft ingested from the sermons at NGUC pushed her towards a political awakening. A couple of years after she left Newington Green, these seeds germinated into A Vindication of the Rights of Men, a response to Burke's denunciation of the French Revolution and attack on Price. In 1792, she published the work for which she is best remembered, A Vindication of the Rights of Woman, in the spirit of rationalism extending Price's arguments about equality to women. Newington Green had made its mark on Mary, and through this founding work of feminist philosophy, on the world. A Sculpture for Mary Wollstonecraft was unveiled in Newington Green on 10 November 2020.

== The New River ==
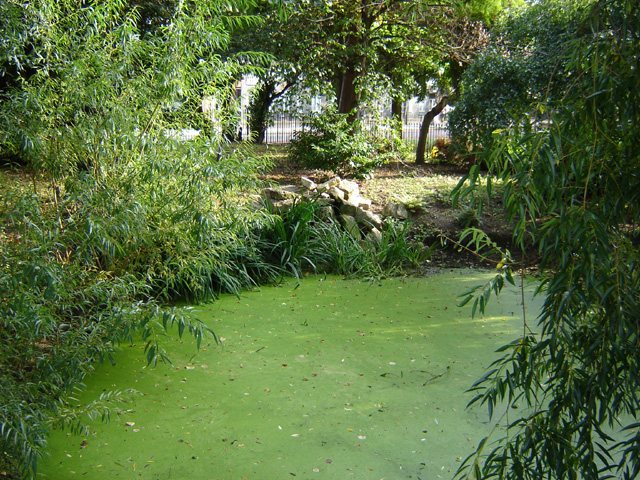
The New River in Clissold Park.

In 1602, it was proposed that a new river should be constructed to provide London with its first clean, fresh water. Sir Hugh Myddleton, a Welsh goldsmith and philanthropist, was given the responsibility, and in 1609 he built a canal from the Hertfordshire rivers of Chadwell and Amwell, 38 miles to the New River Head in Clerkenwell. Originally open to the air, the aqueduct flowed down the centre of the present day Petherton Road. It was later covered for sanitary reasons.

In 1808, Rochemont Barbauld was appointed minister to Newington Green Unitarian Church. His wife, Anna Laetitia Barbauld (1743–1825), was a prolific writer, admired by Samuel Johnson and William Wordsworth. She enjoyed a long friendship with Joseph Priestley and William Enfield, starting from their years together at the Warrington Academy in the 1760s, where her father was a tutor. She wrote poems (including a tribute to Priestley), hymns, children's literature, and political and religious tracts. She was an abolitionist, addressing one of her works to William Wilberforce. In 1793, he saw her contribution to the Pamphlet War, "Sins of the Government, Sins of the Nation". Two years later she wrote The Rights of Women, but this was not published until her death thirty years later. Rochemont eventually went violently insane, attacked his wife and committed suicide by drowning himself in the river.

In 1946, the supply was redirected at Stoke Newington, and in 1990 the New River was replaced by deep mains. Part of the New River's original course through Canonbury has now been turned into an ornamental walk.

== Synagogues and Jewish life ==
Other religious institutions existed nearby. Jews fleeing the pogroms of the Russian Empire established a congregation by 1876, and built the Dalston Synagogue in adjoining Poets Road in 1885. This became one of the leading synagogues of London, with Jacob Koussevitzsky as its cantor from 1936.

For a period from the end of the 19th century, the Newington Green area was host to a large Jewish population, which was beginning to leave the East End and move northwards towards Stoke Newington and Stamford Hill. The original Adath Israel orthodox congregation was founded in 1911 and its first permanent building was in Alma Road, off Green Lanes, before moving on towards Stoke Newington and the other side of Clissold Park in the 1950s.

A large United Synagogue was built in Poets Road near Dalston Junction Station in the 1870s. In the 1930s, the Poets Road Synagogue was the home of one of the world's leading cantors, a member of the Kusevitsky family. At its height in 1960, the Poets Road Synagogue had 463 male seat-holders. The synagogue remained active until it closed down in the late 1960s, as the remaining Jewish population moved on further afield and its site was sold. In 1970, the building and its stained glass windows were demolished and replaced by a block of council flats.

== 19th century ==
In the early part of the 19th century, there was a change in the character of Newington Green. After a patient struggle of 150 years, the English Dissenters were finally freed from their civil disabilities with the passage of the Doctrine of the Trinity Act 1813. With, it seemed, nothing left to fight for on that front, Nonconformists no longer needed the security of the Newington Green, and the area lost some of its intellectual cohesiveness. The church touched a low point. The nature of Newington Green had changed—the fresh bucolic village had been swallowed up by London's relentless growth, and had become a "thriving and expanding suburb". With this growth of prosperity also came a tide of poverty, and this was to prove the mission for the Victorian era. A hundred years before, the ethos had been one of almost Puritan self-reliance, but now the Dickensian poverty, evident in cholera epidemics and rampant malnutrition, made social responsibility an urgent necessity. The minister who guided the first 25 years of this (1839–1864) was Thomas Cromwell, FSA (1792–1870). (Like many Anglican vicars, one of his hobbies was local history.) In 1840, a Sunday school was set up for poor children, and soon thereafter a Domestic Mission Society, to visit the poor in their homes. A library and a savings club emphasised self-help. A regular day school ran from 1860 for ten years, until primary education became the responsibility of the state with the passing of the Elementary Education Act 1870.

The "small but energetic community" continued to campaign on the larger political stage. Religious freedom and self-improvement were their watchwords. In the last decades of the 19th century, the church thrived and its congregation grew to 80 subscribers. The London Sunday School Society recognised the one at Newington Green as the best in its class, educating up to 200 children and necessitating the construction in 1887 of the schoolhouse immediately behind the main church building. A range of groups sprang up, ranging from intellectual (a Society for Mutual Theological Study) to recreational (cycling and cricket). Young men's and young women's groups met, as did the mothers' meeting, a Provident Society, and teetotalism (abstinence from alcohol) support for adults and children. Other issues of concern were education, social reform and women's suffrage.

Some individuals who lived at the Green during this period included Thomas Rees, the minister after Barbauld, who was a leading authority of the history of Unitarianism, and made connections with the Unitarian Church of Transylvania. Alexander Gilchrist, son of another minister, was the biographer of William Blake. Andrew Pritchard improved the microscope and studied microscopic organisms; he was a friend of Michael Faraday and for him, science and religion were one. He led the Newington Green Conversation Society, membership restricted to 16, a successor to the Mutual Instruction Society. Marian Pritchard is described as an unsung heroine, and "one of the leaders of modern Unitarianism". She set up Oxford Summer Schools for the training of Sunday School teachers and Winifred House Invalid Children's Convalescent Home. John Stuart Mill recalls his family living in Newington Green "from 1810 to the end of 1813"; it was at the time "an almost rustic neighbourhood", and it was during walks with his father before breakfast "generally in the green lanes towards Hornsey" ("my earliest recollections of green fields and wild flowers") that John Stuart would recount to James Mill what he had learnt reading the previous day.

== 20th century ==
Then came 1914, and the horrors of World War I. Men from Newington Green fell in battle. Meanwhile, many of the older people with long family ties to Newington Green simply died. The professional middle class had largely left the area. By 1930, "it was whispered that the church could not survive", but it did, with an influential supporter, an alderman and councillor in the Borough of Stoke Newington. Although attendance at services was small, other activities drew in crowds: 100 to the temperance meetings, for example. The outbreak of World War II meant that children were evacuated temporarily from London, so the Sunday Schools and Young People's Leagues ceased for a time. The Sunday services never missed a week, however, even when the building was badly damaged by a landmine blast: they just moved to the schoolhouse. After the war, the ministry focused on building bridges between races and faiths, e.g. with the Jewish community of North London, and was recognised by the World Congress of Faiths. Services were often attended by local politicians, including the mayor of Stoke Newington. Leaders for the national Unitarian movement continued to be found within the congregation at Newington Green.

In 1979, the Newington Green Action Group (NGAG) was formed, with the aim of regenerating the area. NGAG worked with Islington Council on this project and traffic calming measures were installed to ease the notorious local congestion, with additional pedestrian crossings providing easier and safer access to the Green on foot. The Green was regenerated to include more lawn space, a play area and a café. New planting has enhanced the Green and was chosen to encourage biodiversity.

== 21st century ==
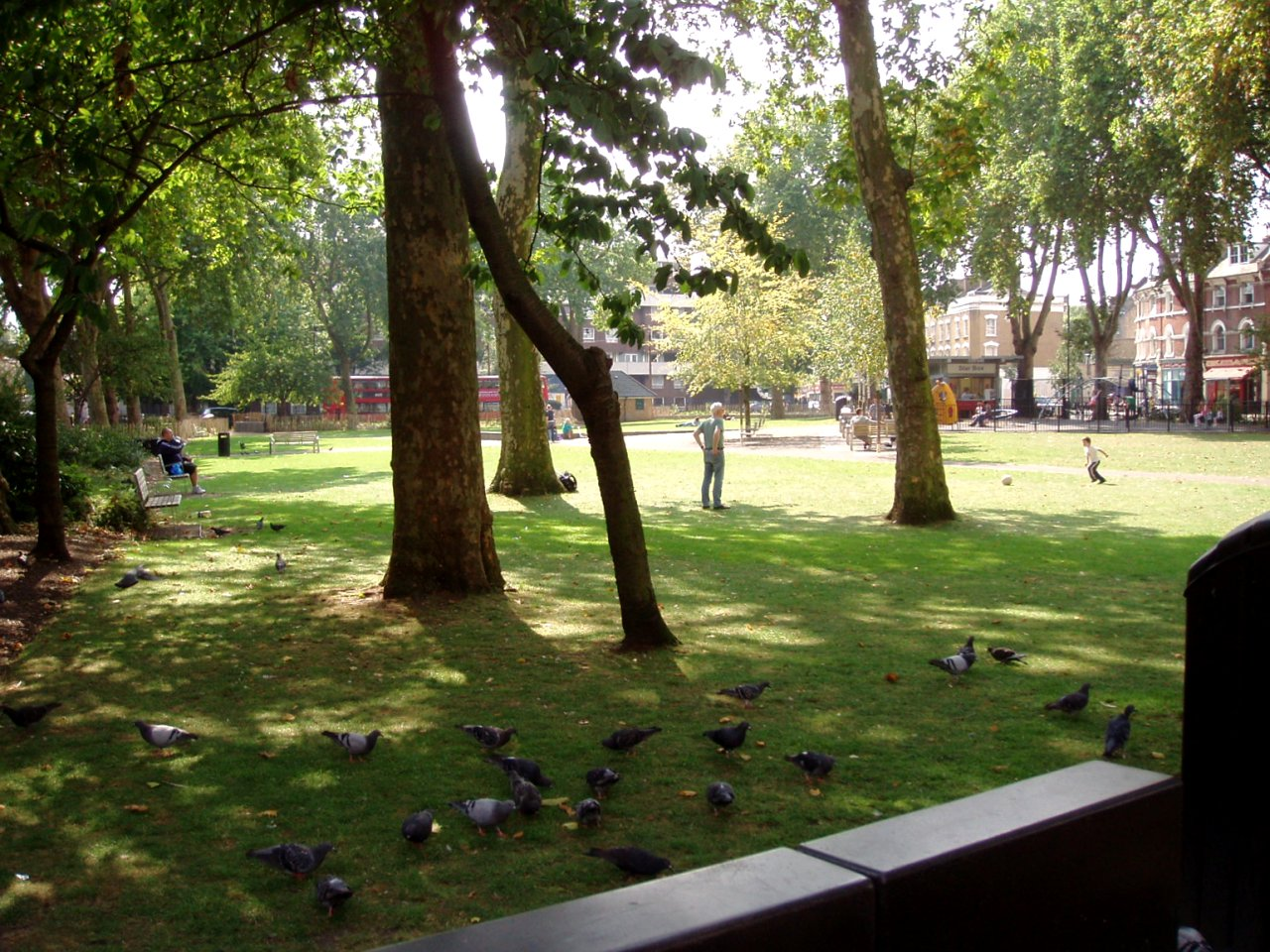
The Green in 2007

Newington Green has grown in popularity with the local community, evinced by the children that now play in the formerly deserted park, which is once more being used like a village green. Community groups hold fairs on the Green and NGAG has organised many events including the annual Jazz on the Green and Open Garden Squares day. These improvements are such that, in 2006, Newington Green won the first of many Green Flag Awards (the national standard for parks and green spaces in England and Wales, sponsored by Keep Britain Tidy). It has also won the Green Heritage Site Award for several years running, which is sponsored by English Heritage. In 2010 NGAG teamed up with the Mayville Gardening Club and the King Henry's Walk Community Garden; the Newington Green area was awarded a High Silver Gilt Royal Horticultural Society Urban Communities Award, as part of the London in Bloom Scheme.

The Newington Green Action Group also published a local history book The Village That Changed the World: A History of Newington Green London N16 by Alex Allardyce in 2008, which won the Walter Bor Award the following year.

Newington Green and Newington Green Road to the south constitute the commercial and cultural centre of the district. This area shares in the gentrification of Islington and Stoke Newington, so the old shopping area has now been supplemented by a number of new and trendy shops, bars and restaurants. However, there is a substantial Turkish Cypriot community in the area, members of whom run many of the local grocery stores.

Since the millennium, two new ministers at the Unitarian Church have injected energy into the Green and added to its events and publicity. Cathal (Cal) Courtney, characterised as a "radical spirit" who had made a "remarkable spiritual journey", opened the church for a multi-faith silent protest vigil through the night before the huge march against the Iraq War. He used his inaugural column in the N16 magazine to address the international furore around Gene Robinson's election as bishop. He was written about as the Right-On Reverend in The Oldie's monthly "East of Islington" column. Courtney revived the Richard Price Memorial Lecture, which had last been given in 1981. NGUC now sponsors it annually, to "(address) a topical or important aspect of liberty, reason and ethics."

The current minister is Andrew (Andy) Pakula, an American who grew up in a secular Jewish family in New York. Newington Green Unitarian Church made history when it became the first religious establishment in Britain to refuse to carry out any weddings at all until same-sex couples have the right to full legal marriage. The BBC called it a "gay rights church" for its unanimous committee vote suspending full wedding services.

NGUC celebrated its tercentenary in 2008 under the slogan "300 years of dissent", marking this with events such as planting a crab apple tree, organising a picnic in conjunction with the Newington Green Action Group, and hosting a concert of Ottoman classical music. (Newington Green has a strong Turkish population.) The following year it commemorated the 250th anniversary of the birth of Mary Wollstonecraft, attaching a large banner to the railings outside the building, proclaiming it the "birthplace of feminism", in a nod to the formative years that she spent worshipping there. NGUC sponsored a series of events, including a return visit and lecture by biographer Barbara Taylor; a panel discussion about women and power, between female politicians Diane Abbott MP, Jean Lambert MEP, and Emily Thornberry MP; an art exhibition entitled Mother of Feminism; a concert featuring Carol Grimes and Adey Grummet to raise money for Stop the Traffik, an anti-trafficking charity; a tombstone tribute at St Pancras Old Church; a birthday cake baked by men; and other activities.

Weekly poetry readings are held at NGUC. It participates in the annual festival of architecture, Open House London. It hosts occasional concerts, such as that given by the London Gallery Quire, and the Psallite Women's Choir.

== Listed buildings ==
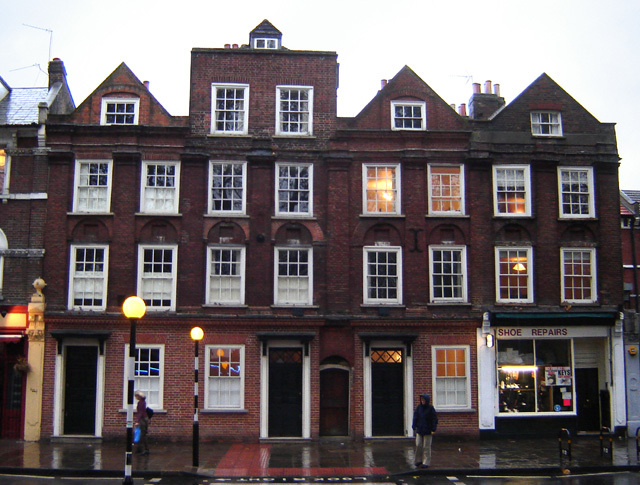
52–55 Newington Green – London's oldest surviving brick terrace, dated 1658. (November 2005)

This outlying area of Islington carries a surprising wealth of historic architecture and Newington Green has become a conservation area, and contains three Grade II listed buildings. On the west side of the Green (numbers 52–55) is London's oldest surviving brick terrace, which is Grade I listed. These were built in 1658, and 100 years later were home to Price and Rogers. Over the subsequent centuries many changes were made, internally and externally, in particular adding an extra storey to one of the middle houses and replacing its narrow staircase with a wider one with mid-Georgian detailing. At an unknown date the windows were enlarged and changed from mediaeval oak and leaded light mullion and transom pattern to Georgian vertically sliding sash windows. In the 1880s, the floor levels of the front rooms were lowered to street level and shop fronts were added to all of them. In the 1980s, the houses were in such poor condition that there was a serious danger of them collapsing. The Greater London Council bought three of them, carried out major structural repairs and sold them on to private clients. In 1994, conservation architects Roger Mears Architects were appointed to repair and/or reinstate the hugely significant plasterwork, panelling, doors, windows and other joinery and to return the houses to use as single family dwellings. New brick ground-floor frontages replaced the shopfronts, to a design appropriate to the elevations above, and the first floor brick cornice was reinstated. Residential London, particularly outside Westminster and the city, is essentially an 18th- or 19th-century city. Even in the centre, there are few brick houses this old, pre-dating the Great Fire of 1666. One of the properties has been extensively renovated under the guidance of Bere Architects (Islington).

To the north is the Unitarian Church, which celebrated its tercentenary in 2008. The original 1708 building was financed with £300 from goldsmith Edward Harrison. It was a "substantial brick building, of nearly square form, with the high, tiled, projecting roof, common at its era". "Historic views show that the original façade had a small pediment against a large hipped roof, with a central oval window below." This building was substantially extended and improved in the mid-19th century. An internal gallery was built to increase the seating available, and a few years later the roof and apse were renewed, and a "stuccoed frontage" was built, "mirroring the original façade with a three-bay front with two round-headed windows, but with added Tuscan pilasters and a large pediment". In the mid-20th century, the building was damaged by enemy action. In 1953, its architectural importance was recognised as a Grade II listed building.

Along from the Unitarian Church is the Mildmay Club, which was founded on 18 August 1888 as the Mildmay Radical Club and was originally located at 36 Newington Green Road south of Newington Green. In 1894, it moved to new premises at 34 Newington Green. Membership of the club rose from 1,000 in February 1896 to 2,400 in January 1899, eventually peaking at 3,000 members, and the current building was completed 1901 by Alfred Allen. Largely due to its preserved 1960s/70s interior and Queen Anne frontage, it is a popular location for film and photography, the income from which supports ongoing renovations and accessibility upgrades of the building.

== Institutions ==
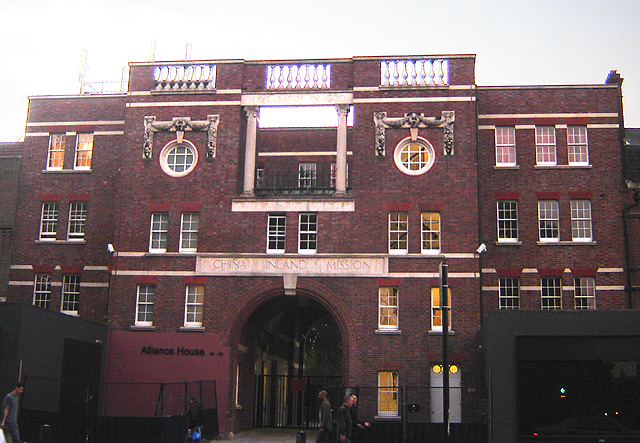
The China Inland Mission, one of two Grade II listed buildings on Newington Green. (October 2005)

Angel Chiropody is a post-'60s example of Brutalist Architecture

To the west is its neighbour, the former headquarters of the China Inland Mission, an organisation founded by James Hudson Taylor in 1865 and responsible for 18,000 converts to Christianity.
