= 1749 in literature =

This article contains information about the literary events and publications of 1749.

== Events ==
- February – The second part of John Cleland's erotic novel Fanny Hill (Memoirs of a Woman of Pleasure) appears in London. He is released from debtor's prison in March. The Church of England asks the Secretary of State to "stop the progress of this vile Book, which is an open insult upon Religion and good manners." In November, Cleland is arrested again, charged with "corrupting the King's subjects."
- February 28 – Henry Fielding's picaresque comic novel The History of Tom Jones, a Foundling is published in London by Andrew Millar, who pays the author £700. It reaches four editions by the end of the year. During this year, Fielding becomes magistrate at Bow Street and enlists help from the Bow Street Runners, an early police force.
- April 12 – Oxford's circular Radcliffe Library, designed by James Gibbs, opens.
- April 17 – Charles Macklin plays Lovegold in Henry Fielding's The Miser at Drury Lane, having previously played minor roles.
- unknown dates
  - Sarah Fielding's novel The Governess, or The Little Female Academy, generally seen as the first school story, is published in London.
  - Élie Catherine Fréron's journal Lettres de la comtesse de... is suppressed, but immediately replaced by his Lettres sur quelques écrits de ce temps.
  - Oliver Goldsmith graduates from Trinity College Dublin.

== New books ==
=== Prose ===
- Joseph Ames – Typographical Antiquities
- George Berkeley – A Word to the Wise
- John Brown – On Liberty
- Thomas Cannon – Ancient and Modern Pederasty Investigated and Exemplify'd
- William Rufus Chetwood – A General History of the Stage
- John Cleland
  - The Case of the Unfortunate Bosavern Penlez
  - Memoirs of a Woman of Pleasure, or, Fanny Hill (unexpurgated, suppressed edition)
- John Gilbert Cooper – The Life of Socrates
- Denis Diderot – Lettre sur les aveugles à l'usage de ceux qui voient (Letter on the Blind for the Use of Those Who Can See)
- Henry Fielding
  - The History of Tom Jones, a Foundling
  - The True State of the Case of Bosavern Penlez (in reply to Cleland)
- Sarah Fielding – Remarks on 'Clarissa'
- David Hartley – Observations on Man, his Frame, his Duty, and his Expectations (psychology)
- Eliza Haywood – Dalinda (novel)
- Aaron Hill – Gideon
- John Jones – Free and Candid Disquisitions
- William Law – The Spirit of Prayer
- William Mason – Isis
- Lauritz de Thurah – Den Danske Vitruvius, volume II
- Henry St. John – Letters on the Spirit of Patriotism
- John Wesley – A Plain Account of the People Called Methodists
- Gilbert West – Odes of Pindar
- Diego de Torres Villarroel – Vida ejemplar y virtudes heroicas del venerable padre D. Jerónimo Abarrátegui y Figueroa

=== Children ===
- Sarah Fielding – The Governess, or The Little Female Academy

=== Drama ===
- Anonymous – Tittle Tattle (adaptation of Swift's Genteel and Ingenious Conversations)
- William Hawkins – Henry and Rosamund
- Aaron Hill – Meropé
- Samuel Johnson – Irene
- Moses Mendes – The Chaplet (musical, with music by William Boyce)
- Tobias Smollett – The Regicide
- Alexander Sumarokov – Khorev
- James Thomson – Coriolanus
- Voltaire – Nanine

=== Poetry ===
- William Collins – Ode Occasion'd by the death of Mr. Thomson
- Thomas Cooke – An Ode on Beauty
- Samuel Johnson – The Vanity of Human Wishes: The tenth satire of Juvenal, imitated
- Henry Jones – Poems

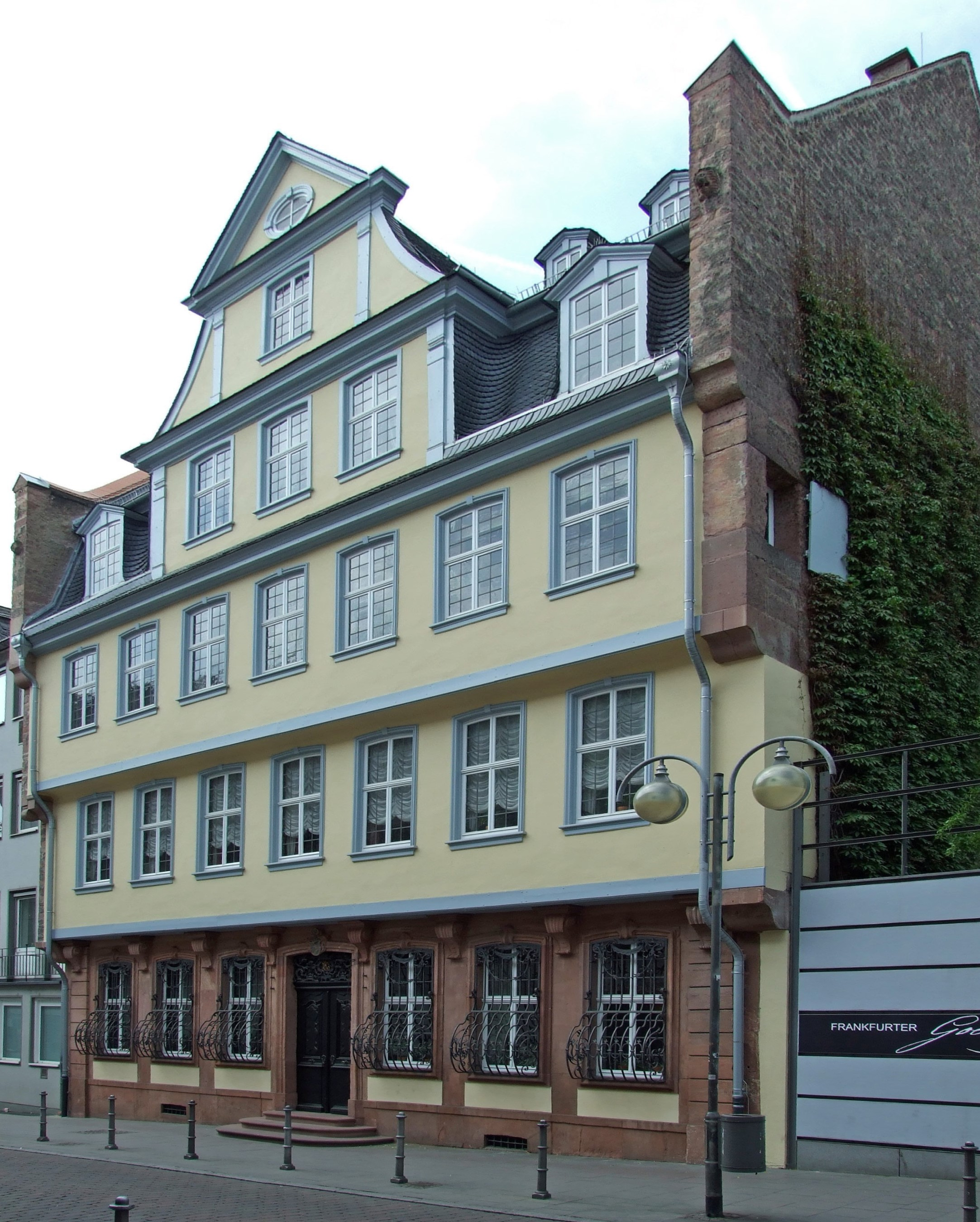
Goethe's birthplace in Frankfurt

== Births ==
- January 13 – Maler Müller (Friedrich Müller), German lyricist, dramatist and painter (died 1825)
- January 16 – Vittorio Alfieri, Italian dramatist and poet (died 1803)
- April 19 – Ōta Nanpo (Ōta Tan), Japanese comic poet and painter (died 1823)
- May 4 – Charlotte Turner Smith, English poet and novelist (died 1806)
- August 28 – Johann Wolfgang von Goethe, German poet, scholar and novelist (died 1832)
- December 19 – Alethea Lewis (Eugenia de Acton), English novelist (died 1827)
- December 25 – Samuel Jackson Pratt, English poet, playwright and novelist (died 1814)
- unknown date – Wang Yun, Chinese poet and playwright (died 1819)

== Deaths ==
- January 22 – Matthew Concanen, Irish poet, playwright and lawyer (born 1701)
- February 20 – Usher Gahagan, Irish-born classical scholar, poet and coiner, hanged
- May – Samuel Boyse, Irish poet (born 1702/3)
- June 18 – Ambrose Philips, English poet and politician (born 1675)
- August 13 – Johann Elias Schlegel, German critic and dramatic poet (born 1719)
- September 10 – Émilie du Châtelet, French scientific writer and translator (born 1706)
