= John Boswell (clergyman) =

English Anglican clergyman and writer (1698–1757)

John Boswell (Note: Sometimes spelt Bozwel. The date was of Boswell's death was initially inaccurately given as in 1756 within the 1886-published entry on him in the Dictionary of National Biography.) (23 January 1698 – June 1757) was an English writer and clergyman in the Church of England. Boswell's writings, including a two-volume response to John Jones's 1749 Free and Candid Disquisitions, were staunchly Tory and high church works. In his ministry, Boswell was assigned as the vicar of St Mary Magdalene, Taunton, and as prebendary at Wells Cathedral.

== Life ==
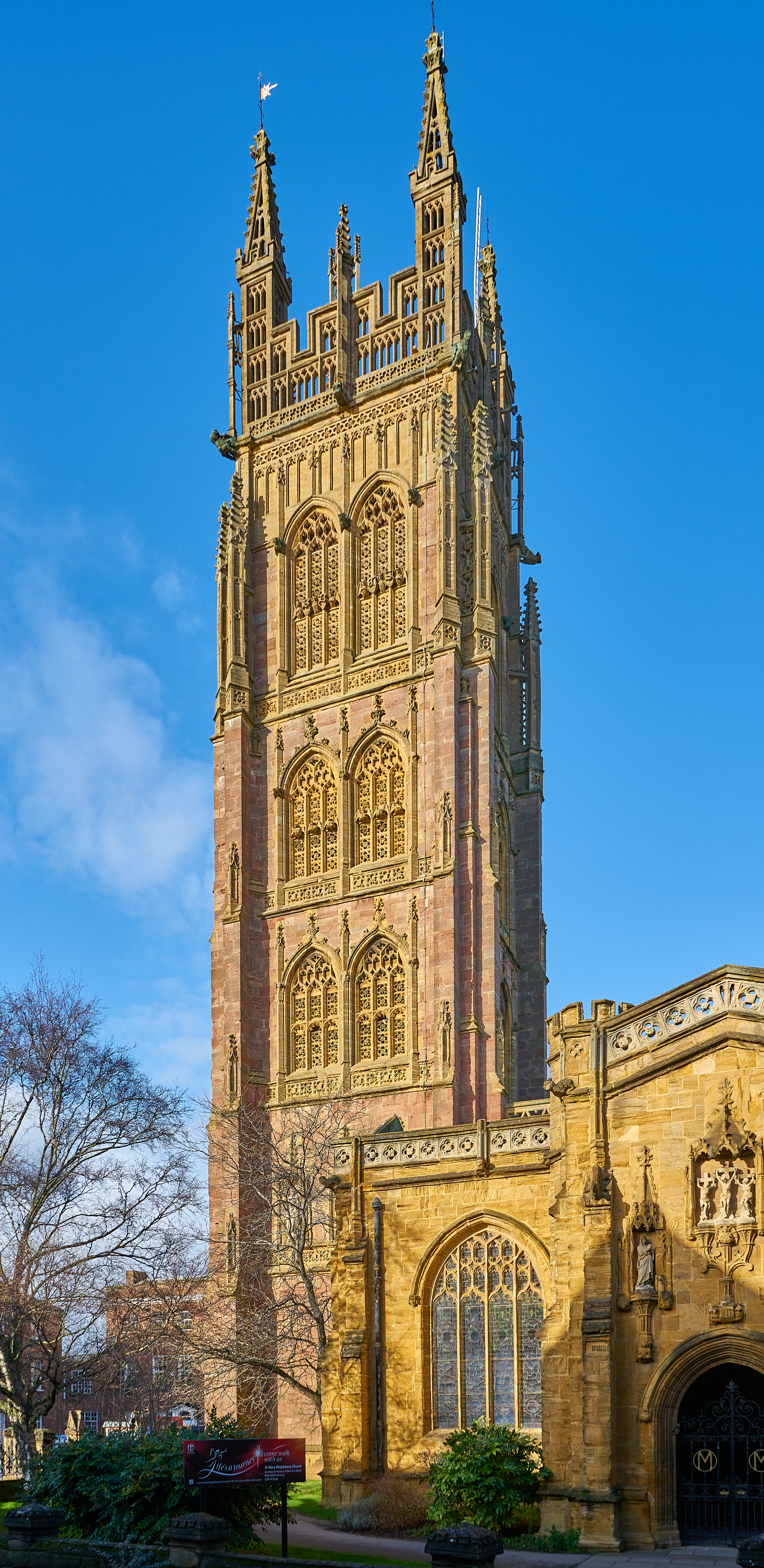
Tower of St Mary Magdalene, Taunton, where Boswell was vicar

John Boswell was born on 23 January 1698 in Dorchester, Dorset, to John Boswell of Puddletown, part of a Gloucestershire family. After attending school at Abbey Milton under George Marsh, Boswell matriculated into Brasenose College at the University of Oxford on 16 July 1715. Before Boswell graduated with a BA in 1720, he migrated to Balliol College and was Lord Kinnaird's tutor. He or another John Boswell was called to the bar at Lincoln's Inn on 29 May 1719. Ordained as a deacon in the Church of England in Oxford, Boswell was then ordained as a priest at Wells Cathedral. In 1727, Boswell was assigned as vicar of St Mary Magdalene, Taunton. He attained a MA from King's College of the University of Cambridge in 1732. In 1736, he became a prebendary of Wells Cathedral. The 2004 article on Boswell in the Oxford Dictionary of National Biography stated that he remained unmarried his entire life. However, a 1908 history of Boswell's Taunton parish described him as married to Sarah Mallock, the daughter-in-law of the "staunch Dissenter" John Mallock.

Published in two volumes between 1738 and 1743, Boswell's A Method of Study is among his works which reflect his strong Tory and high church attitudes. In 1750, Boswell published a critical response to John Jones's 1749 Free and Candid Disquisitions. (Note: The full titles of Boswell's 1750–1751 replies to Jones and his defenders were Remarks upon a treatise, intituled Free and candid disquisitions relating to the Church of England and Remarks upon a treatise, intituled, Free and candid disquisitions. Part the Second.) Jones's work had called for substantial reforms to the Church of England, particularly with the intent of comprehending Dissenters. (Note: Comprehension refers to affording latitude within the Church of England that allows Dissenters to remain practicing members within it.) Boswell's response opposed such reforms, offering praise for the Book of Common Prayer as adjacent to early Christian liturgical practices and defending its obligation that the Athanasian Creed be regularly recited. Boswell also approved of the Test Acts, which legally mandated clerical subscription to the doctrines of the Thirty-nine Articles. Boswell wrote a second response in 1751, replying to two works written to defend Jones from Boswell's criticisms: Francis Blackburne's An Apology for the Authors of Free and Candid Disquisitions and the anonymous, two-volume An Appeal to Common Reason and Candor.

Boswell wrote the two-volume The Case of the Royal Martyr Considered with Candour to defend Charles I, who was popularly celebrated by the likeminded Anglicans among Boswell's contemporaries. The works were specifically in reply to criticisms of Charles in George Coades's 1764 A Letter to a Clergyman Relating to his Sermon on 30 January and Thomas Birch's 1747 Enquiry. Boswell's defence of Charles largely borrowed from Thomas Carte's 1736 Life of James, Duke of Ormonde. The text countered Whigs claims that the Charles was a tyrant, particularly with regards to his negotiations with Irish Catholics. The volumes were published posthumously in 1758.

Boswell served as vicar at Taunton until 1756 and died in June 1757. He was interred at St Mary Magdalene, Taunton, with an inscription in the church commemorating him.

== Works ==
- The Privileges of the Restauration in Church and State: A Sermon Preach'd before the Worshipful the Mayor and Corporation of Taunton, on Friday, May 29, 1730. Exeter: E. Farley. 1730. On the English Civil War and the Stuart Restoration.
- A Method of Study; Or, an Useful Library. London. 1738. Recommendations "to assist the poor Clergyman in his studies, and to encourage the young Gentleman to look into books".
- Remarks upon a treatise, intituled Free and candid disquisitions relating to the Church of England In some letters to a worthy dignitary of the Church of Wells. Vol. I. London. 1750. A critical response to Free and Candid Disquisitions.
- Remarks upon a treatise, intituled Free and candid disquisitions relating to the Church of England. Vol. II. 1751.
- The Case of the Royal Martyr Considered with Candour; or, an Answer to Some Libels Lately Published In Prejudice to the Memory of that Unfortunate Prince. Vol. I & II. London: J. Richardson. 1758. A defence of King Charles I.
