= William Winstanley Hull =

English liturgist and hymnologist (1794–1873)

William Winstanley Hull (1794–1873) was an English barrister, writer, and hymnographer. Hull wrote in favour of ecclesiastical reforms to the Church of England, particularly its liturgy, in order to permit some Dissenters to reintegrate into the church. Alongside his vicar brother, William Winstanley Hull produced a petition on liturgical reform which was presented to the House of Lords. His effort to locate the original manuscript of the 1662 Book of Common Prayer is credited with leading to its discovery by Arthur Penrhyn Stanley. Hull's books of hymns, originally published anonymously, were later republished in his name during his lifetime.

== Biography ==
=== Early life ===
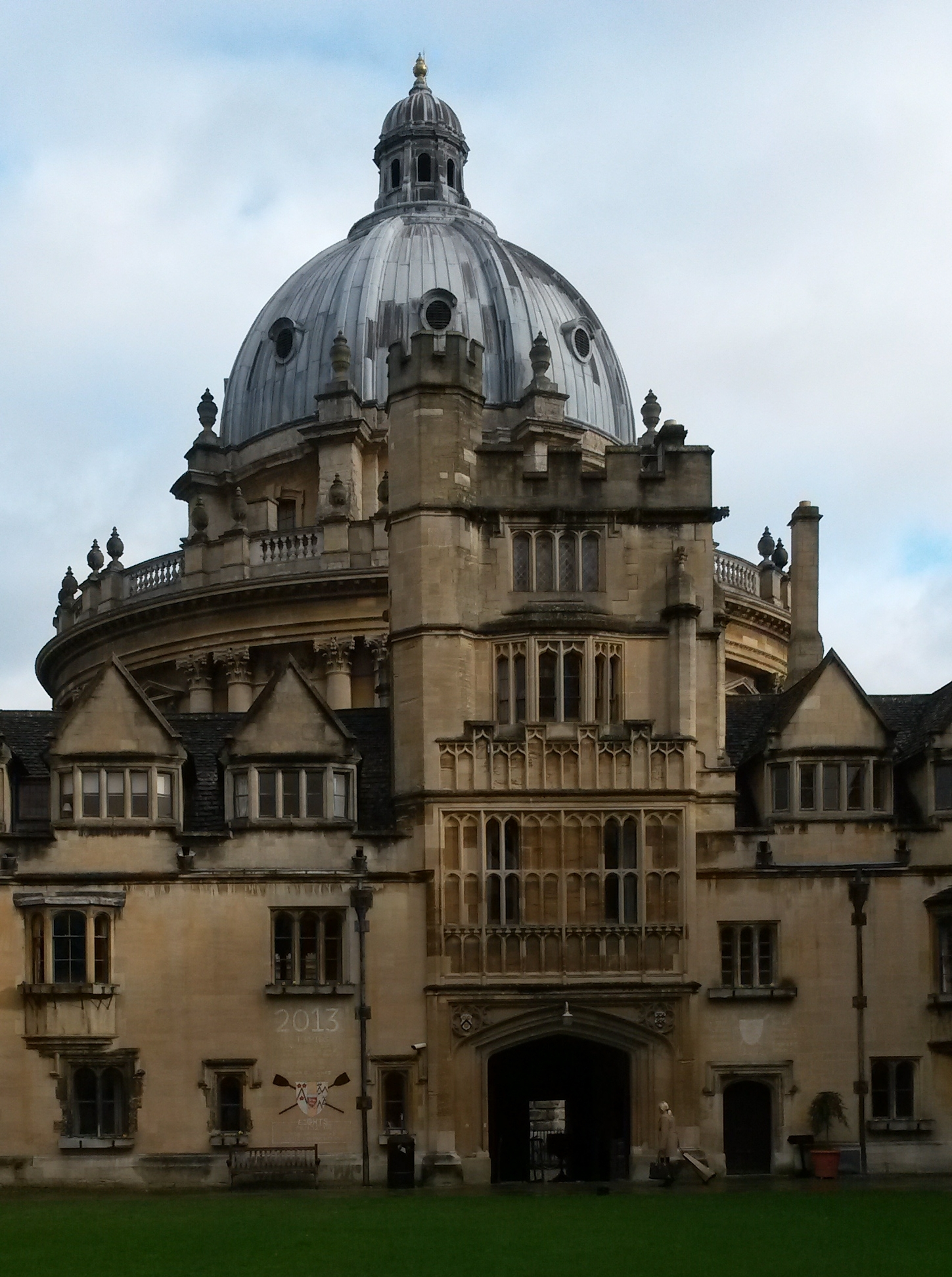
Brasenose College, Oxford, where Hull attended university and served as a fellow

William Winstanley Hull was born the eldest son of Sarah (née Winstanley) and John Hull on 15 March 1794 in Blackburn. Hull would ultimately have a brother, John, and two sisters. After studying under John Dawson, Hull enrolled at Brasenose College at the University of Oxford in 1811. Elected a fellow in 1816, he would leave the fellowship when he married Frances Wilson in Manchester Cathedral on 27 December 1820. On 16 June 1820, Hull was called to the bar at Lincoln's Inn. Despite his departure from Oxford, Hull remained involved in its affairs and maintained lifelong close friendships with fellow Oxford students Thomas Arnold, John Taylor Coleridge, and Richard Whately.

=== Career ===
Following the 1815 victory over the French, popular sentiment began to shift against Tory rule in Britain. This precipitated growing support for both ecclesiastical and secular reforms. In 1828, Hull had published a pamphlet, (Note: Hull's 1828 pamphlet was entitled An inquiry concerning the means and expedience of proposing and making any changes in the canons, articles, and liturgy, or in any of the laws affecting the interests of the Church of England.) among the earliest 19th-century articulations of liturgical reform in the Church of England. Alongside a similar pamphlet by Edward Berens also published in 1828, Hull's proposals were described by the High Church magazine The British Critic as "pilot balloons" in determining public opinion on reforming the liturgy. (Note: Thomas Arnold published Principles of Church Reform in 1833, also arguing for the comprehension of Dissenters with the exclusion of Catholics, Quakers, and Unitarians.)

Hull's proposals treated the American Episcopal Church's 1789 prayer book as a foundation for revising the 1662 English Book of Common Prayer. Hull's proposals for reform to the ordinal were heavily founded in the 1789 American prayer book, with him submitting its ordination rite for priests as an alternative. He also wished to alter the statements made by ordinands regarding what understanding of the Bible and remove suggestion that knowing Latin was a prerequisite for ministry. He drew upon John Jones's 1749 Free and Candid Disquisitions in proposing that the three Sunday morning services—Morning Prayer, the Litany, and Holy Communion—be combined into a single, shorter rite. Hull's liturgical proposals also favoured the removal of all creeds from daily offices, with some exceptions for the Apostles' Creed.

Hull and Berens were well received: between 1828 and 1840, many other liturgical proposals appeared, generally matching their Hull and Berens in favouring liberal reforms that permitted the comprehension of Dissenters. (Note: Comprehension refers to affording latitude within the Church of England that allows Dissenters to remain practicing members within it.) Historian Ronald Jasper, while holding that these early 19th-century liturgical reform efforts were lacking in liturgiology, noted that the 1928 proposed prayer book's failure would justify Hull and Berens in their suggestions for "ordered liturgical experiment".

In 1829, Hull's High Toryism and staunch Protestant leanings saw him join a committee formed by Sir Robert Inglis to oppose Robert Peel returning to the House of Commons as one of the MPs from the Oxford University constituency. The same year, Hull published a pamphlet in which he opposed allowing Catholics and Jews from serving in Parliament. Hull wrote a pamphlet in support of Renn Hampden in 1836, opposing Tractarianism. However, in 1845, Hull wrote against the public humiliation of Catholic convert and Tractarian William George Ward. With his brother, John, the vicar of St Chad's Church, Poulton-le-Fylde–William Winstanley created a petition for liturgical reform which was presented to the House of Lords in 1840 by Whately, the Archbishop of Dublin.

In 1848, Hull wrote a study entitled "Inquiry after the original Books of Common Prayer" for his Occasional Papers on Church Matters. His search for the 1662 prayer book's original manuscript is credited with leading to Arthur Penrhyn Stanley discovering the document at Westminster Hall. Hull also published two books of original hymns and prayers. These were first published anonymously in 1827 and 1832; he was named as the author when they were republished as A Collection of Prayers for Household Use, with some Hymns and Other Poems in 1852.

=== Later life and death ===
Hull's first wife Frances died in 1849. Hull married his second wife, also named Frances, on 11 September 1850; she died in 1853. He was married a final time on 4 July 1861 to Eliza Matilda, who would outlive him. Hull's final residence was at The Knowle, Hazelwood, Derbyshire, from which he supported the liturgical reforms forwarded by Lord Ebury. He died on 28 August 1873 in Hazelwood; he was interred in the village churchyard. A memorial to William Winstanley Hull and other members of his family is located on the interior south wall of St Chad's Church, Poulton-le-Fylde.

== Selected bibliography ==
- An Inquiry Concerning the Means and Expedience of Proposing and Making Any Changes in the Canons, Articles, Or Liturgy, Or in Any of the Laws Affecting the Interests of the Church of England. Oxford; London: J. Parker; C. and J. Rivington. 1828.
- The Disuse of the Athanasian Creed Advisable in the Present State of the United Church of England and Ireland. London: J. Parker. 1831.
- Thoughts on Church Reform. London: B. Fellowes. 1832.
- A Collection of Prayers for Household Use, with Some Hymns and Other Poems (2nd ed.). London: Seeleys. 1852.
