= William Robertson (Irish priest) =

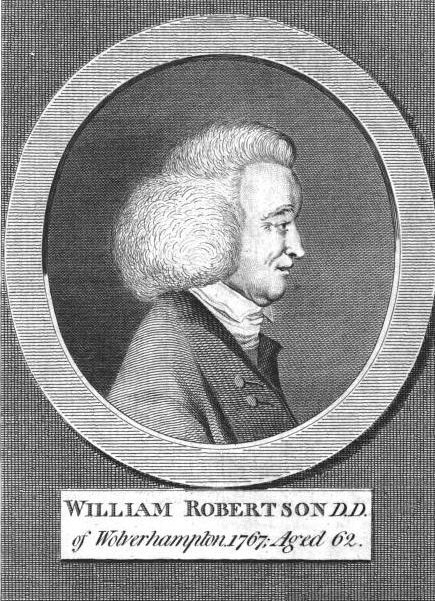
William Robertson, 1783 engraving from the Gentleman's Magazine

William Robertson (1705–1783) was an Irish clergyman, known as a theological writer and schoolmaster. Theophilus Lindsey wrote of Robertson as "the father of unitarian nonconformity".

== Early life ==
He was born in Dublin on 16 October 1705. His father was a linen manufacturer, of Scottish birth, who had married in England Diana Allen. In 1717 he went to school at Dublin under Francis Hutcheson. On 4 March 1723 he matriculated at the University of Glasgow, graduated M.A. on 29 April 1724, and studied divinity under John Simson.

== Expulsion from university ==
In 1725 came a crisis in a long-standing dispute between the Glasgow students and John Stirling, the principal. Stirling had appointed Hugh Montgomery of Hartfield as rector, ignoring the students' right to elect. Robertson and William Campbell of Mamore (younger brother of John Campbell) presented to Stirling a petition signed by some sixty students, demanding a university meeting for 1 March to elect a rector according to the statute. On its rejection, the petitioners went in a body on 1 March to Montgomery's house, when Robertson read a protest against his authority.

Robertson was cited before the senatus, and after some days' trial was expelled from the university on 4 March. He went to London for redress, applying himself to John Campbell, 2nd Duke of Argyll, who referred him to his younger brother, Archibald, Earl of Islay. Islay obtained a royal commission (appointed 31 August 1726), which visited the university of Glasgow, rescinded (4 October 1726) the act expelling Robertson, restored the students' right of electing the rector, and recovered the right of the university to nominate the Snell exhibitioners at Balliol College, Oxford. The commission concluded its work by issuing (19 September 1727) an act for the regulation of the university.

== Anglican clergyman ==
Islay introduced Robertson to Benjamin Hoadly, and Hoadly to William Wake, archbishop of Canterbury, and to Josiah Hort, then bishop of Ferns and Leighlin; Hort introduced him to the lord chancellor, Peter King, 1st Baron King. Robertson prepared to take Anglican orders, attending some Gresham College lectures, and read in public libraries. Towards the end of 1727 he went to Ireland with John Hoadly, the newly appointed bishop of Ferns and Leighlin. Wake also recommended him to Timothy Goodwin, archbishop of Cashel.

Robertson was ordained deacon by John Hoadly on 14 January 1728, and appointed curate of Tullow, County Carlow. On 10 November 1729 he was ordained priest, and was presented (11 Nov.) by Carteret, the lord lieutenant, to the rectories of Rathvilly, County Carlow, and Kilranelagh, County Wicklow. In 1738 he obtained in addition the vicarages of Rathmore and Straboe, and the perpetual curacy of Rahil, County Carlow.

In 1743 Robertson went to live in Dublin for the sake of his children's education. Here he acted as curate of St. Luke's. He returned to Rathvilly in 1748.

== Later life ==
In October 1759 Robertson came across Free and Candid Disquisitions published anonymously in 1749 by John Jones; after reading it he felt that he could not renew his declaration of assent and consent to the contents of the Book of Common Prayer. His bishop, Richard Robinson, offered him the rectories of Tullowmoy and Ballyquillane, Queen's County. He declined them in a letter (15 January 1760).

Robertson ceased to read the Athanasian Creed, and omitted other parts of the services. Under pressure, Robertson resigned his benefices in 1764.

In August 1767 Robertson moved to London, where he attracted some notice. The mastership of Wolverhampton grammar school was bestowed on him by the Merchant Taylors' Company; the salary was £70 a year, out of which for five years a pension of £40 was paid to a predecessor. He was supported, often anonymously, by friends.

Robertson, in the Attempt, disclaimed Arian or Socinian views; his subsequent adoption of unitarian views was due to the influence of Joseph Priestley and Theophilus Lindsey. He was a member in 1771–2 of the committee for promoting a petition to parliament for clerical relief from subscription. In April 1778 he agreed to become Lindsey's colleague at Essex Street Chapel, London, and had begun preparations to move from Wolverhampton. A threatened prosecution for teaching without license led him to remain.

Robertson died at Wolverhampton, of gout in the stomach, on 20 May 1783, and was buried in the churchyard of St. John's.

== Works ==
Robertson wrote verses to his wife in the Gentleman's Magazine, July 1736, p. 416. Unable to collect the tithe of agistment (pasturage for dry cattle), Robertson published A Scheme for utterly abolishing the present heavy and vexatious Tax of Tithe, which went through several editions; his proposal was to commute the tithe into a land tax. This pamphlet attracted the attention of Charles Cathcart, 8th Lord Cathcart, who appointed Robertson his chaplain.

In 1766 Robertson published anonymously An Attempt to explain the Words, Reason, Substance. This was written earlier. He describes himself as "a presbyter of the church of England", says nothing of his resignation but only of his refusal of further preferment, and propounds the plan of a comprehensive establishment, based on a subscription to the Bible only, and with a service book silent on all controverted points. To an edition issued in March 1767 is appended the letter of 1760 signed "W. Robertson"; another issue, with the same appendix, is dated 1768. Robertson presented a copy to the University of Glasgow, and received from the senatus the degree of D.D. (21 January 1768). Philip Skelton, after criticising the 'Attempt' from an evangelical point of view in his Observations, offered Robertson a provision for life under his own roof, or a separate income at his option; the offer was declined, but an intimate correspondence was maintained till Robertson's death. The Attempt was also answered in a Confutation (Dublin, 1769, 2 vols.) by Smyth Loftus.

John Disney assigned to him Eleutheria, 1768, a poem dedicated to Catharine Macaulay, and stated that in 1767–8 he contributed to the Monthly Review.

== Family ==
Robertson married, in 1728, Elizabeth (d. 1758), daughter of Major William Baxter, and had twenty-one children, but survived them all, leaving only a grandson.
