= John Hull (physician) =

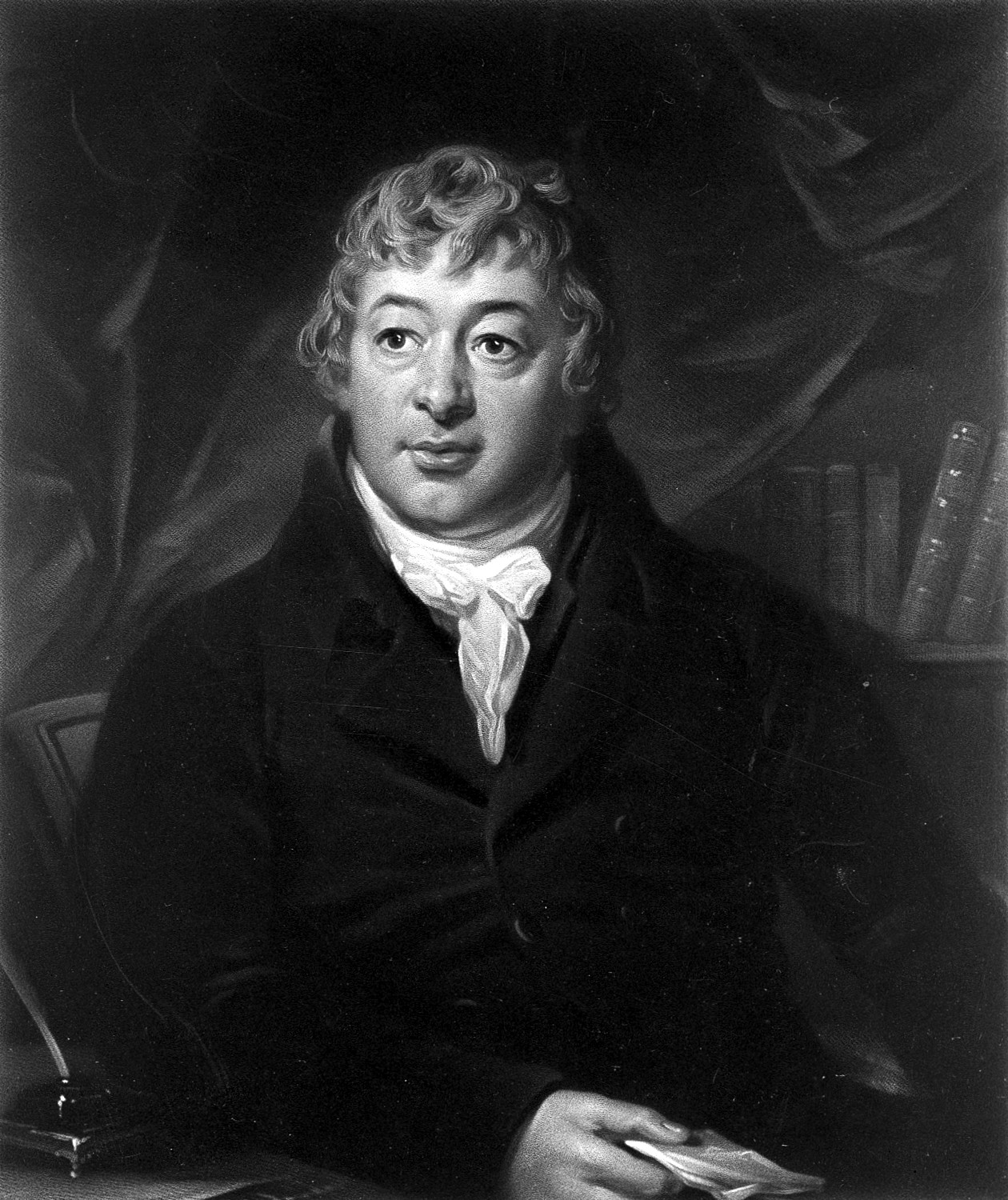
John Hull, 1808 engraving

John Hull (1761–1843) was a medical doctor and obstetrician in Manchester during the late 18th and early 19th centuries. He played an active role within the city's medical profession, and engaged in debate on issues of the day. He established himself as a physician and became prominent in the field of obstetrics.

== Early life and education ==
John Hull was born in 1761 at Poulton, Lancashire, the eldest son of John Hull (1725?-1768) who himself was an apothecary and surgeon. Hull was orphaned at quite an early age and at sixteen became apprenticed to a Mr Lancaster, a surgeon, man midwife and apothecary in Blackburn. It was here that he first began to attend lying-in cases, which would later become the most prominent part of his career. Upon completion of his apprenticeship Hull travelled to London to qualify with the Corporation of Surgeons, which he succeeded in doing in 1784. The student notes amongst his surviving manuscripts indicate that he studied medicine at St Thomas’ Hospital, London for a period of at least one year during 1783-1784, if not longer, studying under prominent physicians such as George Fordyce (1736-1802) and Henry Cline (1750-1827). After qualifying in 1784 he returned to Blackburn where he went into partnership with his former master Mr Lancaster, and his success there enabled him to buy the practice. In 1791 he married the sister of Dr William Winstanley. Hull went on to pursue further medical studies at Leiden, Netherlands where he graduated with his MD on 18 May 1792, with his dissertation being entitled ‘De Catharticis’.

== Career in Manchester ==
After returning to the UK he is known to have continued to practise in Blackburn for a time before coming to Manchester in 1796 and by 1797 at least is known to have been practising from 8 St James’ Square. Later sources show him to be registered at 30 Mosley Street. His move to Manchester was in part predicated by the lack of a lying-in hospital in Blackburn, hindering the development of his interests in obstetrics. In Manchester he established himself as a highly respected obstetrician and engaged in active debate about practice, in particular where his belief that caesarean sections were sometimes necessary and useful was concerned. Supported in his view by the staff of the Lying-in Hospital, now St Mary’s Hospital, he was however criticised by staff at the Manchester Royal Infirmary, in particular William Simmons, who published an attack on the operation. Hull in turn published a response, listed below, and the debate continued for several years.

Hull joined the staff of the Manchester Lying-in hospital in 1804 as well as becoming part of its medical committee. A year later in 1805 the senior post of physician was created at the hospital and immediately awarded to Hull who held the post until his retirement in 1837. He also worked closely with Manchester’s other medical establishments and he is listed as the consulting physician to the Institution for Curing Diseases of the Eye, now the Manchester Royal Eye Hospital. In addition he is believed to have been involved in 1819 in the founding of the Manchester and Salford Lock Hospital and Dispensary for unfortunate women, later St Luke’s Hospital, alongside Joseph Jordan, William Simmons, William Brigham and Michael Stewart. The catalyst of the Lock Hospital’s foundation had been the fact that the Manchester Royal Infirmary would not accept venereal cases, much to the admonishment of several of the city’s physicians.

== Professional societies ==
Hull was admitted an Extra-Licentiate of the Royal College of Physicians in June 1806, and a Licentiate in June 1819. He was also involved in local associations being an active member of the Manchester Literary and Philosophical Society, which at the time was the only real place in which Manchester physicians and other members of the medical profession could meet and discuss professional issues. It was here that Hull engaged in debates over the Caesarean Section. He even published a defense of the procedure amid the controversies over its risks. Hull was co-secretary for many years before being elected president in 1809. He, however, stood down form this role fairly swiftly in favour of Thomas Henry, one of the Society’s co-founders, who was soon re-elected. The need for a dedicated medical society was met some years later and Hull headed up the initiative to establish the Manchester Medical Society in 1834 and notably served as their first president from 1834 to 1838. Upon its foundation Hull presented a large number of books to the Society to help establish what would eventually become a very large library.

In addition he was a keen botanist, a role which he was well known for and is evidenced through some of his publications and his surviving manuscripts. He was also a fellow of the Linnaean Society.

== Death and family ==
Hull died on 17 March 1843 at Tavistock Square, London, the house of his eldest son, William Winstanley Hull (1794-1873) who became a noted liturgical writer and hymnologist. In addition Hull was the grandfather in law to the writer Edith Maud Hull (1880-1947) and the great grandfather of writer Cecil Winstanley Hull (d.1980).

== Main works ==
His main publications include:

- ‘A Remarkable Case of Numerous Births, with Observations. By Maxwell Garthshore, M. D. F. R. S. and A. S. in a Letter to Sir Joseph Banks, Bart. P. R. S.’, Philosophical Transactions of the Royal Society of London Vol.77, 1787, pp. 334–358. Co-authored with Maxwell Garthshore and Gilbert Blane.
- A defence of the cesarean operation, with observations on embryulcia, and the section of the symphysis pubis, addressed to Mr. W. Simmons, of Manchester (Manchester: R & W Dean, 1798)
- Observations on Mr. Simmons's Detection (Manchester, 1799)
- The British Flora or A Linnean arrangement of British plants, with their generic and specific characters, select synonyms, English names, places of growth, duration, times of flowering, and references to figures. (Manchester, 1799)
- An essay on phlegmatia dolens, including an account of the symptoms, causes and cure of peritonitis puerperalis & conjunctiva, &c &c (Manchester, 1800)
- Elements of botany. : Illustrated by sixteen engravings (Manchester, 1800)
- Two Memoirs on the Caesarian Operation, by M. de Bandelocque, sen. Professor of Midwifery, in the School of Medicine at Paris. Translated from the French; with a Preface, Notes, an Appendix, and Six Engravings (Manchester, 1801)

Approximately 41 of Hull's original manuscripts survive as part of a larger archival collection known as the Manchester Medical Manuscript's Collection held by the Special Collections team at the University of Manchester's Main Library. The manuscripts were donated to the University in 1934 and include many volumes of his lecture notes from when he was a student, a small number of case books from when he was a practising physician, extract books, drafts of prospective yet unpublished publications, and some of his botany books.
