= Francis Blackburne (priest) =

English Anglican churchman (1705-1787)

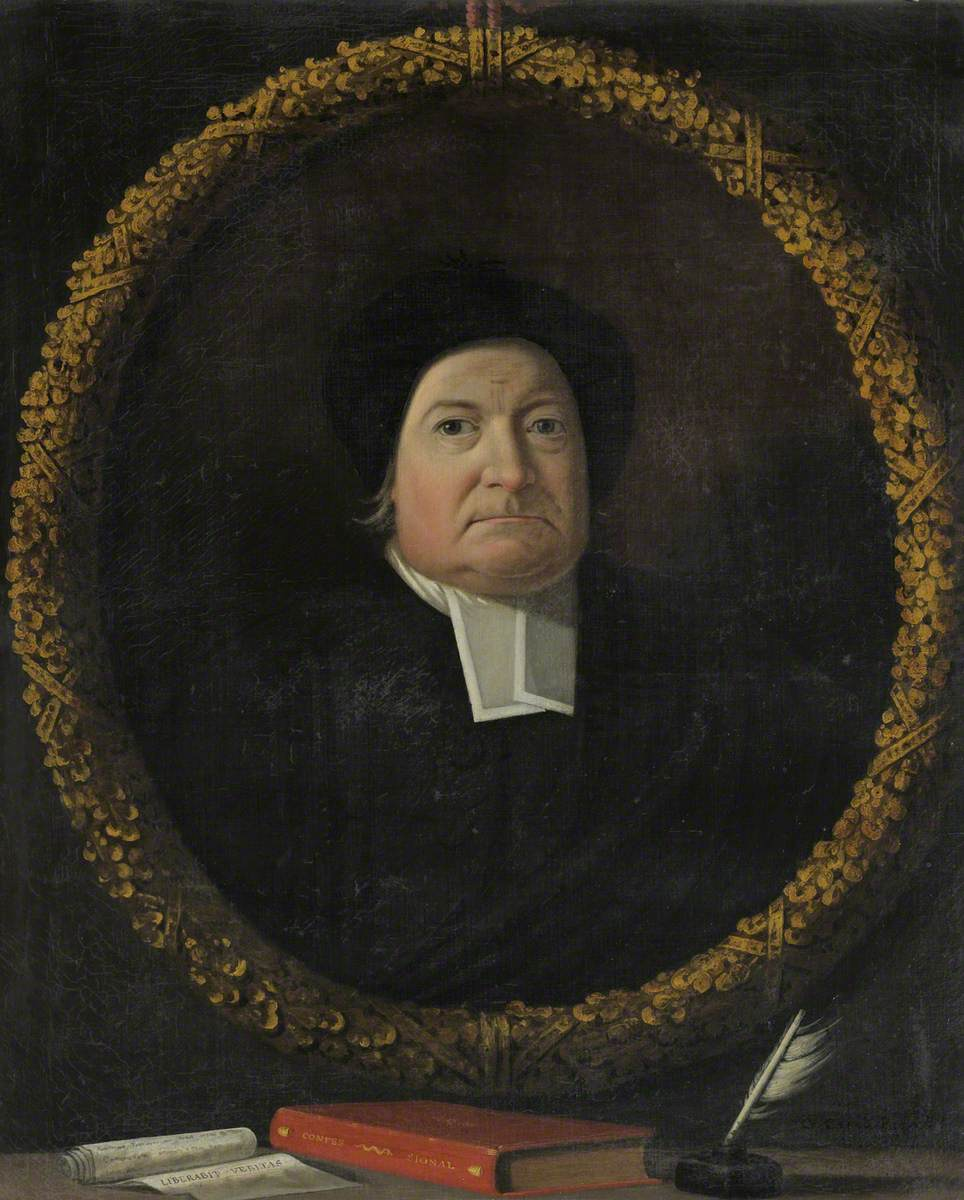
Francis Blackburne, 1777 painting

Francis Blackburne (9 June 1705 – 7 August 1787) was an English Anglican clergyman, archdeacon of Cleveland and an activist against the requirement of subscription to the Thirty Nine Articles.

== Life ==
Blackburne was born at Richmond, Yorkshire, on 9 June 1705. He was educated at Kendal, Hawkshead, and Sedbergh School, and was admitted in May 1722 at Catherine Hall, Cambridge. A follower of John Locke's politics and theology, he was refused a college fellowship; he was ordained deacon 17 March 1728, and became "conduct" of his college.

Leaving his college, Blackburne lived with an uncle in Yorkshire till 1739, when he was ordained priest to take the rectory of Richmond in Yorkshire, which had been promised to him on the first vacancy. He resided there till his death. He was collated to the archdeaconry of Cleveland in July 1750, and in August 1750 to the prebend of Bilton, by Archbishop Matthew Hutton. His principles prevented any further preferment, and he decided never again to subscribe to the Thirty-nine Articles.

In 1772 a meeting was held at the Feathers Tavern, and a petition signed by 200 persons for giving effect to Blackburne's proposal in The Confessional. It was rejected by 217 to 71 after a speech in condemnation by Edmund Burke, published in his Works.Theophilus Lindsey, who married a stepdaughter of Blackburne's, and John Disney, who married his eldest daughter, joined in this agitation, and both of them later left the church of England to become Unitarians. Blackburne was said to sympathise with their views but to have declined an offer to succeed the nonconformist Samuel Chandler at the Old Jewry meeting house at a salary of £400.

In 1787 Blackburne performed his thirty-eighth visitation in Cleveland, and died, 7 August 1787, a few weeks later.

== Works ==
In 1749, vicar of Alconbury John Jones published his Free and Candid Disquisitions, proposing modifications of the church services and ritual with a view to meeting difficulties of the latitudinarians. Blackburne read the book in manuscript, but denied that he had any share in the composition. He defended it in an apology (1750). In 1752 he published anonymously an attack on Bishop Joseph Butler's well-known charge (1751), called A Serious Inquiry into the Use and Importance of External Religion, and accusing Butler of deficient Protestantism. This was first printed with his name in 1767 in the Pillars of Priestcraft and Orthodoxy shaken, a collection by Richard Baron. He supported the semi-materialist theory of the sleep of the soul of his college friend Edmund Law, in a tract called No Proof in the Scriptures of an Intermediate State, 1755; and in 1758 he argued against the casuistry which would permit subscription to the articles to be made with latitude of meaning, in Remarks on the Rev. Dr. Powell's Sermon in Defence of Subscriptions.

The debate that followed led to Blackburne's major work, The Confessional, or a full and free inquiry into the right, utility, and success of establishing confessions of faith and doctrine in protestant churches. The manuscript had remained unpublished for some years, when a friend who had seen it mentioned it to the republican Thomas Hollis, through whom Andrew Millar the bookseller was introduced to the author, and published the book anonymously in May 1766; a second edition appeared in June 1767. The Confessional argues from William Chillingworth's principle—"The Bible is the religion of protestants"—that a profession of belief in the scriptures as the word of God, and a promise to teach the people from the scriptures, should be the sole pledges demanded from Protestant pastors. This is supported by historical considerations, and the device of lax interpretation of the articles is denounced as a casuistical artifice of William Laud's in defence of Arminianism. A controversy arose. A list of the pamphlets is given in the Gentleman's Magazine and in a Short View of the Controversy (1773, by John Disney). A third edition of The Confessional appeared in 1770.

On Disney's secession from the Church of England, Blackburne drew up a paper called An Answer to the Question, Why are you not a Socinian? He declares his belief in the divinity of Christ, though he confesses to certain doubts and guards his assertions.

Blackburne had worked on a life of Martin Luther, but abandoned it to write the memoirs of his friend Thomas Hollis. These appeared in 1780. His Works, Theological and Miscellaneous, including some pieces not before printed, with a memoir, were published by his son Francis in 1804, in seven volumes; The Confessional makes up the fifth volume. The third volume contains A Historical View of the Controversy concerning an Intermediate State, of which the first edition appeared in 1765, and the second in 1772. It brought him into collision with Bishop William Warburton, and prompted his Remarks on Dr. Warburton's Account of the Sentiments of the Jews concerning the Soul. The fourth volume of the Works contains his charges, as archdeacon, in 1765, 1766, 1767, 1769, 1771, and 1773. They show that he was not prepared to extend full toleration to Catholics. The other volumes contain miscellaneous pamphlets.

== Family ==
In 1744 Blackburne married a widow, Hannah, formerly Hotham, who had (in 1737) married Joshua Elsworth; she died 20 August 1799. He left four children:

- Jane, married to John Disney;
- Francis, vicar of Brignall;
- Sarah, married to the Rev. John Hall, vicar of Chew Magna; and
- William, a physician in London.

A son, Thomas, a physician, died, aged thirty-three, in 1782.
