= James Freeman (clergyman) =

American Unitarian preacher (1759–1835)

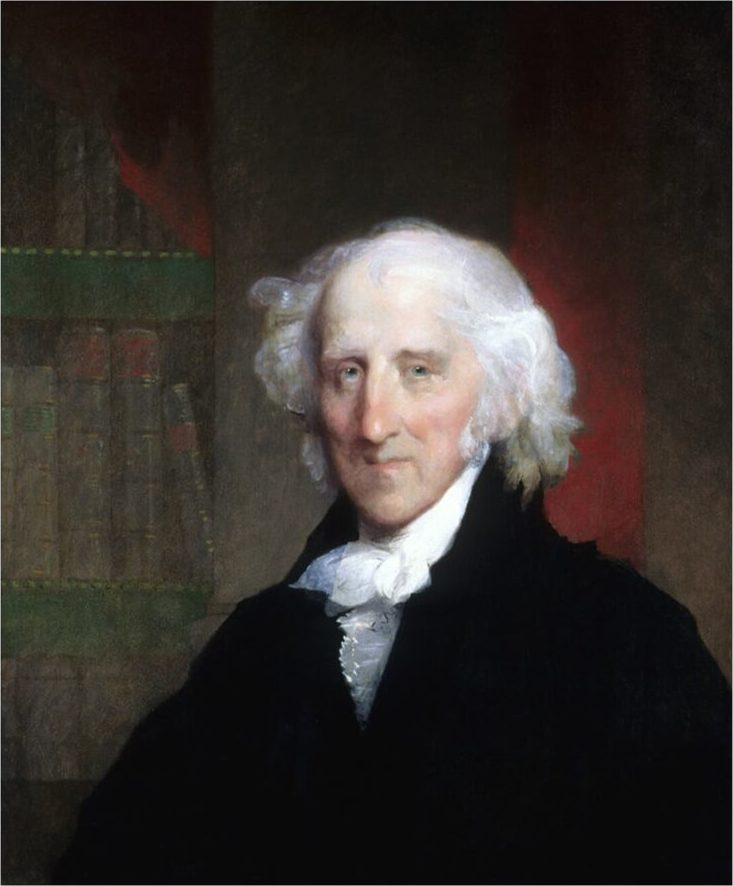
- Portrait by Gilbert Stuart, c. 1820–1828
- Born: April 22, 1759; Charlestown, Province of Massachusetts Bay, British America
- Died: November 14, 1835 (aged 76); Newton, Massachusetts, U.S.
- Burial place: Newton Cemetery
- Education: Harvard University
- Known for: First avowed Unitarian minister in the United States
- Church: Unitarian
- Ordained: November 1787
- Congregations served: King's Chapel

Signature
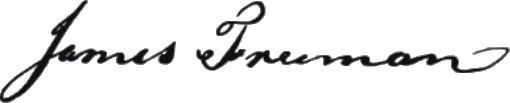

James Freeman (April 22, 1759 – November 14, 1835) was an American Unitarian clergyman and writer, "noteworthy as the first avowed preacher of Unitarianism in the United States". After graduating Harvard and becoming pastor of King's Chapel in Boston, Freeman's revised Book of Common Prayer was adopted by the congregation. This and Freeman's later ordination are credited as the origins of Unitarianism in New England. Later receiving a D.D. from Harvard Divinity School, he was also a founding member of the Massachusetts Historical Society.

== Early life ==
James Freeman was born in Charlestown, Massachusetts, on April 22, 1759. After attending the Boston Latin Grammar School, graduated from Harvard University with an A.B. in 1777, and in 1782 became a reader at King's Chapel. Though his education at Harvard had been interrupted by the American Revolutionary War, Freeman could read French, Italian, Spanish, and Portuguese and was considered a scholar.

== Ministry ==
=== Arrival at King's Chapel ===
In 1783, Freeman was invited to become a lay reader at King's Chapel. Here, Freeman wished to use the modifications to the 1662 Book of Common Prayer that had been adopted at Trinity Church and was given the discretion to not say the Athanasian Creed. After completing the six-month term as reader, the King's Chapel congregation voted to make Freeman their pastor. Freeman differed from many of his Unitarian-minded contemporaries, who were Congregationalists that approached Unitarian teaching through Arianism. Instead, Freeman was in regular correspondence with English Unitarians such as Theophilus Lindsey and first adopted Socinianism. William Hazlitt, an English Unitarian that had traveled to the United States, soon convinced Freeman and "several respectable ministers" to cease reciting Trinitarian doxologies.

=== Prayer book ===
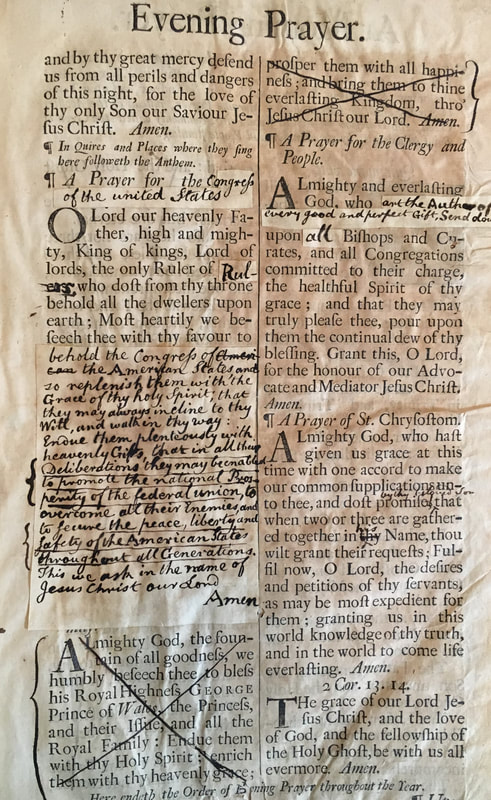
Alterations by Freeman to the 1662 prayer book's Evening Prayer office

In 1774, Lindsey had created a revised Book of Common Prayer based on alterations made by Samuel Clarke in the latter's copy of the 1662 prayer book. Lindsey would use this liturgy at his Essex Street Chapel, the first Unitarian congregation in England. Hazlitt had been among Lindsey's congregants and gave a copy of Lindsey's prayer book to Freeman in 1784.

Then 24 years old, Freeman pushed the King's Chapel congregation to adopt their own revision of the 1662 prayer book. The congregation's proprietors voted on February 20, 1785, to create a seven-man committee to report on Freeman's alterations. Leaning on Clarke's and Lindsey's revisions, Freeman worked with Hazlitt to create his own Nontrinitarian alterations to the prayer book. While he was optimistic that the congregation would adopt his revision, Freeman wrote to his father before the vote, saying that he would resign from his position as pastor should the vote fail. On June 19, Freeman's prayer book was adopted by a 20-7 majority, with three of the opposing votes coming from proprietors that had exclusively worshipped at Trinity Church since 1776.

Freeman hoped that the new liturgy would have a broad appeal, writing in its preface that "no Christian, it is supposed, can take offence at, or find his conscience wounded" by the 1785 prayer book's contents. However, his liturgy was met with public rancor. Among its critics was William White of the newly founded Episcopal Church, who disapproved of the congregation's independent prayer book adoption and its Nontrinitarian theology.

=== Ordination and independent congregation ===
Following the adoption of his prayer book, Freeman was still not ordained. The congregation decided against approaching the Church of England to perform such an ordination due in part to its requirement that ordinands swear loyalty to the king. As the congregation also desired to remain episcopal, a Presbyterian ordination was rejected. Freeman applied for ordination in the Episcopal Church in 1786. He was rejected by Bishops Samuel Seabury and Samuel Provoost after Freeman refused to assent to the Episcopalians' own prayer book and its Trinitarian theology. With this rejection, the congregation decided to ordain Freeman themselves. The ordination was performed in November 1787, with the senior church warden performing the laying on of hands. With this and their prayer book, King's Chapel became the first Unitarian church in the United States.

Samuel J. May wrote that Freeman was isolated during his early ministry through his exclusion from the Episcopal Church and poor integration with nearby Congregationalist ministers who were "embarrassed" by Freeman's use of a prayer book and liturgies. However, May recalled that Freeman enjoyed a "cordial friendship" with Joseph Eckley, the latter of whose congregation at Old South Meeting House temporarily displaced to King's Chapel during renovations in 1807 or 1808. Freeman retired from ministry at King's Chapel in 1826. King's Chapel continues to worship according to a revised version of Freeman's prayer book, presently in its ninth edition first published in 1986.

== Personal life and death ==
On July 17, 1788, Freeman married a woman named Martha, the widow of Boston merchant Samuel Clarke. While Freeman never had any children, Martha had a son from her prior marriage and Freeman raised James Freeman Clarke as his grandson.

Freeman, a member of the local school committee and fellow of the American Academy of Arts and Sciences, contributed to the periodicals and collections of the Massachusetts Historical Society, which he helped found. Freeman also served as the society's first recording secretary from 1793 to 1812. A teacher at Boston Latin Grammar School, Freeman received an honorary A.M. from Brown University in 1790 and a D.D. from Harvard Divinity School in 1811. Freeman died on November 14, 1835, in Newton, Massachusetts. Freeman and his wife had lived in Newton during his retirement. Freeman was buried in Newton Cemetery, with his wife interred in the family tomb there upon her death at 86 years old in 1841.
