= Usher Gahagan =

Irish classical scholar

Usher Gahagan (died 1749), was an Irish classical scholar.

Gahagan belonged to a good family of Westmeath, Ireland; was educated at Trinity College, Dublin, but took no degree, and then proceeded to study for the Irish bar. His parents had brought him up as a Protestant, but he was converted in youth to Roman Catholicism, and was thus prevented from being called to the bar. He soon married a rich heiress, whom he treated very cruelly, and a separation followed. His relatives were alienated by his conduct, and he came to London, where he tried to make a livelihood out of his classical scholarship.

He edited in Brindley's beautiful edition of the classics the works of Horace, Cornelius Nepos, Sallust, Juvenal, Persius, Virgil, and Terence, all published in 1744; Quintus Curtius Rufus in 1746; Catullus, Propertius, and Tibullus, issued in 1749. He also translated into good Latin verse Pope's ‘Essay on Criticism’ (‘Tentamen de re critica’), which appeared in 1747 with a Latin dedication to the Earl of Chesterfield, and a poem descriptive of the earl's recent reception in Dublin as lord-lieutenant.

Gahagan fell into very bad company in London. A compatriot, Hugh Coffey, suggested to him a plan for making money by filing coins or ‘diminishing the current coin of the realm.’ Another Irishman, of some education, Terence Connor, who is variously described as Gahagan's servant or lodger, was introduced into at the end of 1748. Coffey turned informer, and Gahagan and Connor were arrested in a public-house at Chalk Farm early in January 1748–9. The trial took place at the Old Bailey on Monday, 16 Jan. 1748–9, and both were convicted on Coffey's evidence. While awaiting execution in Newgate, Gahagan translated Pope's ‘Messiah’ and ‘Temple of Fame’ into Latin verse, and this was published immediately (1749), with a dedication to the Duke of Newcastle, praying for pardon. Gahagan also addressed Prince George to the same effect in English verse, while Connor wrote a poetic appeal in English to the Duchess of Queensberry. These effusions are printed in the ‘Newgate Calendar.’ But all efforts failed, and the young men were hanged at Tyburn on Monday, 20 Feb. 1748–9. Some verses lamenting Gahagan's fate are quoted in the ‘Newgate Calendar.’ In the preface to the collected edition of Christopher Smart's poems, ‘unfortunate Gahagan’ is described as Smart's immediate predecessor in the successful writing of Latin verse.
