= Free and Candid Disquisitions =

1749 religious pamphlet by John Jones

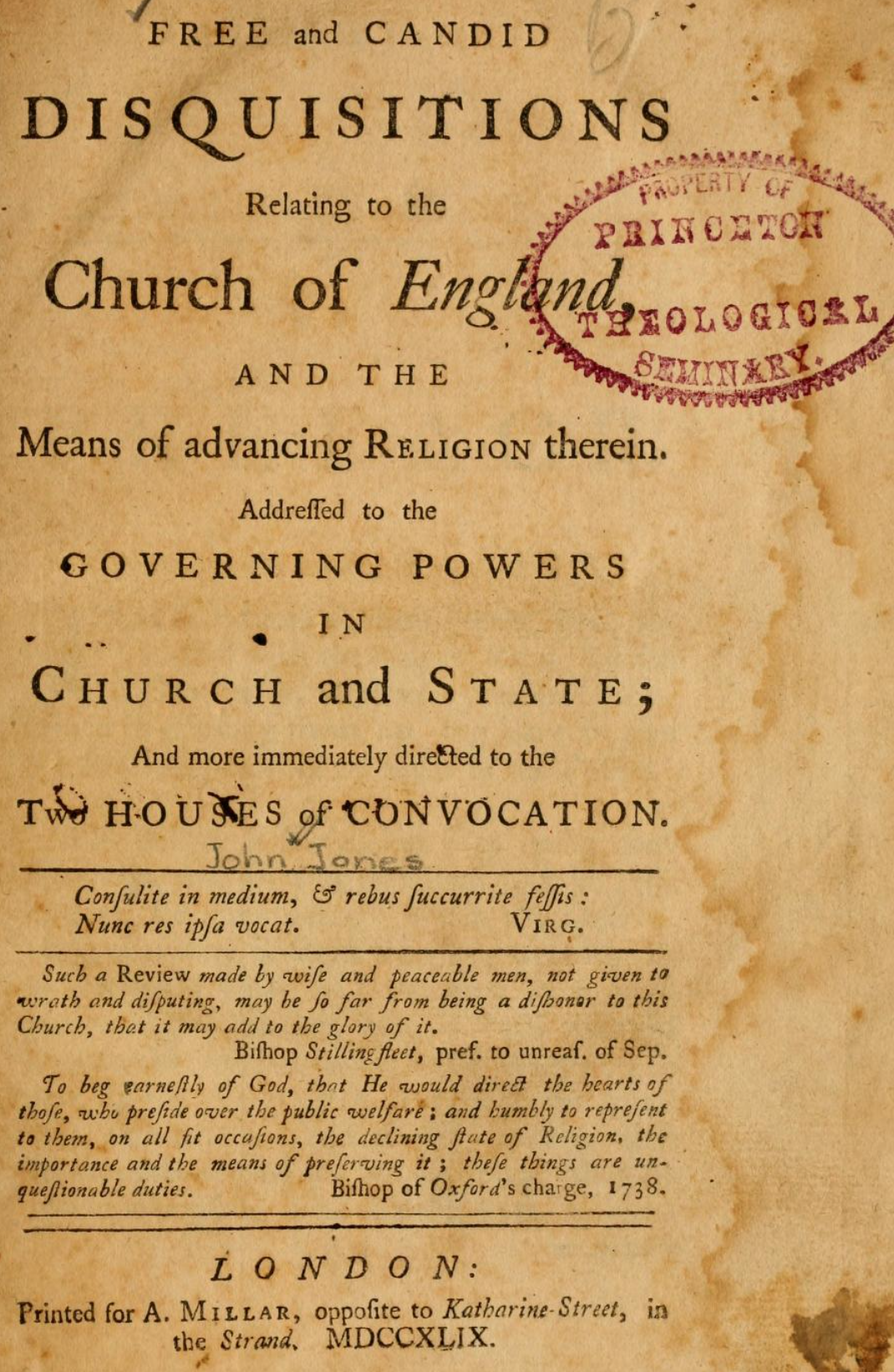
- Title page
- Author: John Jones (published anonymously)
- Language: English
- Subject: Christian liturgy, English Dissenters
- Published: 1749
- Publisher: A. Millar
- Publication place: Kingdom of Great Britain
- Pages: 367

Free and Candid Disquisitions (Note: The work's full title is Free and Candid Disquisitions Relating to the Church of England, and the Means of Advancing Religion therein; addressed to the governing powers in Church and State, and more immediately directed to the two Houses of Convocation.) is a 1749 pamphlet written and compiled by John Jones, a Welsh Church of England clergyman, and published anonymously. The work promoted a set of specific reforms to both the Church of England and its mandated book for liturgical worship, the 1662 Book of Common Prayer. Through these proposed changes, Jones hoped that the more Protestant independent Dissenters – who had largely broken with the Church of England in 1662 and been legally tolerated since 1689 – could be reintegrated into the church.

Free and Candid Disquisitions followed a failed attempt at a revised Book of Common Prayer in 1689 and other unsuccessful efforts towards reintegrating the independent Protestant Dissenters. Jones's proposals included combining and abbreviating the Sunday liturgies, removing latent Catholic influences from several rites, and providing improved hymns and psalms. He also challenged the requirement that clergy subscribe to the doctrinal statements of the Thirty-nine Articles. The text included an appendix of statements from historical figures and Jones's contemporaries supporting his positions.

The pamphlet's contents were the subject of significant discussion, with several responding texts both lauding and criticizing Jones's work. Despite a positive reception by Thomas Herring, the Archbishop of Canterbury, Jones's proposals were generally not accepted by the Church of England. However, his suggested alterations to the prayer book and advocacy of privately published liturgies were influential upon several Dissenter liturgical texts – including Theophilus Lindsey's liturgy and successive Unitarian prayer books – and the first editions of the American Episcopal Church's prayer book. Until the beginning of the Tractarian movement in the 19th century, Free and Candid Disquisitions remained a major influence on proposed liturgical changes in the Church of England.

== Background ==
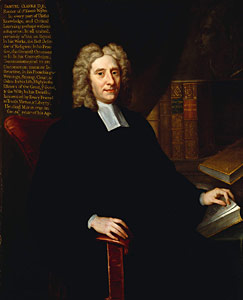
Samuel Clarke (pictured) publicly proposed revising the Book of Common Prayer in 1712 and created his own revision in 1724; John Jones was described by historian Ronald Jasper as Clarke's "foremost disciple".

Following the collapse of the Protectorate – a republican government which had been established after the 1642–1651 English Civil War and favoured the more Protestant practices of Puritanism – and the re-establishment of the monarchy with the 1660 Stuart Restoration, Charles II came to power as the King of England. He elevated the Episcopalian party – members of the Church of England who favoured bishops and whose worship was more similar to Catholic practices – that had been marginalized during the preceding Interregnum. Charles had promised religious toleration to both Royalist Presbyterians – who did not approve of bishops and worshipped according to Reformed forms within the Church of England – and Episcopalians with the Declaration of Breda in 1660. He had disadvantaged the Presbyterian party by convening of the Savoy Conference in 1661 to consider the future of the Church of England's liturgical worship. Episcopalians supported restoring the previously forbidden Book of Common Prayer, forcing the Presbyterians to make a case against such a proposal. (Note: In 1645, worship according to the Book of Common Prayer – then in its 1604 edition – was outlawed by the Puritan government. It was replaced by the Directory for the Publique Worship of God.) The Savoy Conference ended without compromise: Parliament rejected proposals from both Presbyterians and the surviving Durham House Group of Caroline Divines over sentiments that they were each responsible for the violence of the preceding 20 years.

Instead, the Church of England's Convocation produced the 1662 Book of Common Prayer. The new prayer book's use was legally required with the Act of Uniformity 1662, and episcopal holy orders were mandated for all clergy. Some 2,000 Nonconformist clergymen who refused to submit were ejected from their benefices on St Bartholomew's Day, 24 August 1662. Anglican liturgical historian Ronald Jasper put forward that the 1662 prayer book "marked a firm rejection of the Presbyterian schemes for comprehension", with comprehension referring to the reintegration of the independent Protestant Dissenters into the Church of England. (Note: Comprehension refers to affording latitude within the Church of England that allows Dissenters to remain practising members within it.)

In 1688, ire over King James II's personal and political favour of Catholicism spurred English Protestants towards forming a united opposition against the king, reviving Church of England interest in comprehension. William Sancroft, the Archbishop of Canterbury, had advised bishops in July 1688 to enjoin their flock to be wary of Popery and to show affinity towards Dissenters. With the help of some other Anglican divines, Sancroft began crafting a plan that would revise the Church of England's liturgy towards comprehension.

The 1688 Glorious Revolution expelled James II and installed William III – a Dutch Calvinist – and Mary II as joint monarchs. While Sancroft was deprived of his benefice as part of the Nonjuring schism, William III supported comprehension and the new king established a commission in September 1689 to draft a comprehending liturgy. The resulting 1689 Liturgy of Comprehension was rejected by Convocation due to disinterest, preferring to discuss the fate of the nonjurors. As Dissenters enjoyed better legal standing, interest in comprehension waned. After the Toleration Act was passed in May 1689, Dissenters were free to worship outside of the Church of England and its prescribed prayer book. The manuscript for the Liturgy of Comprehension was kept from public view by Archbishop of Canterbury Thomas Tenison, who feared that the text would result in angst from those who felt its concessions were too great and could be used to "justify their nonconformity" by those who found its "concessions were too little".

In 1712, Samuel Clarke, the Church of England rector of St James's Church, Piccadilly, published The Scriptural Doctrine of the Trinity. In the book, he challenged Trinitarian orthodoxy and suggesting alterations to the prayer book, such as excising the Athanasian Creed. Clark privately revised a copy of the prayer book in 1724 with his own manuscript changes to reflect these desires, removing or changing references to the Trinity and replacing the Nicene Creed with a psalm. John Jones, a semi-Arian Welsh Church of England priest who was the Vicar of Alconbury from 1741 until 1750, was referred to by Jasper as Clark's "foremost disciple". The essays that would comprise Free and Candid Disquisitions were presented to "a very eminent and worthy Prelate" in 1746, with the intention of their presentation to Convocation. Jones launched a campaign in 1748 to make the Liturgy of Comprehension publicly available. This effort failed, and it was not until the House of Commons ordered its publication in 1854 that the manuscript's contents were made public. Those interested in using the Liturgy of Comprehension for their own proposed revisions to the prayer book in the 18th century would rely upon distorted records of the 1689 commission's findings published by William Nicholls and Edmund Calamy. However, public discussion regarding revising the prayer book persisted.

== Contents ==
"May not the length of our public service (especially on Sunday-mornings) be in some reasonable measure contracted? And will it not, on many accounts, be expedient to contract it? especially considering the indevotion and coolness of the present age; which we have reason to think the length of our service does not contribute to lessen."

— Free and Candid Disquisitions, p. 22

Free and Candid Disquisitions was published anonymously as a 367-page pamphlet in an octavo printing by A. Millar of London in the first week of June, 1749. At least two further editions were published that year. The volume consists both of passages that Jones compiled from divines – many of whom were his contemporaries – and essays containing Jones's own suggestions. It is presented as a series of "queries and observations" on a number of issues, primarily liturgical, and is addressed to the Church of England, the state, and – most directly – Convocation. An appendix was included containing documentary evidence and quotations dating from between 1604 and 1748, starting with Francis Bacon and including Calamy's coverage of the 1689 Liturgy of Comprehension effort.

The text comprises 13 sections, an extended introduction, a postscript, and an appendix. Section I was concerned with a new Bible translation. The next sections described revising the prayer book: sections II–IV proposed alterations to the Sunday liturgies, section V addressed issues with the scriptural readings and psalters, section VI suggested the removal of the Athanasian Creed and revision of the catechism, section VII critiqued several rites, and section VIII proposed some additional rites for specific circumstances, including a rite for use during the visitation of prisoners. Section IX expressed a desire for printings of the Bible and prayer book to be correct and criticized limitations on when marriages were allowed to be held. Section X challenged requirements that clergy subscribe to the doctrinal statements of the Thirty-nine Articles.

Among the changes to the prayer book and its liturgies that Jones sought in order to effect comprehension were the removal of the Athanasian Creed (due to its complexity rather than any theological error), the deletion of excessive repetition of the Lord's Prayer and Gloria Patri, and the excision of anything not permitted by the Bible. The lectionary and liturgical calendar were scrutinized, with Jones suggesting that proper psalms be assigned to each Sunday. Jones's Puritan-like views were made evident in urging for the sign of the cross in the baptismal rite be made optional and private baptism abolished. The matters of the sign of the cross and ending the practice of sponsors at baptism were raised due to Jones's identification of these actions as vestiges of Catholicism that should be expunged. A similar grievance was raised about prohibitions on marriages occurring during particular seasons of the year. The only explicit doctrinal change suggested in Free and Candid Disquisitions was the alteration or outright cessation of infant baptism.

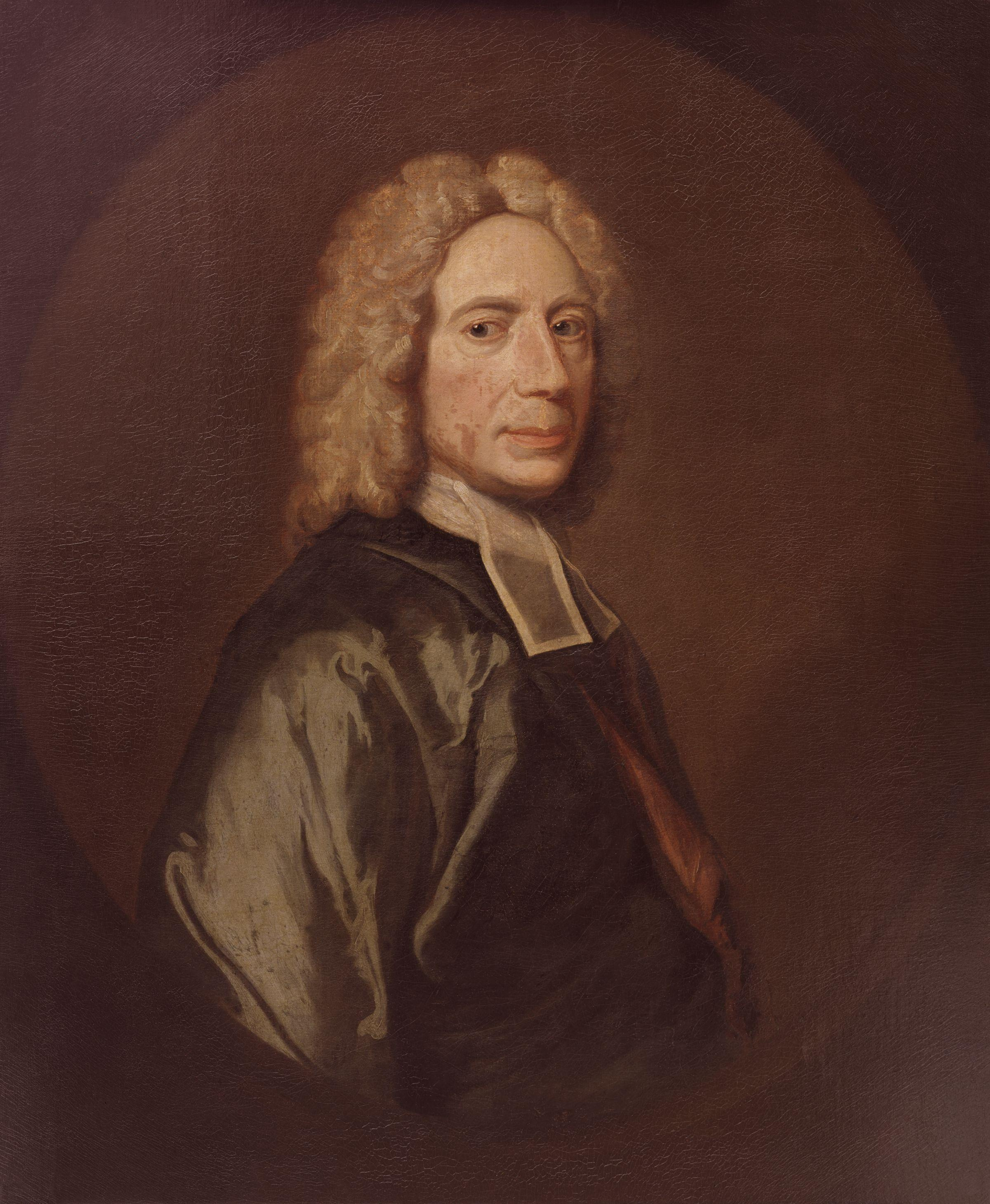
Free and Candid Disquisitions praised the hymns and psalms of Isaac Watts (pictured).

Jones contended that there was a pressing need for additional topical prayers and other new content in the prayer book, expressing a desire for prayers for families and use in prisons. He declared that introducing the proposed changes to collects from 1689 would bring them to "the utmost perfection". Jones also pressed for combining and abbreviating the Sunday morning liturgies. Finding that the Sunday recitation of Morning Prayer, the Litany, and the Ante-Communion rites was repetitive, Jones suggested they should be combined into a single, shorter rite. The 1637 Scottish Book of Common Prayer was suggested as a possible guide for revising the Communion rite. Should the Church of England fail to adopt these comprehending liturgical reforms, Jones argued, Dissenters should begin privately creating their own revisions.

Concern was also raised regarding the state of many parishes being such that no hymns were recited, with Jones writing, "neither psalm nor hymn can be had even on Sundays, much less on holy‐days and other days of prayer. So thin are the congregations, and so unskilled in singing." Jones praised Dissenter Isaac Watts's psalms and hymns – commenting on "the Christian instruction, and goodly solace and comfort" they provided – and called for further hymns to be written. Jones desired a better metrical psalter and targeted the Sternhold and Hopkins psalter commonly printed with the prayer book for removal.

Free and Candid Disquisitions also argued for other substantial reform in the Church of England, including reducing the number of tenets to which clergy would be required to subscribe. The pamphlet followed Clarke's example in its proposals challenging Trinitarian orthodoxy. Jones's work also challenged the requirement of subscribing to the Thirty-nine Articles for those who may not fully understand what teachings the articles affirm. He also questioned the relevancy of The Books of Homilies. He appraised the Reformation as an unfinished work and sought its completion, suggesting alterations to the Canons of 1604.

== Reception and influence ==
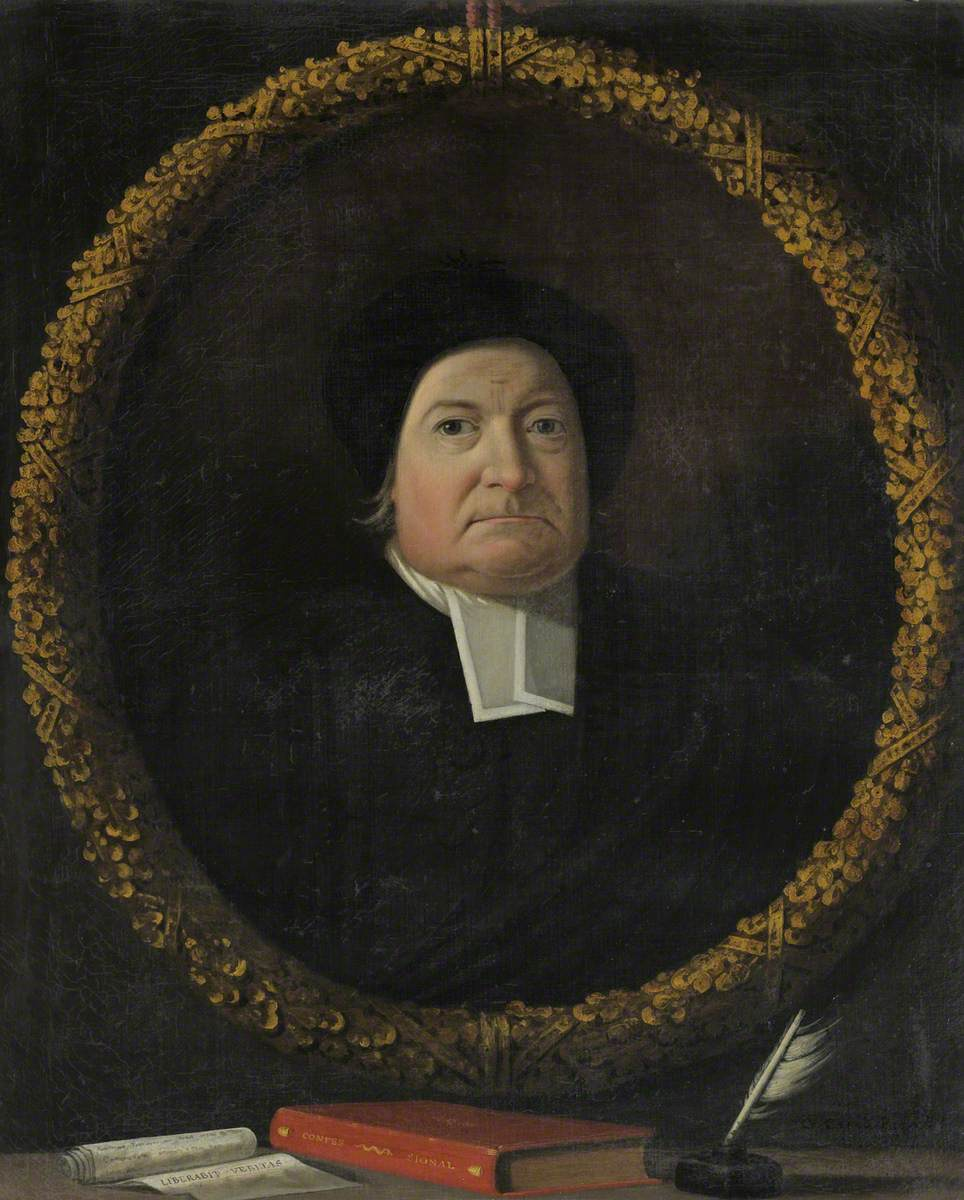
Francis Blackburne (pictured) published writings defending Jones's work in 1750 and 1766. Blackburne's son-in-law Theophilus Lindsey credited Free and Candid Disquisitions in his influential 1774 Unitarian prayer book.

Upon publication, Free and Candid Disquisitions and its proposals reinvigorated public debate regarding reform in the Church of England and has been credited as reopening the discussion in favour of comprehension. The September and October 1749 issues of The Gentleman's Magazine carried summaries of the pamphlet, and replies came quickly. These included clergyman John Boswell's large, two-part Remarks Upon a Treatise, (Note: Boswell's response was titled Remarks Upon a Treatise, Intituled Free and Candid Disquisitions Relating to the Church of England. It was published as an octavo.) which was published in 1750 and 1751 and argued against the need for the proposed reforms. This piece defended the 1662 prayer book as containing the best of early Christian liturgies and supported continuing both clerical subscription to the Thirty-nine Articles and the restrictions of the Test Acts. Boswell further argued against Free and Candid Disquisitions's Puritanism, as he deemed such sentiments as responsible for "the dreadful Scene of Misery, which we suffer'd in the last Century". Another critique was published in 1751 by John White, who was a vicar in Nayland and a fellow of St John's College, Cambridge. (Note: White's response, published anonymously, was entitled Free and Impartial Considerations Upon the Free and Candid Disquisitions Relating to the Church of England, Addressed to the Author of the Disquisitions.)

Clergyman Francis Blackburne published his own pamphlet, An Apology for the Author of the Free and Candid Disquisitions, in 1750 in defence of Free and Candid Disquisitions. This led some to believe that Blackburne had been the author of the original 1749 text. Blackburne had not contributed to Free and Candid Disquisitions, but he had read it in manuscript and returned it without corrections. After reading the manuscript, Blackburne lambasted Jones for the latter's trepidation over possibly offending those in power. The second volume of Boswell's critique of Free and Candid Disquisitions was also replying to Blackburne's 1750 pamphlet and the two-volume An Appeal to Common Reason and Candor, the latter published anonymously in 1750–1751.

In 1753, A New Form of Common-Prayer was published anonymously and gave credit to Free and Candid Disquisitions on its first page. A New Form of Common-Prayer offered liturgical revisions that answered Jones's queries, submitting these proposals and the duty of finally perfecting the Reformation to the Archbishop of Canterbury. However, it is generally considered that Thomas Herring – himself the Archbishop of Canterbury – wrote A New Form of Common-Prayer. (Note: The preface of A New Form of Common-Prayer says that its author postponed the release of his liturgy so that it might follow the publication of Free and Candid Disquisitions while also adding that he was "not otherwise concerned in it, than as every man ought to be, who has any regard for religion".) According to Jasper, Herring's motivation to accept the position of archbishop may have been theological beliefs he shared with Jones. Herring came to express uncertainty regarding pursuing reform for fear of encountering clerical and lay resistance that showed "determination and even peremptoriness". Ultimately, Convocation did not address Jones's proposals. (Note: Convocation had not performed anything other than "formal business" since it had been suspended in 1717 during the Bangorian Controversy.) Only one proposed alteration to the prayer book was actually accepted: in 1759, a topical prayer "for the ceasing of the distemper which lately raged among the horned cattle in this kingdom" – something Jones had specifically requested – was added.

Jones published Catholic Faith in Practice in 1765 and established a Protestant-aligned society to effect "a new Reformation in England". He died in 1770. Jones has been publicly identified as the sole author of Free and Candid Disquisitions since at least 1800. Free and Candid Disquisitions, along with Blackburne's 1766 The Confessional, (Note: The full title of Blackburne's 1766 work was The Confessional, or a Full and Free Inquiry into the Right, Utility, and Success of Establishing Confessions of Faith and Doctrine in Protestant Churches. In The Confessional, Blackburne commented that "no book of equal importance ever sunk so suddenly into oblivion as the Free and Candid Disquisitions; nor was any other ever treated with more contempt and scorn by those who ought to have paid the greatest regard to the subject of it".) proved influential upon the 1771–1774 Feathers Tavern Petition against the requirement of clerical subscription to the Thirty-nine Articles.

Free and Candid Disquisitions's appeal for unofficial revisions succeeded. Between 1751 and 1768, six people created their own formulas for revising the prayer book – including A New Form of Common-Prayer – with each demonstrating varying degrees of influence from the 1689 proposal and Jones's work. (Note: During the 1751–1768 period, ten liturgical texts total were privately published in England, with six being developments of the 1662 prayer book. Only one of these six, Beauty of Holiness (1752), was not explicitly ordered towards comprehending Dissenters.) Of these six liturgies, only one expressed orthodox Anglican theology and five made reference to Free and Candid Disquisitions. Theophilus Lindsey, a Feathers Tavern petitioner who was a son-in-law of Francis Blackburne, acquired a copy of Clarke's manuscript changes to the prayer book from John Disney, another son-in-law of Blackburne. From this, Lindsey published a revised prayer book (Note: The title of Lindsey's prayer book in its 1774 edition was The Book of Common Prayer Reformed according to the Plan of the late Dr Samuel Clarke.) which he used at his Essex Street Chapel. Crediting both Clarke and Free and Candid Disquisitions, Lindsey's liturgy proved the dominant influence on Unitarian prayer books. (Note: Lindsey attributed his departure from ministry in the Church of England to a letter by William Robertson; Robertson's own resignation from the established church was over liturgical concerns he had developed after reading Free and Candid Disquisitions.) John Wesley's 1784 The Sunday Service of the Methodists in North America shared similarities to Lindsey's liturgy, Jones's suggestions, and the Savoy Conference's Puritan proposals. (Note: Wesley's service book also shows use of Calamy's history. Unlike Unitarian revisions and the 1786 American proposed prayer book, Wesley's liturgies reflected Trinitarian orthodoxy. In his journal, Wesley correctly surmised that there was only a single author of Free and Candid Disquisitions despite the pamphlet's implications to the contrary.)

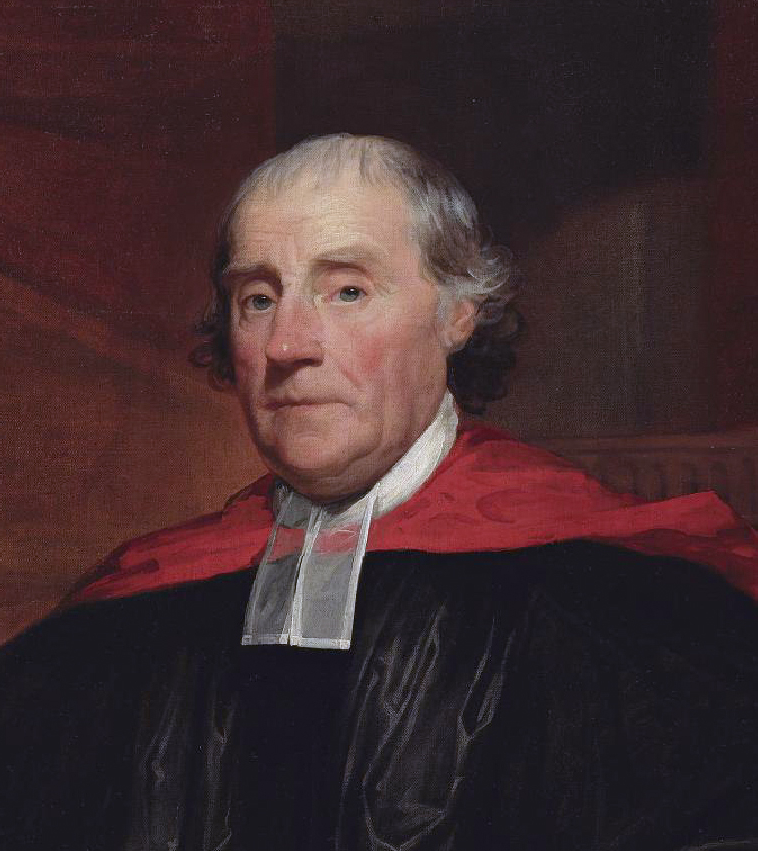
In his work on the short-lived 1786 American prayer book, William Smith (pictured) is thought to have embraced the proposals of Free and Candid Disquisitions.

Following the 1775–1783 American Revolution, the Episcopal Church of the United States set about revising its own edition of the prayer book. The proposed revision submitted in 1786 featured a preface of queries later described by liturgist Marion J. Hatchett as an outline of Free and Candid Disquisitions. William Smith's work in creating the 1786 proposed prayer book led some of his fellow clergymen to believe he had made the revision while consulting a copy of Free and Candid Disquisitions. The new church desired substantial change beyond simple alterations, the 1786 text was seldom used before the Episcopal Church adopted another revision submitted in 1789. Hatchett held that Jones's work was also among the influences of the 1789 American Book of Common Prayer. According to Hatchett, influences from Free and Candid Disquisitions and other early 18th-century texts that advocated for reforms acceptable to a broader set of Protestants (a belief known as latitudinarianism) were more significant in the production of the 1789 prayer book than described by other scholarship. (Note: Hatchett identified Free and Candid Disquisitions and The Expediency and Necessity of Revising and Improving the Publick Liturgy (also published anonymously in 1749) as the most significant early latitudinarian proposals for liturgical reform of the early 18th century.) A shortened version of the 1786 preface retaining the influence from Free and Candid Disquisitions has been used in the succeeding prayer books of the Episcopal Church through to its present, 1979-dated edition.

Richard Watson, the Bishop of Llandaff, published an anonymous pamphlet (Note: The title of Watson's pamphlet was Considerations on the Expediency of Revising the Liturgy and Articles of the Church of England, by a Consistent Protestant.) in 1790 containing liturgical proposals also based on Clarke and Free and Candid Disquisitions. William Winstanley Hull published a work (Note: The title of Hull's work was Inquiry Concerning the Means and Expedience of proposing and making any Change in the Canons, Articles or Liturgy, or in any of the Laws affecting the interests of the Church of England.) in 1828 that looked favourably upon the 1789 American prayer book and put forward that a royal commission or House of Commons select committee be established to reform the prayer book. Among the changes Hull submitted was a synthesis of the three Sunday morning liturgies based on Jones's proposals. Hull's proposed liturgical revisions were similar to others in the early 19th century, demonstrating a Low-Church bias and relying upon the prior works of the 1689 effort, Clarke, and Jones. Such proposals remained the norm until Tractarians later in the 19th century renewed interest in pre-Reformation ritual and prompted revisions which were intended to restore these practices.
