= Andrew Millar (publisher) =

British publisher (1705–1768)

- Born: 1705; Kingdom of Scotland
- Died: 8 June 1768 (aged 63); Kew Green, London
- Occupation: Publisher

Andrew Millar (1705 – 8 June 1768) was a British publisher in the eighteenth century.

== Biography ==
In 1725, as a twenty-year-old bookseller apprentice, he evaded Edinburgh city printing restrictions by going to Leith to print, which was considered beyond Edinburgh's jurisdiction. Millar was soon to take over his apprentice master's London print shop. He was actively involved in railing against the authorities in Edinburgh.

About 1729, Millar started business as a bookseller and publisher in the Strand, London. His own judgment in literary matters was small, but he collected an excellent staff of literary advisers, and did not hesitate to pay what at the time were considered large prices for good material. "I respect Millar, sir," said Dr Johnson in 1755, "he has raised the price of literature." He paid Thomson £105 for The Seasons, and Fielding a total sum of £700 for Tom Jones and £1000 for Amelia.

Millar was one of the syndicate of booksellers who financed Johnson's Dictionary in 1755, and on him the work of seeing that book through the press mainly fell. During the same year Millar published the first edition of the Mitchell Map. He also published the histories of Robertson and Hume, as well as John Jones's Free and Candid Disquisitions.

Millar was the plaintiff in the 1769 case Millar v Taylor which held that authors and publishers are entitled to a perpetual common law copyright. That decision was ultimately overturned in the landmark 1774 case Donaldson v Beckett, whose unsuccessful plaintiff was Millar's apprentice, Thomas Becket (or Beckett).

Millar died at his villa at Kew Green, near London, on 8 June 1768.
