= John Jones (controversialist) =

Welsh clergyman and controversialist (1700–1770)

- Born: 1700; Llanilar, Wales, England
- Died: 8 August 1770 (aged 69–70)
- Education: University of Oxford (BA)
- Notable work: Free and Candid Disquisitions

John Jones (1700 – 8 August 1770) was a Welsh clergyman and controversialist. He was the compiler of Free and Candid Disquisitions, an anonymously published 1749 book on reforms to the Church of England and the 1662 Book of Common Prayer.

== Life ==
He was born in Llanilar, Cardiganshire, the son of John Jones. He was admitted to Worcester College, Oxford, migrated to St Edmund Hall, graduating with a B.A. in 1725. From college, he went to the curacy of King's Walden in Hertfordshire. In 1726 or thereabouts he became curate at Abbot's Ripton, Huntingdonshire, and began compiling for London booksellers.

Around 1741, he moved to the vicarage of Alconbury, near Huntingdon. There he had difficulty in collecting the small tithes, and gave up the vicarage in 1750. At this time his friends included Gilbert West and Philip Doddridge, John Barker and George Lyttelton. In the same year he obtained the rectory of Bolnhurst in Bedfordshire, but complained that it did not suit his health. For a short period after 1755 he was curate for John Berridge, at Everton, Bedfordshire. But they quarrelled.

In 1757, Jones accepted the curacy of Welwyn in Hertfordshire from Edward Young. He remained at Welwyn until 1765, when Young died, and he acted as one of his executors, receiving a legacy of £200.

As a result of appeals to friends for assistance, Jones was in April 1767 inducted into the vicarage of Shephall or Sheephall, Hertfordshire, where he continued until his death on 8 August 1770. He was unmarried.

== Works ==
In 1749, Jones published anonymously Free and Candid Disquisitions relating to the Church of England, and the means of advancing Religion therein. The book was a collection of short passages selected from the writings of eminent Anglican divines, all advocating revision of the liturgy. A controversy ensued; Jones preserved his anonymity. The book was attacked by John Boswell; it influenced William Robertson. It was long believed that the work was by Archdeacon Francis Blackburne, who was a friend of Jones, and had read some of it in manuscript; Blackburne wrote a pamphlet in its defence. Jones's role as editor became known in the Monthly Repository of 1807.

In 1750 Jones published An Appeal to Common Reason and Candour, in behalf of a Review submitted to the Serious Consideration of all Unprejudiced Members of the Church of England. Shortly before leaving Welwyn Jones published Catholic Faith and Practice: being Considerations of Present Use and Importance in point of Religion and Liberty (1755), and A Letter to a Friend in the Country.

After Jones's death, Benjamin Dawson edited and published his Free Thoughts on the subject of a Farther Reformation of the Church of England (1771), identified as by the author of A short and safe Expedient for terminating the present Debate about Subscriptions of 1769.

== Legacy ==
Early in 1783 much of Jones's correspondence with Thomas Birch and other papers of his were presented to John Nichols, who published extracts in the Gentleman's Magazine and in his Literary Anecdotes. Most of his manuscripts passed on his death into the hands of Dr. Thomas Dawson, a dissenting minister at Hackney; they went to Dr. Williams's Library, London.
