= William Priestley (Louisiana planter) =

American planter

- Born: May 7, 1771; Leeds, England
- Died: 1838 (aged 66–67)
- Occupation: Planter
- Known for: Being the third child and second son of Joseph Priestley; establishing a school in Pointe Coupee Parish, Louisiana; purchasing a sugar plantation on the Mississippi

William Priestley (7 May 1771 – 1838) was the third child and second son of Joseph Priestley and his wife Mary Wilkinson. He spent some time in France, before migrating to the US in 1793, taking the oath of citizenship on 8 October 1798. In 1801 he moved to Louisiana, with the intention of establishing a school in Point Coupee Parish. Some time between 1804 and 1807, William purchased a sugar plantation on the west bank of the Mississippi River.

== William Priestley's early life and character ==
William Priestley was born in Basinghall Street, Leeds, in the manse associated with Mill Hill Chapel, where his father was minister. He was educated in Bristol in John Prior Estlin's school, before spending two years at Daventry Academy, his father's alma mater, 1787–89. William Priestley was a mild-tempered and softly-spoken bohemian with long brown hair thrown back over his shoulders, and a passion for nature and music. He was a proficient flautist, who spoke French and German, studied Anglo-Saxon texts, and read Norse mythology. He carved wooden chess-pieces, and sculpted clay models of ancient temples. He was not inclined towards a career in commerce. His father, writing to a friend, regretted that William's "temper [frame of mind] and high spirit [zest for life], will hardly suit trade." In this, William and his father were very much alike, for, when he was nineteen, Joseph Priestley himself, had rejected a firm offer of a career in commerce; as a minister at Needham Market, his congregation had objected to Priestley's "gay and airy disposition;" and at Nantwich he had a habit of vaulting over the counter of the grocer's shop at which he lodged. Regrettably some modern historians have misunderstood contemporary word-usage, and have read the clause: "William's temper and high spirit, will hardly suit trade," in a twenty-first-century idiom, mistakenly accusing William of being "too high-spirited and hot-tempered;" and erroneously denouncing him as the "black sheep" of the family.

In the Summer of 1789 William accompanied his uncle William Wilkinson on a business trip through northern Europe and France, and was in Paris during the storming of the Bastille. When William Wilkinson return to England, William Priestley went on to Germany, as tutor to a family in Frankfurt. Despite William's disinclination towards office work, his father was prepared to pay for him to be articled to a merchant, though he baulked at the £1,000 Benjamin Vaughan had wanted. In December 1790, William Russell agreed to take William on as an articled accounts clerk for three years, with a view to him looking after the Russell brothers' interests in America or France. William Priestley was working for the Russells at the time of the Birmingham riots. He insisted on remaining at home, "Fairhill", as his parents fled, initially to ensure that the kitchen fire and candles were fully extinguished. William helped round up numerous young volunteers, with whom he laboured several hours to remove as many of Joseph Priestley's books and manuscripts as they could, continuing to carry books and furniture down the staircase even as the handrails, banisters and treads were being systematically demolished by the leading rioters. After the riots, William remained in Birmingham, gathering up such of his father's books and manuscripts as had survived. In the Autumn of 1791, William joined his father in London, where Joseph Priestley was settling into a new home in Lower Clapton, while William's mother was with his sister at Heath-forge, Wombourne; brother Joseph was working in Manchester; and brother Henry was at school in Bristol. Being Joseph Priestley's only relative in London (apart from his uncle Timothy, minister at Jewin Street chapel), William helped manage the workmen carrying out numerous repairs and works, and helped his father arrange his library and set up his laboratory. William assisted in managing the household, such as it was, and looked after the dietetic needs of his father, who suffered a bowel condition throughout his adult life, with episodes of severe diarrhoea. The noted Unitarian benefactress, Mrs Elizabeth Rayner, was impressed enough by William's practical care and filial concern for his father, to single him out for particular mention in her will.

== France (1792) ==
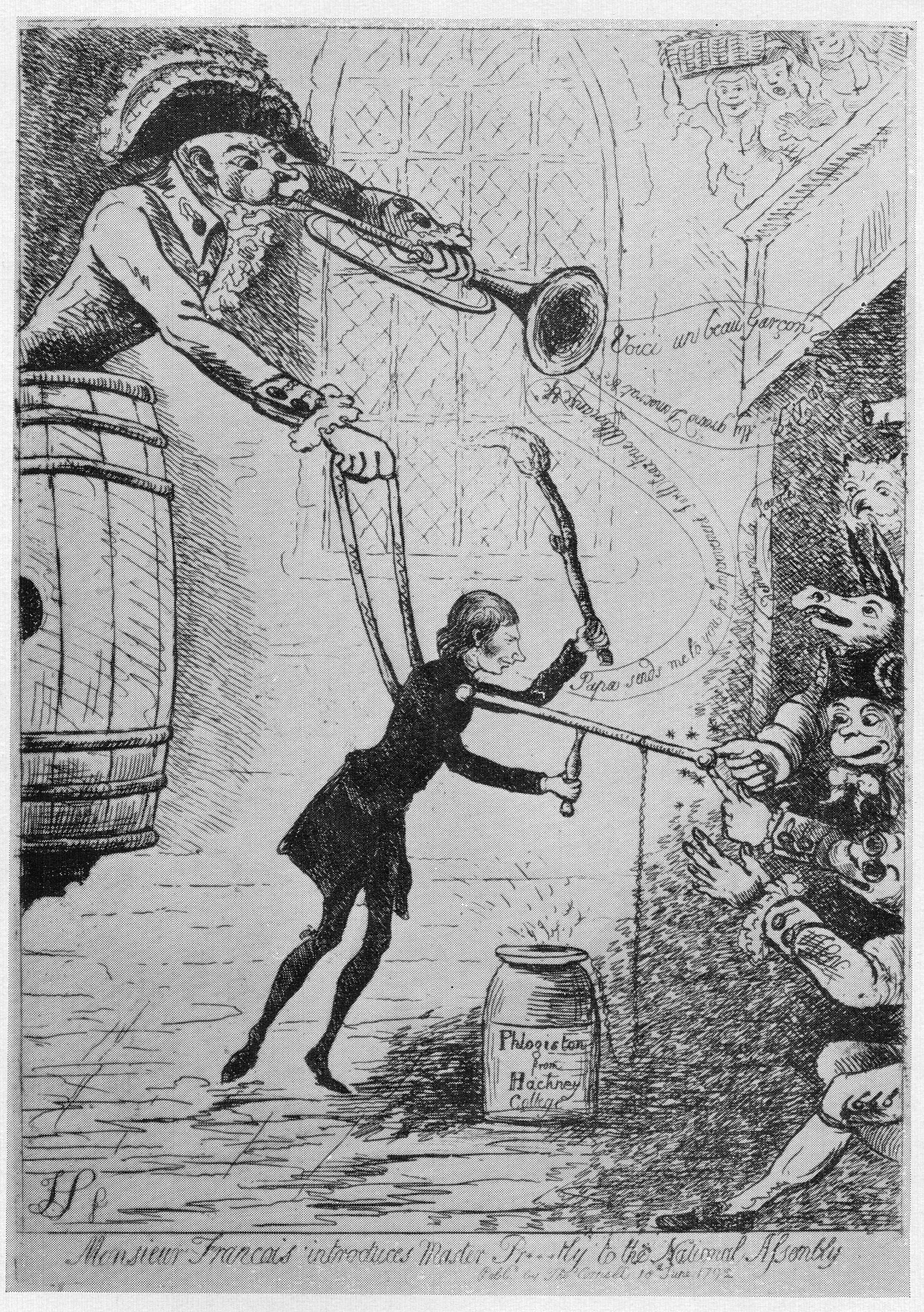
William Priestley before the Legislative Assembly.

After his brother Joseph's marriage to Elizabeth Rayner in April 1792, William Priestley travelled to Paris, at the behest of William Russell, who was rebuilding his mercantile business from Gloucester. At Paris on 8 June 1792, President Tardiveau introduced William to the Assemblée législative. William asked M Français to read out his brief address, because of his "voix extrêment faible":

William Priestley is eager to pay his just respects to the first magistrates of a people who are celebrated not only in England, but amongst all nations that value liberty, energy [l'énergie had been a rallying cry of the revolution], and virtue. "Go", said his father, "live amongst this brave and welcoming people; learn from them to detest tyranny, and to love liberty." William Priestley therefore comes to this land of France. He proposes to make his home here, and seeks to enjoy the rights of a citizen of France (a title which he prefers a hundred times to that of a king of an arbitrary state) – a member of a sovereign people that will greatly honour him by his adoption. In the exercise of his duties as citizen and soldier, he will always keep in mind, and in his heart, the public spirit of the nation, the energy of its magistrates, and the lessons of his father.

After a long speech by Tardiveau extolling the virtues of Joseph Priestley, interrupted fourteen times by applause, the Assemblée conferred letters of naturalization, and declared William an adopted son of France. The caricaturist James Sayers produced an etching of the event.

== New England and Pennsylvania (1792-1801) ==
Following the September Massacres, William migrated to America directly from France. He visited Boston, and spent some time in Brattleboro, Vermont, with the also newly arrived family of William Wells, who was looking to buy a farm there. In the Autumn of 1794, after visiting his parents in New York, William stayed for a while in Boston, spending time with the Unitarian minister Dr James Freeman, and visiting Freeman's Harvard classmate Dr William Bentley, Unitarian pastor of East Church, Salem; though, for several weeks at a time, in October and December, William was ill with a high fever, perhaps malaria. After recovering his health, William removed to the backwoods of Northumberland County, Pennsylvania, at Point township (now Northumberland borough) in February 1795. Here, William and his brother Henry bought a 284-acre plot of woodland, which they attempted to transform into a farm, later called "Fairhill", felling and uprooting trees, and obtaining lime to sweeten the soil by building their own lime kilns. Henry Priestley died 11 December 1795, possibly of malaria which he may have contracted after landing at New York.

On 3 February 1796, William Priestley married Margaret Foulke, "an amiable and sensible young woman" of Middle Paxton, at Paxtang Presbyterian Church, Harrisburg. A few days later, Joseph Priestley travelled alone to Philadelphia, William's mother being too unwell to travel. Mary Priestley's continuing ill-health would force the doctor to cancel planned excursions to New York and Boston, and return home early, at the end of May. Joseph Priestley Jr.'s wife, Elizabeth Ryland-Priestley, a middle-class Englishwoman could offer little in the way of care; so, throughout 1796, Margaret Foulke-Priestley, a frontierswoman not slow to roll up her sleeves, nursed Mary Priestley, moving in, and eventually bringing her own sister, so that between the two of them they could nurse Mary Priestley twenty-four hours a day. Margaret took over many the household duties, which, on Joseph Priestley's return included dealing with his dietary needs. She introduced the Priestleys to the benefits of Indian meal or Maize flour, suggesting advantages for Dr Priestley's health. Despite Margaret's nursing care, Mary Priestley died Saturday 17 September 1796.

Joseph Priestley moved into his elder son's, Joseph Jr.'s home, to which the virulent anti-Federalist Thomas Cooper was a frequent visitor, and in which Thomas Cooper's son, Thomas Jr., lodged. Thomas Cooper, Joseph Priestley Jr., and his wife Elizabeth Ryland-Priestley, now embroiled Joseph Priestley in political agitation, enlisting him in what William Cobbett called: "The Priestley gang". William Priestley's farm had failed, and he was spending an increasing amount of time in Philadelphia, exploring possibilities for a new career. William, who disliked controversy, was embarrassed by continually being stopped in the street and questioned about his father's conduct. The situation became even worse after December 1798, when his elder brother, Joseph Priestley Jr. left on a visit to England, not to return until August 1800. During her husband's absence, Elizabeth Ryland-Priestley became involved with Thomas Cooper, perhaps romantically, but certainly by collaborating with him during his temporary editorship of the Sunbury and Northumberland Gazette from 20 Apr to 29 June 1799, writing several political essays for him. In September, Thomas Cooper printed a seditious handbill, which Joseph Priestley helped distribute around Point township, and across the Susquehanna at Sunbury. Cobbett's Porcupine's Gazette printed extracts from this handbill under the headline "PRIESTLEY", with the prefatory assertion that: "Dr Priestley has taken great pains to circulate this address, has travelled through the country for the purpose, and is in fact the patron of it. Joseph Priestley's activities were causing embarrassment to his friends, not least, Benjamin Vaughan and John Vaughan. With Joseph Priestley now being styled the "journeyman of discontent and sedition", John Vaughan wrote to his brother that Joseph Priestley: had allowed himself to fall too much under the influence of a Thomas Cooper, a man whose "violence creates Violence in the neighbourhood, the Dr has got himself into the Vortex insensibly, & been (by those who want the sanction of his name) urged to Measures, he had hitherto avoided". A month later, Benjamin Vaughan wrote to Shelburne, saying that he would write to Priestley, "but with little hope of doing good to one so decided upon doing himself harm":

He constantly represented to me his tranquil life & his abstinence from politics, & has suddenly adopted the acts & sentiments of the most imprudent zealots in politics. He has no turn for discretion himself; indeed his system [is] against it; & he is surrounded by persons who are crafty knaves or hot-headed firebrands.

By now, William had decided on establishing a school where he would teach French and German, and also the flute. Initially, he planned to settle his family temporarily, perhaps at Johnstown on the river Conemaugh, while his financial affairs were sorted out, and then set up home somewhere along the Ohio or Mississippi rivers. On Tuesday 8 April 1800, William visited his father to discuss his plans, and express his concerns, in his brother's absence, about the relationship between Elizabeth Ryland-Priestley and Thomas Cooper. It appears that he also had a commission from Benjamin Vaughan and John Vaughan to try to disengage Joseph Priestley from the adverse influence of Thomas Cooper; and a further commission from his wife Margaret Foulke-Priestley, to question Elizabeth about the type of flour she used for Joseph Priestley's meals. The meeting was acrimonious, with Joseph Priestley coming down firmly on the side of Elizabeth, and denouncing William's suggestions and allegations. Although William and his father continued to correspond amicably enough, William never visited his father again.

== Incident of food poisoning ==
Six days after William left his father, on Monday 14 April 1800 in the afternoon after dinner and into the evening, various members of Joseph Priestley's household fell ill with vomiting, some with more severe symptoms than others, except for young Tom Cooper who escaped the illness. With Joseph Priestley keeping largely to a vegetable diet, the family may have had a roast chicken on the Sunday, and on the Monday, perhaps, a vegetable stew in a chicken stock with a pastry crust, followed by a milk pudding, typically made from fresh breadcrumbs, eggs, milk and cream. The cause of the illness is likely to have been puking sickness (The Priestleys kept a milking cow, on pasture bordered by woodland.) or bacterial infection.

Elizabeth Ryland-Priestley, still seething from William's remarks, contrived to believe that William had poisoned them by adding arsenic to the flour. This was impossible, of course, because William hadn't been near the house for a week, and the flour had been used every day; and all the family had fallen ill on the same evening. Elizabeth persuaded a local physician, Dr William Cozens (1760-1836) to examine their oral discharges, and the flour boxes in the kitchen. He found no trace of poison, and could only surmise that if the family's food had become adulterated, it could not have been by anything worse than an emetic such as tartar emetic. Elizabeth Ryland-Priestley's ridiculous and spiteful outburst was reported in the Reading Advertiser on Saturday 26 April 1800, preceded by gory accounts of cases of parricide in France by children anxious to demonstrate their revolutionary zeal. The story was a flash in the pan and soon forgotten, however, although Dr Cozens did not find any tartar emetic, nor had he the means to test for it, some modern historians, misreading contemporary accounts, have either repeated Elizabeth's allegation, or, as perversely, proposed that William "put tartar emetic in the family's flour". Recent research rejects any adulteration of the Priestleys' food, and has completely vindicated William Priestley.

== Louisiana (1801–1838) ==
Leaving his pregnant wife and young son with his parents-in-law at Middle Paxton, William Priestley spent ten months trailing the banks of the Ohio and Mississippi, in search of a suitable place at which to settle. For a while he decided on Louisville, where he had received an invitation to establish a school; but even here he was interrogated about his father's politics. Early in 1801, John Vaughan wrote suggesting that William buy a cotton plantation on the Mississippi River, and giving him an introduction to William Dunbar, who owned a large cotton plantation at Natchez. William, who had been in Paris at the inauguration of l'âge de liberté, d'egalité, et de fraternité, was horrified with Vaughan's suggestion. When he and Harry were clearing their land together, they had worked alongside their hired labourers, treating them as equals, how could he now oversee enslaved labourers? William wrote to his father, who in turn wrote to John Vaughan to underline the extent of William's inexorable determination against owning or managing enslaved workers.

Having gathered together class-sets of maths books, English grammars, French dictionaries, a pair of globes, a microscope, half-a-dozen German flutes and flute music, William and Margaret, with their children William Jr and Lucy, left Pennsylvania in autumn 1801, travelling downstream in a covered flatboat. They settled in Pointe Coupee Parish, where William planned his school, and where two more children were born. Sometime between 1804 and 1807, William bought a sugar plantation, some ninety miles downriver, at Vacherie, St James Parish.

We have been left no reason for William's change of heart, though, following the Louisiana Purchase, a sugar plantation was a sound investment. Many of the new neighbours who welcomed him to Pointe Coupee, plantation owners themselves, would have expected and encouraged him to buy a plantation.

Happier had William worked his farm with hired free-men, except that free labourers were not available in Louisiana at the time, at least not in any number. What honour would William have reaped had he purchased two dozen enslaved workers, and then freed them? But such an example would have raised a slave-insurrection extending from Baton Rouge to New Orleans. Then his neighbours would have effected what a Birmingham mob had failed to do – lynch a Priestley. His aversion to slavery may have been tempered by visiting plantations where enslaved workers were treated humanely and with dignity, if that is not a contradiction in terms. He may have felt that, aside from their enslavement, if their enslavement can be put aside, the day to day experience of unfettered, properly fed and decently housed enslaved workers, under a benign master, would not compare unfavourably with that of tied farm-labourers in England; or factory hands housed in crowded and filthy tenements, who worked long hours for insubstantial pay that didn't cover rent and rations, who were subject to a harsh and partial justice system, who faced the hazards of dangerous and poisonous environments, and suffered recurring starvation when wheat prices rose.

At the end of 1825, William's respectability was sealed when the citizens of St James Parish elected his son, William Priestley Jr., to the Louisiana House of Representatives, where he gave his time to constituency issues.

In 1835, William's niece, Eliza Finch (1795-1835) arrived at the Priestley plantation, seeking assistance, with her husband, a Unitarian preacher, Rev William Steill Brown (1800-1836), and four children. Eliza, William Steill Brown, and two of their children died soon afterwards. William and Margaret Priestley cared for the two surviving children, Gertrude 'Wyoming' Brown (1826–1896) and Isabel Brown (1829-aft.1865), until after William Priestley's death at the end of 1838, when the girls were informally adopted by Colonel Isaac Trimble Preston (1793-1852), who was also a member of the Louisiana House of Representatives.

Margaret Foulke-Priestley died aged 86 in New Orleans, 1 November 1857.

== William Priestley's children ==
William Priestley (c. 1798–1841), at the beginning of 1839, bought property in New Orleans, and invested as a sleeping partner in what became the very successful firm of Priestley & Bein, which traded in metal stock, cutlery, ships chandlery, and general hardware; and won several government contracts. He never married, and died of cholera, 21 September 1841.

Lucy Priestley (1800–1882), married Alexander Orme (1795–1840), 21 December 1818, and bore him eleven children.

Catherine Caroline Priestley (c. 1802–65), married-1 Henry Dickenson Richardson, the couple having five children, the eldest becoming the architect Henry Hobson Richardson; married-2 a Scot, John D Bein (1803–63), of Priestley and Bein hardware merchants.

Jane Priestley (c. 1805–1885) married-1 John Woodman Musgrove (1809–31), son of Liverpool merchant Robert Musgrove, 24 Aug 1830; married-2 John Bell Camden (1803–57), 27 Mar 1851. She died 12 September 1885
