= André-Daniel Laffon de Ladebat =

French financier, politician and philanthropist (1746–1829)

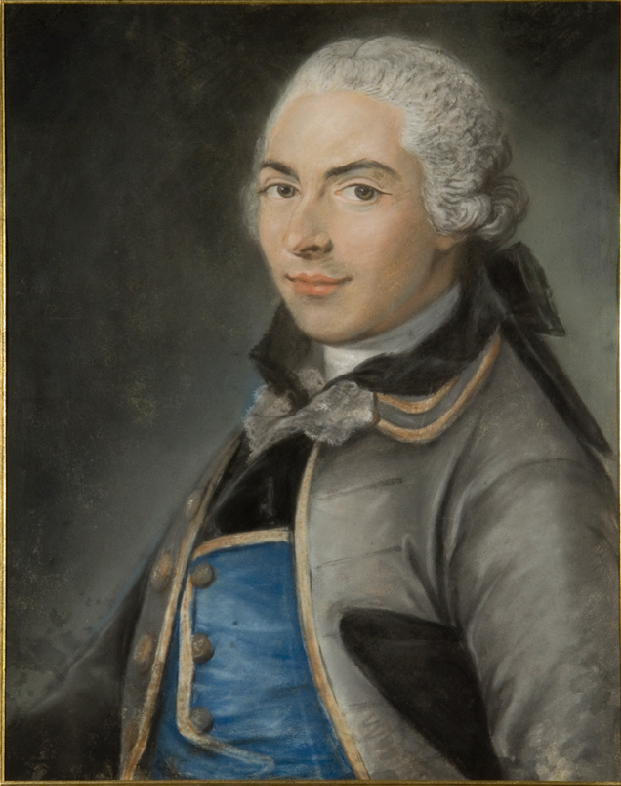
- André-Daniel Laffon de Ladebat
- Born: 30 November 1746; Bordeaux, France
- Died: 14 October 1829 (aged 82); Paris, France
- Occupations: Financier, politician
- Known for: President of the Council of Ancients; Deputy of Gironde in the Council of the Ancients; President of the Legislative Assembly; Deputy of Gironde in the Legislative Assembly

André-Daniel Laffon de Ladebat (30 November 1746 – 14 October 1829) was a French financier, politician, and philanthropist.

== Early life ==
André Laffon de Ladebat was born in Bordeaux, France, the son of commercial shipowner Jacques-Alexandre Laffon de Ladebat. He studied in the Netherlands at the Protestant University of Franeker.

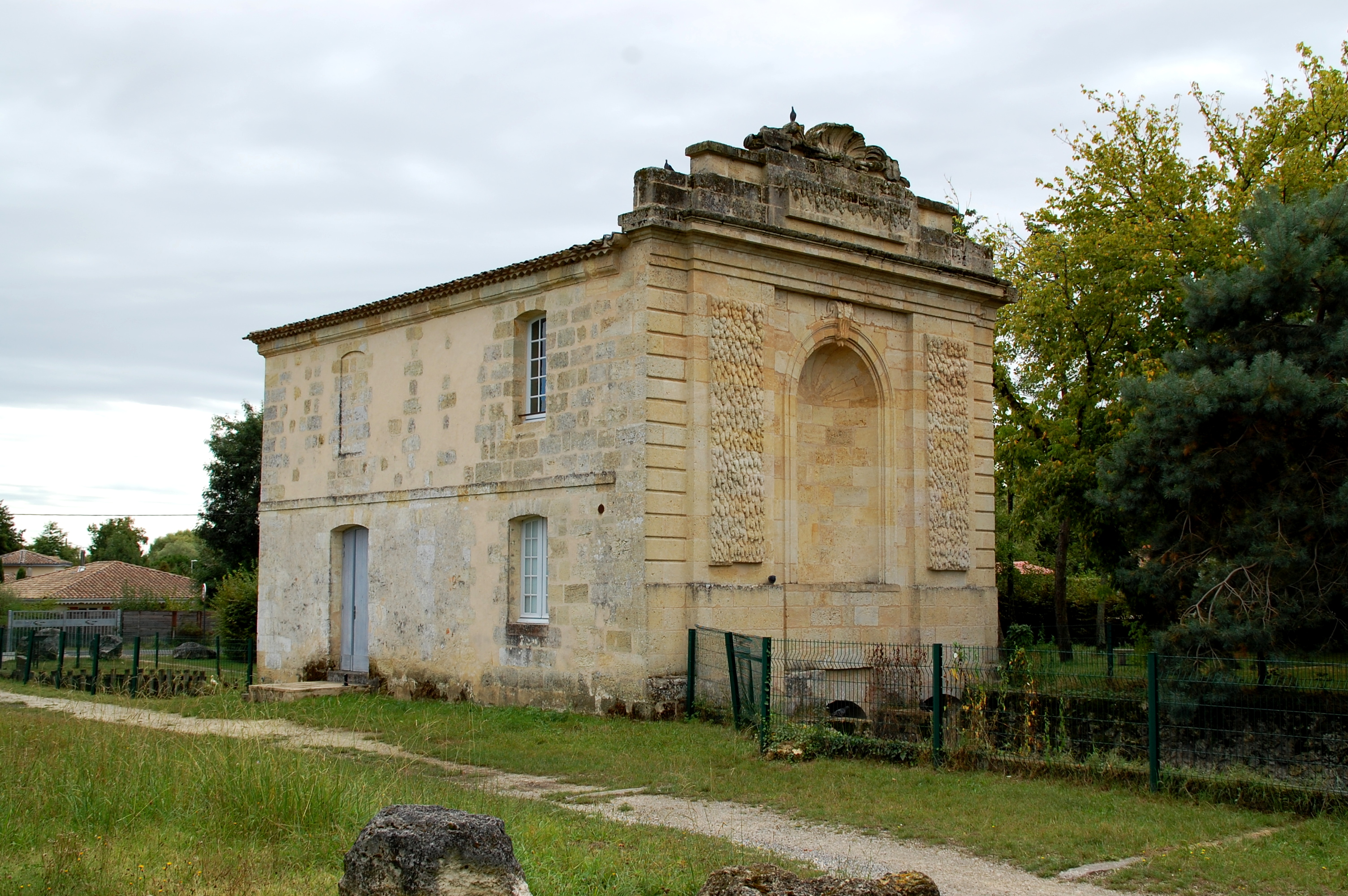
Noès watermill, vestige of the Experimental Farm

In 1763, returning to France after a stay in England, de Ladebat entered his father's naval armaments business, invested heavily in the development of an "Experimental Farm" in Pessac, and began to deforest the moors of Bordeaux. During the same period, he actively participated in the work of the Bordeaux Academy of Sciences as well as the Academy of Painting and Sculpture, of which he was president.

De Ladebat distinguished himself through his writings on finance, political economy, and the improvement of living conditions. He is especially noted for his 1788 work "Discourse on the Necessity and the Means of Abolishing Slavery in the Colonies," which was published in Bordeaux and read several years later in a session of the Legislative Assembly and was drawn upon by the Societé des amis des noirs (Society of Friends of Blacks), with which he became associated.

== Career in revolutionary politics ==
Despite his status as a noble, de Ladebat was appointed to the Estates-General in 1789. However, as he refused to resign from his post in order to represent the nobility in his département, he was removed from office. While a member of the executive committee of the Gironde in 1790, he was elected to serve as its deputy to the Legislative Assembly, where he rejoined the moderate Feuillant royalist party. He presided over the Finance Committee and assumed the presidency of the Legislative Assembly in June 1792. On 20 June 1792, during the riots at the Tuileries Palace, he defended King Louis XVI of France and the royal family, an action that led to his arrest the following December.

Though released at the beginning of the Convention, de Ladebat was again imprisoned under the Reign of Terror as a suspect because of his connections with the Girondins. He escaped the Revolutionary Tribunal thanks to the government's reliance on his credit in order to finance its operations.

Finally, under the Executive Directory, he was elected a deputy on the Council of Ancients. De Ladebat represented a danger to individuals in compromising or corrupt positions of power in need of enormous financial support. His personal honesty, thoroughness, and devout Protestantism made him a serious challenge to the Directory. Along with Boissy d'Anglais, he unceasingly denounced licentiousness and bureaucratic waste.

== 18 Fructidor and exile ==
De Ladebat was President of the Council of Ancients at the time of the 18 Fructidor coup against the new moderate majority on the Councils. He was later deported to French Guiana with sixteen other deputies. He would remain in exile at Sinnamary for over two years with several other deportees, including General Pichegru. Of the sixteen deported to Sinnamary, eight died there or while escaping, six escaped successfully, and two were finally recalled to France.

== Return to France and retirement from politics ==
De Ladebat returned to France in February 1800 after intervention from the First Consul, Napoléon Bonaparte. After his return, several départements asked him to represent them in the Senate. However, he remained suspicious of Bonaparte, who had always blamed him for denouncing previous acts of violence in Italy, and had demanded his dismissal shortly before the events of 18 Fructidor. Suspicious of his independence, Bonaparte removed de Ladebat's name from the Senate roles. De Ladebat was the only surviving member of the 18 Fructidor plot to leave politics and return to commerce. Explaining his abstention from politics, he wrote: "In an arbitrary monarchy, the Jacobin anarchy, the confusion of the Directory and the military despotism, I saw nothing but contempt for the people."

== Later life and death ==
De Ladebat gained widespread recognition for his financial competence and ability after taking over the direction of the Banque Territoriale and organizing the final liquidation of the Caisse d'Escompte, a predecessor of the Banque de France.

He sought to repair the damage done to his finances following his deportation after 18 Fructidor; he reclaimed the remainder of his dispersed or confiscated assets and, notably, obtained compensation for the Sartine, one of his family-owned boats earlier requisitioned for use in the Indies.

During the Bourbon Restoration, he fell out of favor with the House of Bourbon. He also contributed to the establishment of the Caisses d'Epargne and philanthropic institutions. In 1818, he became the president of the Protestant Society of Forethought and Mutual Assistance and a member of the Society of Christian Morality. In 1821, he was among the founders of the Committee for the Abolition of Slavery, along with Auguste de Staël and Charles de Rémusat.

The same year, after a stay in England where he studied the new community and industrial organization systems implemented by Robert Owen at New Lanark, de Ladebat translated the works of Henry Grey Macnab, which relate and analyse his pioneering experiences working for the "Relief and most useful employment of the working class and the poor, and for the education of their children."

Shortly before his death in 1829, he assembled his notes from his deportation to Sinnamary, which would eventually be published by his grandson in 1912 under the title "Journal from my Deportation to French Guiana: Fructidor Year 5; Ventôse Year 8". He was buried at Père Lachaise Cemetery in Paris. His eulogy was delivered by François Guizot, then the President of the Conseil d'État.

== Sources ==
- Philippe de Ladebat: "Seuls les morts ne reviennent jamais : les pionniers de la guillotine sèche en Guyane française sous le Directoire" Editions Amalthée, Nantes France 1er trim. 2008..
- André-Daniel Laffon de Ladebat: "Journal de déportation et discours politiques", Edition revue et commentée, EDILIVRE Paris France, 2009..
- Memorial d'André-Daniel Laffon de Ladebat et correspondances manuscrites non-publiées (Archives familiales privées Laffon de Ladebat).
- Correspondances de déportation: Centre des Archives d'Outre-Mer, Aix-en-Provence, France.

Political offices
Preceded by Jean-Baptiste du Bayet	President of the Legislative Assembly; 1792	Succeeded by Jean-François Merlet
Preceded by Pierre Samuel du Pont de Nemours	President of the Council of Ancients; 1797	Succeeded by Jean-Antoine Marbot
