= Trecynon =

Village in Rhondda Cynon Taf, Wales

Coordinates: 51.721187°N 3.456308°W

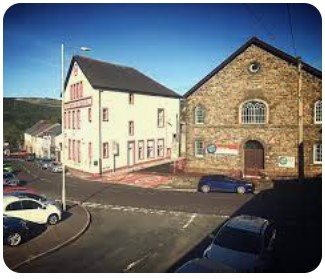
- Public Hall and Church, Trecynon

- Location within Rhondda Cynon Taf
- OS grid reference: SN995035
- Principal area: Rhondda Cynon Taf
- Preserved county: Mid Glamorgan
- Country: Wales
- Sovereign state: United Kingdom
- Post town: ABERDARE
- Postcode district: CF44
- Dialling code: 01685
- Police: South Wales
- Fire: South Wales
- Ambulance: Welsh
- UK Parliament: Merthyr Tydfil and Aberdare
- Senedd Cymru – Welsh Parliament: Cynon Valley

Trecynon is a village near Aberdare, situated in the Cynon Valley, Rhondda Cynon Taf, Wales. It dates from the early nineteenth century and developed as a result of the opening of the Aberdare Ironworks at Llwydcoed in 1800.

== Toponymy ==
Trecynon was formerly known as Heol-y-Felin (English: The Mill Road), as the early settlement was centred around the road leading to Llwydcoed Mill (the Heol-y-Felin road is known today in English as Mill Street).

With the opening of the ironworks at Llwydcoed in 1800, the settlement became an urbanised village, with housing and amenities (such as the 1855 Heolyfelin Chapel) built away from the Heol-y-Felin itself. As such, an eisteddfod competition was organised to decide a new name for the village, with the name Trecynon (English: Town on the Cynon) being declared the winner. From around 1860, the new name was widely adopted by both Welsh and English speakers; although Thomas Morgan recorded the village as still being named Heolyfelin in the 1887, despite the Mill itself no longer being extant.

== History ==
The first buildings in Trecynon were Llwydcoed Mill, the Hen-Dy-Cwrdd in 1751 and a single solitary house built next to it. Thomas Morgan states that first houses were built by Morgan Watkin in 1792, when the developing iron industry increased the demand for housing and the village of Heolyfelin began to grow. In 1811, the Robertstown Tramway Bridge, was built over the river Cynon, linking Heolyfelin and Robertstown. It is the oldest of its kind in the world.

By the 1860s, Heolyfelin had become one of the main population centres in the parish of Aberdare; Harriet Street, Ebenezer Street, Alma Street, Mount Pleasant Street and Margaret Street were all built in this period. Such rapid and intensive development inevitably led to public health problems, as were revealed in 1853 when Thomas Webster Rammell prepared a report for the general Board of Health on the condition of public health in Aberdare. Heolyfelin was not considered the worst case in the district, by any means, but there were concerns. John Griffith, Vicar of Aberdare, reported that:

There is not, to my knowledge, a place in Aberdare more filthy than the neighbourhood of the Royal Oak in the same quarter of the town. Mill-Street proper is in a very bad state from the ash-heaps of rubbish and filth thrown into and lying on the centre of the road.

—

Likewise, local industrialist Rees Hopkin Rhys reported:

Many of the houses in this quarter are of a very inferior description, and these have no privy accommodation whatever. The new houses, here, as a rule, have one privy for two houses.

Rammell's report led directly to the formation of the Aberdare Local Board of Health the following year. The Local Board, which later became the Aberdare Urban District Council, was responsible for a range of local improvements in Aberdare, including the opening of Aberdare Park in 1869.

Population continued to grow steadily in the late nineteenth and early twentieth century, as a result of the steam coal trade.

In August 1902, the foundation stone of the Trecynon Public Hall and Library was laid by Lord Windsor and D. A. Thomas, M.P. Funds for the construction of the Hall came from a variety of sources, including the Carnegie Fund and local coal-owners. The hall was opened officially on 10 March 1903, when a grand concert was organised.

The Coliseum Theatre was opened on 17 September 1938.

== Industry ==
The Aberdare Ironworks at Llwydcoed was the main employer in the early industrial period. The Ironworks closed in 1875 and, thereafter, coal became the main source of employment.

== Education ==
In 1848, the Aberdare British Schools (Ysgol-y-Comin) were built on an unenclosed area of Hirwaun Common; in 1896, the Aberdare Intermediate School was built on the Southern edge of Trecynon, to become Aberdare Boys County School from 1913.

The Aberdare College campus site of Coleg Morgannwg is situated within the northern part of the village, on Cwmdare Road.

Aberdare Boys Grammar School was opened in Trecynon in 1896 as Aberdare Intermediate School for both boys and girls; the girls transferred for their own new school at Plasdraw in 1913. The boys' school relocated to Cwmdare Road in 1964 and ceased to be a grammar school in 1978 when it became the new Aberdare Boys Comprehensive School, but changed its name to Aberdare High School in 2009; it closed in the summer of 2014.

Comin Infant school and Comin Junior School are located within the village; both school sites are physically connected.

== Religion ==
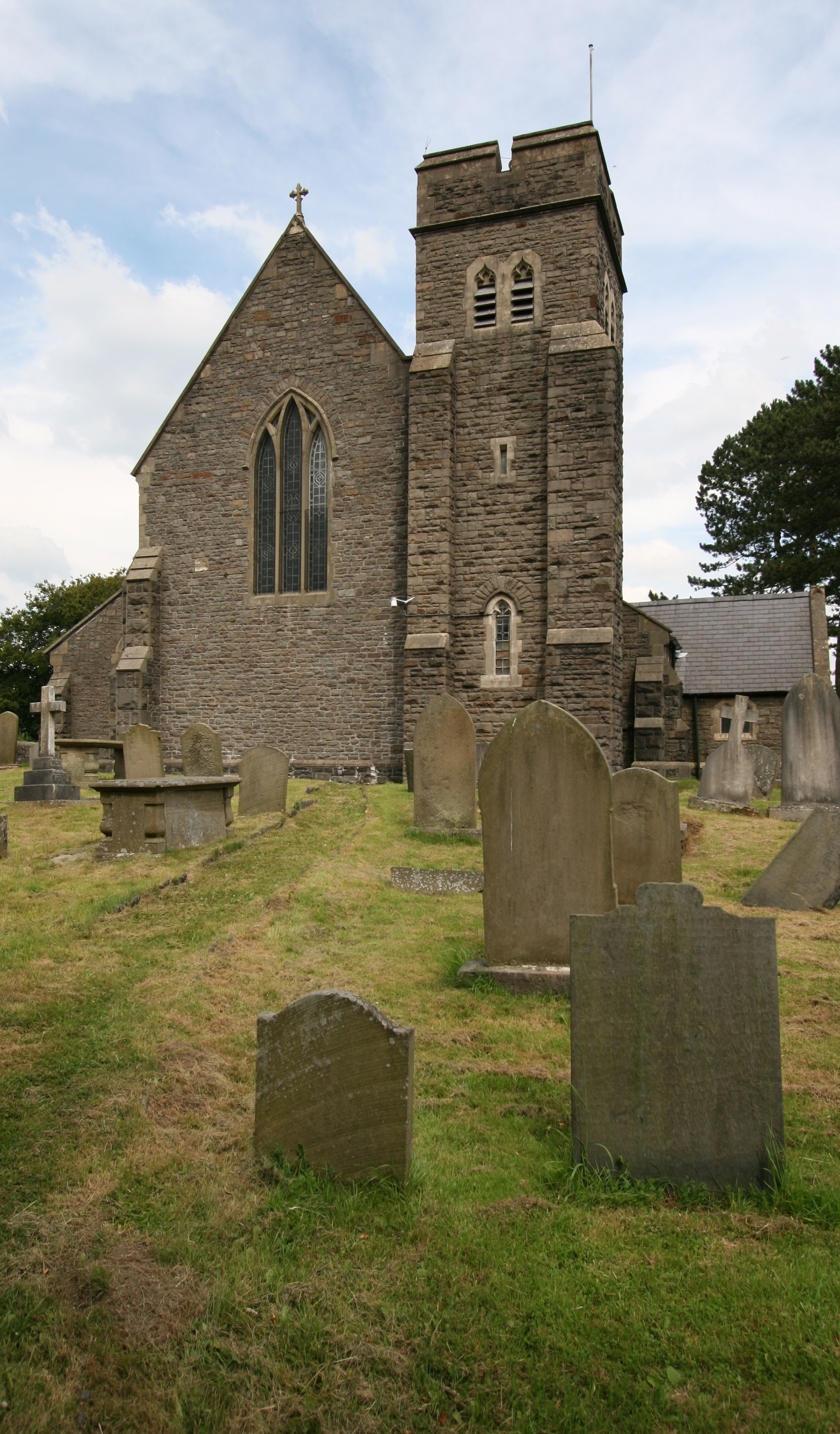
St Fagan's Church

The earliest building in Trecynon was Hen Dy Cwrdd Chapel, the oldest Nonconformist chapel in the Cynon Valley. Hen Dy Cwrdd Chapel was founded in 1751 and rebuilt in 1862. The chapel had two notable ministers during the nineteenth century. Thomas Evans (Tomos Glyn Cothi), minister from 1811 until 1833, was a political radical who was a pioneer in the political reform movement. His replacement, John Jones, minister from 1833 until 1863, was also a radical and was one of the founders of the magazine Yr Ymofynnydd, in which he published his radical ideas. Unitarians cared less for their buildings than other nonconformist denominations who built increasingly grandiose edifices, such as Calfaria, Aberdare. When the new building was opened in 1862, John Jones refused to hold a special service of consecration, as he considered such a service was too suggestive of "popery".

Although the building still survives, the chapel closed in the mid 1990s due to a declining congregation. It is hoped that an alternative use will be found for the chapel building in the future. No services are held at the chapel nowadays, but the building remains as a protected Grade II listed building.

St Fagan's Church is one of the oldest churches in the Aberdare district and was built in 1854 when John Griffith was vicar of Aberdare. It was built to serve the needs of the growing Anglican congregation in the upper Cynon Valley. The church was paid for by Harriet Windsor-Clive, Baroness Windsor and, when the church burnt down in 1856, was rebuilt again at her expense.

Each of the major nonconformist denominations established chapels at Trecynon. Ebenezer was one of the oldest Independent chapels in the locality. Heolyfelin was established in 1855 as a branch of the Baptist church at Hirwaun. Carmel was a Calvinistic Methodist chapel, as was Bryn Seion in Mill Street,

== Amenities ==
The most prominent local attraction and landmark is Aberdare Park, a popular public Victorian era park which was opened in 1869 on a 50-acre (200,000 m^{2}) site.

== Gallery ==
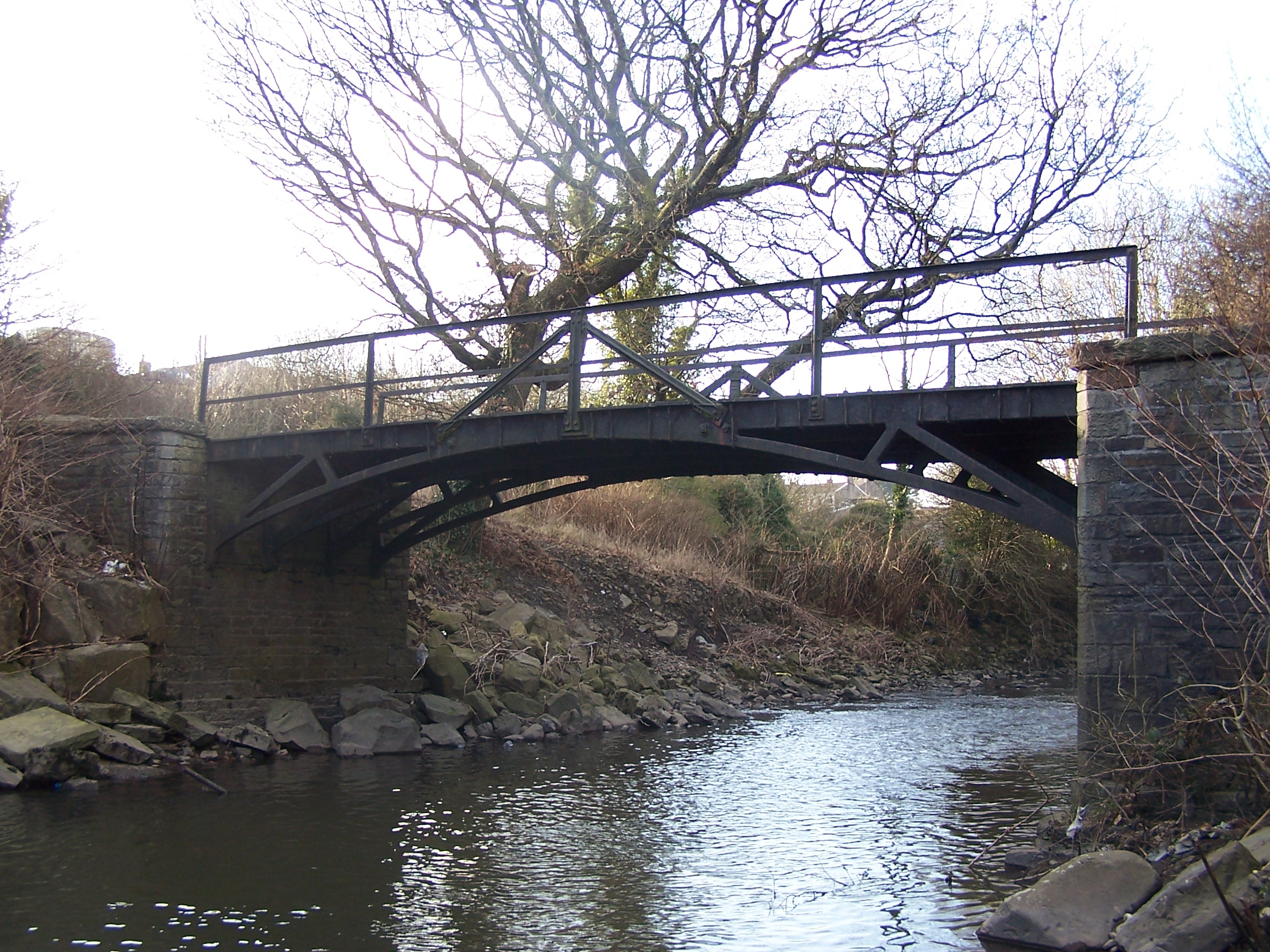
Trecynon's historic cast iron bridge

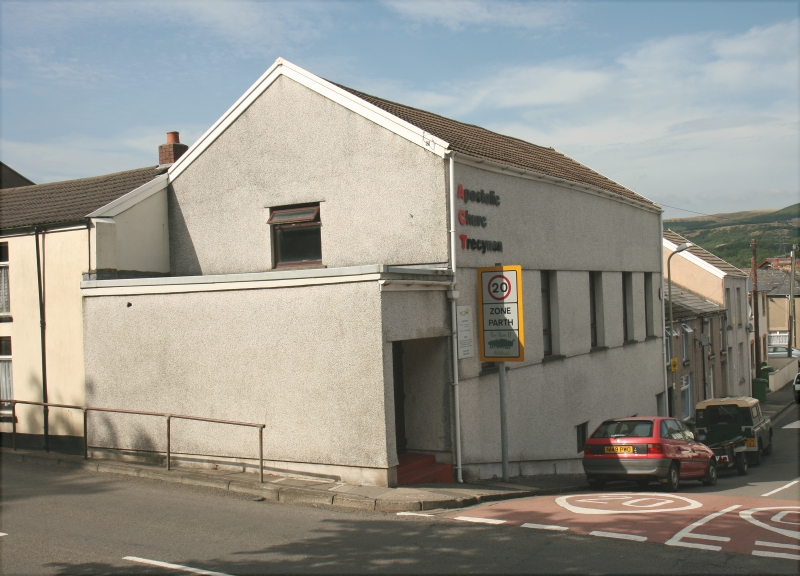
Apostolic Church, David Street, Trecynon

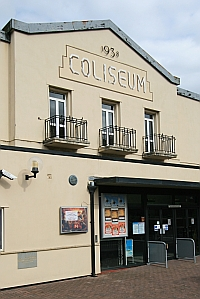
Coliseum Theatre, Trecynon, near Aberdare

== Notable people ==
- Gwyn Morgan, writer
- Mihangel Morgan, Welsh language writer and academic (born Michael Finch)
- Ieuan Rhys, actor (born Ieuan Evans)
- Griffith Rhys Jones, was a Welsh conductor of the famous 'Côr Mawr'

== See also ==
- Aberdare High School
- Coliseum Theatre (Aberdare)
