= Theophilus Lindsey =

English Unitarian theologian and clergyman (1723–1808)

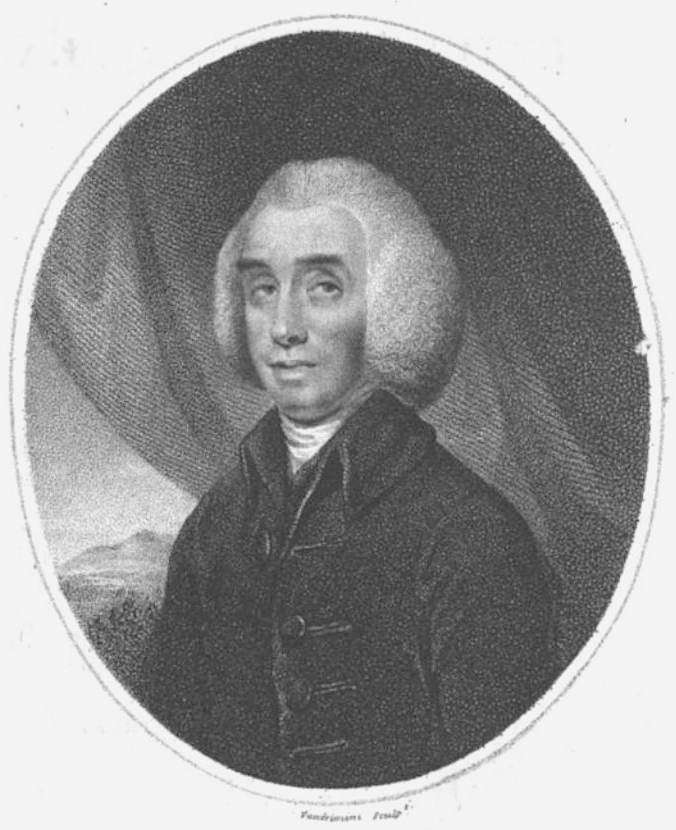
Theophilus Lindsey

Theophilus Lindsey (20 June 1723 O.S. – 3 November 1808) was an English theologian and clergyman who founded the first avowedly Unitarian congregation in the country, at Essex Street Chapel, London. Lindsey's 1774 revised prayer book based on Samuel Clarke's alterations to the 1662 Book of Common Prayer inspired over a dozen similar revisions in the succeeding decades, including the prayer book still used by the United States' first Unitarian congregation at King's Chapel, Boston.

== Early life ==
Lindsey was born in Middlewich, Cheshire, the son of Robert Lindsey, a mercer, and godson of Theophilus Hastings, 9th Earl of Huntingdon, for whose mother his mother had been a servant. He was educated at the Leeds Free School and at St John's College, University of Cambridge, where in 1747 he became a fellow.

Ordained deacon in 1746 and priest in 1747, Lindsey's church career advanced by aristocratic patronage. For some time he was a curate in Spitalfields, London, a position found for him by Lady Ann Hastings, aunt to the 9th Earl. The nomination was by Granville Wheler, Lady Ann's brother-in-law.

Lindsey was domestic chaplain to Algernon Seymour, 7th Duke of Somerset, who died in 1750. Then he was employed as tutor to the Duke's young grandson, Lord Warkworth—Hugh Percy, originally Hugh Smithson, the future 2nd Duke of Northumberland—from 1751 to 1753 travelling on the continent of Europe. Warkworth was destined for Eton College, and Lindsey turned down the post of accompanying him there which went to Charles Dodgson.

== Parish priest ==
Lindsey was then presented to the living of Kirkby Wiske in Yorkshire, by Hugh Percy, 1st Duke of Northumberland. He was present there in 1753–4.

After exchanging it for that of Piddletown in Dorset, in the gift of Francis Hastings, 10th Earl of Huntingdon, he rejected a chance to go to Dublin with the Duke of Northumberland, who became Lord Lieutenant of Ireland in 1762. At Piddleton he came to know Thomas Hollis of Corscombe, and through him William Harris, both dissenters. In 1760, he married Hannah Elsworth, step-daughter of Francis Blackburne, whom he had known since his time at Kirby Wiske.

== Vicar of Catterick ==
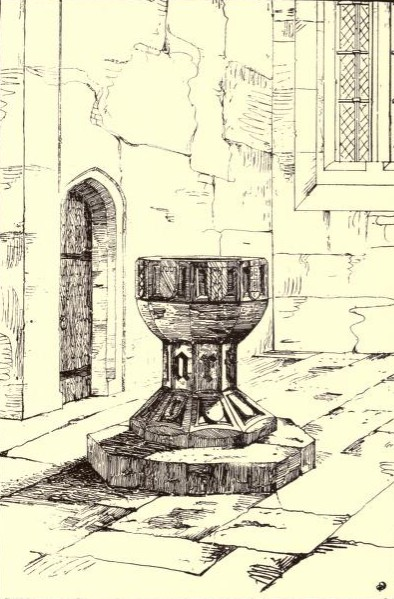
15th century font in the Church of St Anne, Catterick

In 1763 Lindsey went to the Church of St Anne, Catterick in North Yorkshire. He owed the living, in the gift of the Crown, to the influence of the Earl of Huntingdon.

According to Catharine Harrison, daughter of Jeremiah Harrison who had been the previous vicar, the wishes of Hannah Lindsey to be closer to her Blackburne relations had much to do with the move. The parish had at around this time about 400 households, and a local Catholic gentry family, represented by Sir Henry Lawson, 4th Baronet at Brough Hall. Lindsey was wary of Catholic influence. There was some Methodist belief, but hardly any dissenting nonconformity. Around 1764 Lindsey founded a Sunday school. Hannah ran a dispensary and encouraged inoculation.

Entertaining anti-Trinitarian views, Lindsey was troubled by their inconsistency with Anglican belief. On Lindsey's own account, he was influenced by William Robertson and his Attempt to explain the words reason, substance, person, creeds, orthodoxy, Catholic-church, subscription, and Index expurgatorius of 1766, with letter to his diocesan bishop from 1760 in the later editions. From 1769 the close friendship of Joseph Priestley served to foster Lindsey's scruples. Lindsey was writing to him in Leeds by 1772.

== The Feathers Tavern Petition ==
In 1771 Lindsey joined with Blackburne, John Jebb (1736–1786), Christopher Wyvill (1740–1822) and Edmund Law (1703–1787), bishop of Carlisle, in preparing a petition to Parliament. This petition, now called the Feathers Tavern Petition, prayed that clergymen of the Church of England and graduates of the universities might be relieved from the burden of subscribing to the Thirty-Nine Articles, and "restored to their undoubted rights as Protestants of interpreting Scripture for themselves".

Two hundred and fifty signatures were obtained, but in February 1772 the House of Commons declined even to receive the petition by a majority of 217 to 71; the adverse vote was repeated in the following year. At the end of 1773, Lindsey resigned as vicar of the Church of England. He became instead a leading Unitarian.

== Unitarian ministry ==
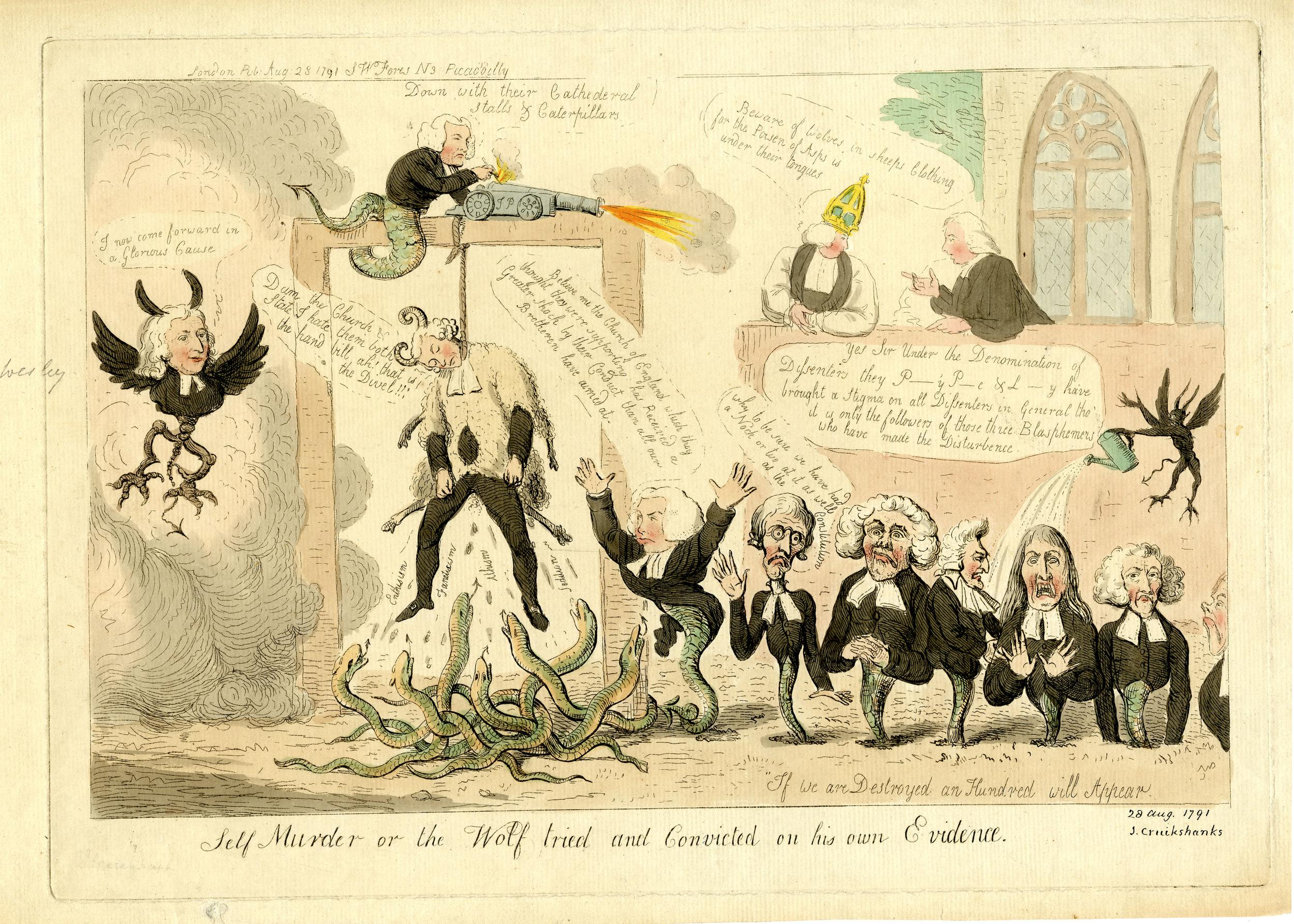
Self murder or the wolf tried and convicted on his own evidence (1791), a print by Isaac Cruikshank, depicting Joseph Priestley as a wolf in sheep's clothing and Lindsey with a serpent's body

On the way from Catterick to London, Lindsey and his wife stayed with William Turner in Wakefield, a minister whose beliefs had become Unitarian. His advice to Lindsey was to become likewise a dissenting minister. Alexander Gordon writing in the Dictionary of National Biography commented that Turner disapproved of Lindsey's idea of leading a secession from the Church of England.

Lindsey eventually acquired a copy of Samuel Clarke's altered prayer book from his brother-in-law John Disney. Therein, Lindsey found Clarke's many revisions, including references to the Trinity "slashed out with violent strokes". Lindsey was so impressed with Clarke's work that he intended to introduce the changes to his congregation at Catterick but ultimately decided against such action as he believed they would in violation of his vows to the Church of England. However, following his resignation from the church and influenced by John Jones's 1749 Free and Candid Disquisitions, he added further Unitarian alterations to Clarke's work and published them in 1774 as The Book of Common Prayer reformed according to the plan of the late Dr Samuel Clarke, publishing an enlarged edition in 1775. While Lindsey used Clarke's name, liturgist Ronald Jasper argued that little was borrowed from the 1724 alterations in producing the 1774 prayer book and that Lindsey's liturgy was more radical, with influence from William Whiston. With Lindsey's prayer book as inspiration, 15 liturgies based on the 1662 prayer book were published in England between 1792 and 1854 with similar Unitarian "modernizations". In 1785 in the United States, James Freeman created his own revised prayer based on Lindsey's 1774 book which is still used in its ninth edition by the King's Chapel congregation of Boston.

In April 1774 Lindsey began to conduct Unitarian services in a room in Essex Street, the Strand, London, where Essex Street Chapel was built. Among the trustees was Samuel Heywood. Here Lindsey remained till 1793 when he resigned his charge in favour of Disney, who like himself had left the established church and had become his colleague.

Lindsey helped to spread Unitarianism to Wales through his correspondence with Tomos Glyn Cothi. Later the Unitarian offices, first the British and Foreign Unitarian Association and then the General Assembly of Unitarian and Free Christian Churches, were established in Essex Street.

== Death ==
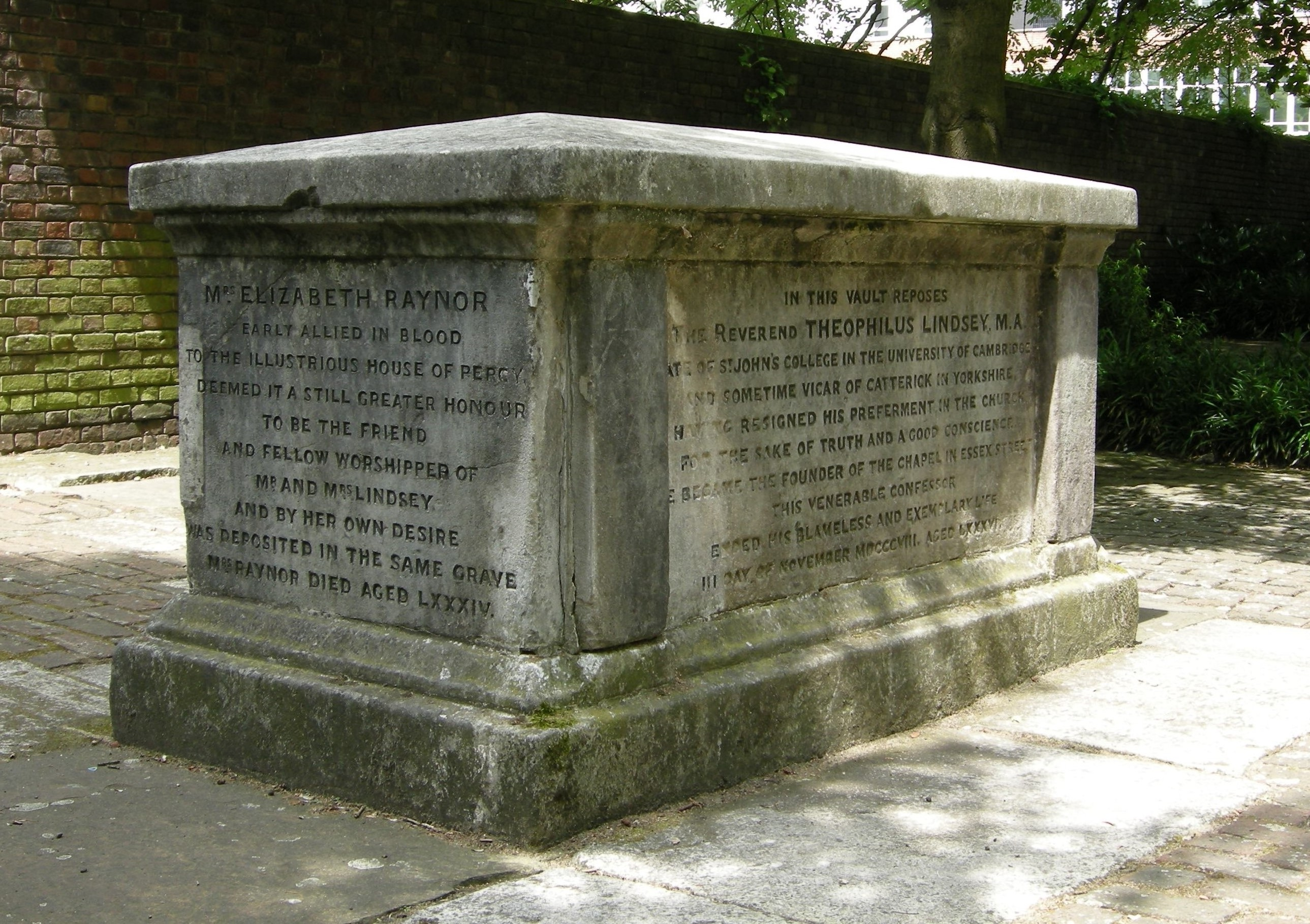
Tomb of Theophilus Lindsey (d. 1808), Elizabeth Rayner (d. 1800) and Thomas Belsham (d. 1829) in Bunhill Fields burial ground

In 1800 Lindsey received a considerable bequest from Elizabeth Rayner, a wealthy member of his congregation, and as a result his final years were spent in comfort. He died at home in Essex Street on 3 November 1808, and was buried in Bunhill Fields burial ground. By the request of Elizabeth Rayner, who had died in 1800, her remains were placed in the same grave. Lindsey was succeeded as minister at Essex Street from 1805 by Thomas Belsham, who wrote Lindsey's biography (published in 1812), and who, following his own death in 1829, was also buried in the same grave.

== Works ==
Lindsey's major work was An Historical View of the State of the Unitarian Doctrine and Worship from the Reformation to our own Times (1783). It was written in response to the Plea for the Divinity of Christ of the Baptist minister Robert Robinson. There was a 1785 reply to it, arguing against Lindsey's use of Abraham Tucker's views on the Trinity, by Thomas Kynaston as "A Layman", on behalf of Tucker's daughter. Lindsey's other publications included:

- The Apology of Theophilus Lindsey: on Resigning the Vicarage of Catterick (1774). Lindsey cited in this work John Oldfield, an ejected minister of the 17th century. A reply of the same year, A Vindication of the Doctrine and Liturgy of the Church of England, came from George Bingham, with criticism of Lindsey's history of the early Church as Socinian. The layman William Burgh replied also in 1774 on the divinity of Christ, with A scriptural confutation of the arguments against the one Godhead of the Father, Son, and Holy Ghost produced by the Rev. Mr Lindsay.
- A Sequel to the Apology (1776). It includes an account of the trial of Edward Elwall.
- The Book of Common Prayer, reformed according to the plan of the late Dr Samuel Clarke (1774). Samuel Clarke (1675–1729), a cleric and philosopher with views close to those of Isaac Newton, left manuscript comments on the Book of Common Prayer that were given by his son to the British Museum, in 1768. Lindsey returned several times to revisions of this prayer book, for the Essex Street Chapel, after John Disney had copied out the comments. By 1789 he removed the Apostles' Creed. His work influenced also Presbyterians, who published five liturgies based on it in the years 1776 to 1791.
- Dissertations on the Preface to St John's Gospel and on praying to Jesus Christ (1779)
- Vindiciae Priestleianae (1788), defending Joseph Priestley against George Horne, and asserting the continuity of Unitarianism with the latitudinarian tradition within the Church of England in general, and John Tillotson in particular.
- Conversations upon Christian Idolatry (1792)
- Conversations on the Divine Government, shewing that everything is from God, and for good, to all (1802).

Two volumes of sermons, with prayers annexed, were published posthumously in 1810.

Thomas Belsham's Memoirs of the Late Reverend Theophilus Lindsey, M.A., including a brief analysis of his works; together with anecdotes and letters of eminent persons, his friends and correspondents; also a general view of the progress of the Unitarian doctrine in England and America appeared in 1812.

== Family ==
In 1760 Lindsey married Hannah Elsworth (1740–1812), stepdaughter of Francis Blackburne.
