= Merlet (surname) =

Merlet is a French surname. Notable people with the surname include:

- Agnès Merlet (born 1959), French film director
- Dominique Merlet (born 1938), French pianist, organist and music educator
- Michel Merlet (1939–2026), French composer and pedagogue
- Myriam Merlet (1956–2010), Haitian politician, scholar and economist

== See also ==
- Jean-François Honoré, baron Merlet (1761–1830), French statesman
