= Pierre-Édouard Lémontey =

French politician and historian

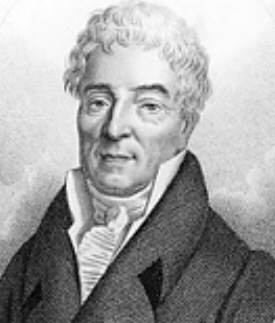
Pierre-Édouard Lémontey

Pierre-Édouard Lémontey (14 January 1762, Lyon – 26 June 1826, Paris) was a French lawyer, politician, scholar, and historian.

== Life ==
Lémontey was born in Lyon and became a barrister.

On the convocation of the États généraux, he was noted for many political writings. Deputy for the Rhône at the Legislative Assembly, he was elected its president several times. He took part in the defence of Lyon against the troops of the National Convention and in 1793 escaped death during the Reign of Terror by fleeing to Switzerland. Lémontey returned in 1795 and was in 1804 made head of the theatrical censorship commission, entering the Académie française in 1817.

He was twice a laureate of the Académie de Marseille for his Éloges praising Peiresc (1785) and those praising Cook (1788). He edited royalist newspapers and was one of the companions at the "Déjeuner de la Fourchette".

== Main works ==
- Palma, ou le Voyage en Grèce, opéra en deux actes, Paris, Théâtre de la rue Feydeau, 5 fructidor an 6 (1798)
- Raison, folie, chacun son mot, petit cours de morale mis à la portée des vieux enfans (1801)
- Irons-nous à Paris ? ou la famille du Jura (novel written on the occasion of Napoleon I of France's coronation) (1804)
- La Vie du soldat français, en 3 dialogues composés par un conscrit du département de l'Ardèche (1805)
- Thibaut, ou la Naissance d'un comte de Champagne, poème en 4 chants, sans préface et sans notes, traduit de la langue romance, sur l'original composé en 1250, par Robert de Sorbonne, clerc du diocèse de Rheims (1811)
- Essai sur l'établissement monarchique de Louis XIV, et sur les altérations qu'il éprouva pendant la vie de ce Prince (1818) - both praised and controversial on its publication, it was a forerunner of L'Ancien Régime et la Révolution by Tocqueville and underlined the continuity between the institutions of the Ancien Régime and those of the French Revolution. He interpreted this continuity as a result of Louis XIV's absolutism.
- De la Peste de Marseille et de la Provence pendant les années 1720 et 1721 (1821)
- Œuvres, édition revue et préparée par l'auteur (13 vol.) (1829)
- Histoire de la Régence et de la minorité de Louis XV jusqu'au ministère du cardinal de Fleury (1832)
