= Caradog (Griffith Rhys Jones) =

Welsh conductor

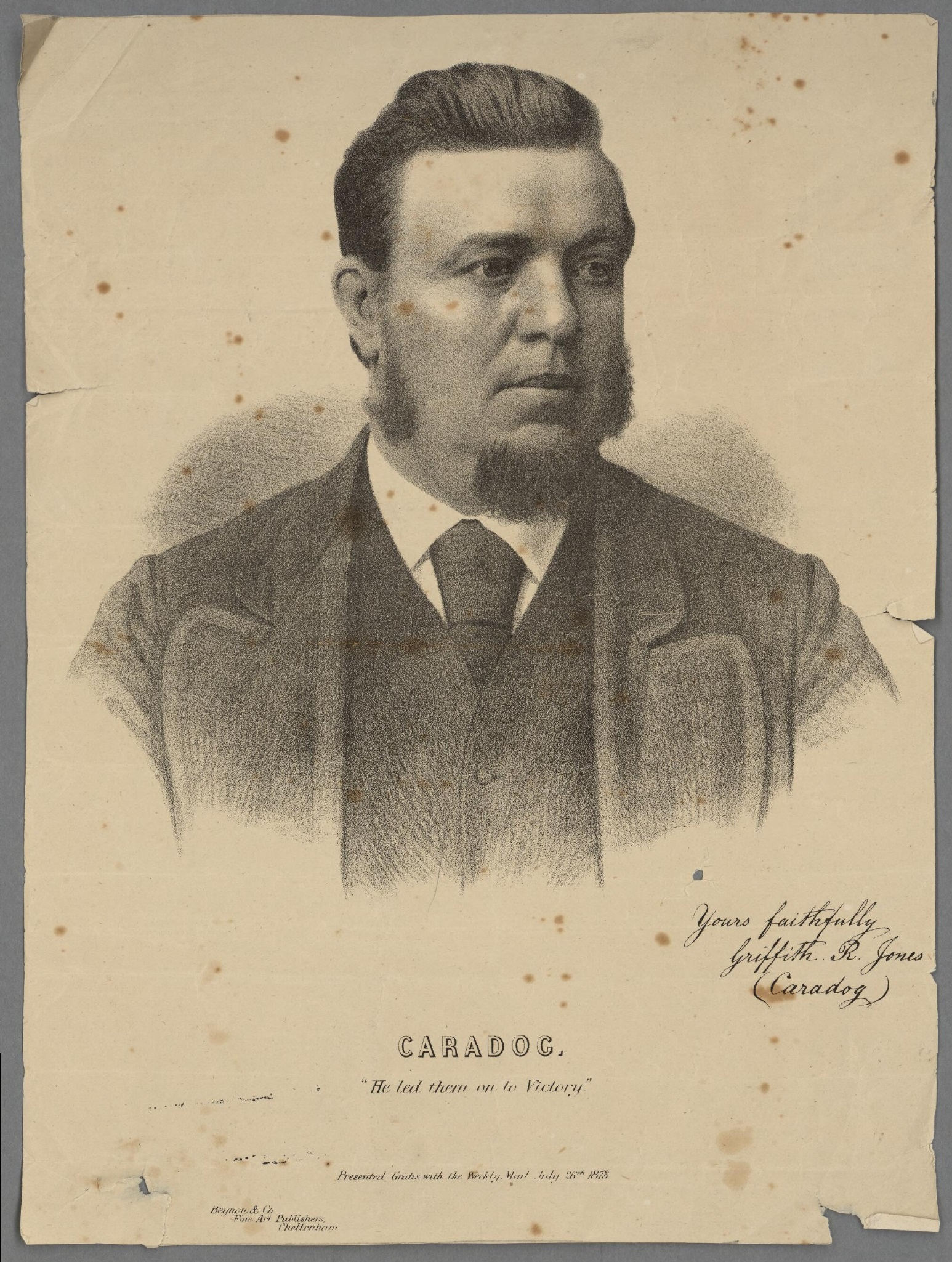
- Signed lithograph of Caradog
- Born: Griffith Rhys Jones; 21 December 1834; Trecynon, Aberdare, Wales
- Died: 12 December 1897 (aged 62); Pontypridd
- Resting place: Aberdare cemetery
- Occupations: Conductor, musician and Blacksmith
- Known for: Welsh choral music

Griffith Rhys Jones (21 December 1834 – 4 December 1897), commonly known as Caradog, was a Welsh conductor of the famous 'Côr Mawr' of some 460 voices (the South Wales Choral Union), which twice won first prize at The Crystal Palace choral competitions in London in 1872 and 1873.

Griffith Rhys Jones was born at the Rose & Crown Tavern in Trecynon, near Aberdare. He worked as a blacksmith at the Aberdare Ironworks in the village of Llwydcoed and was a member of the Unitarian chapel at Hen-Dy-Cwrdd. Following the success of "Côr Caradog", a massed choir of voices sourced from throughout South Wales, he formed other choirs, notably at Treorchy.

He was buried at Aberdare Cemetery, near Trecynon.

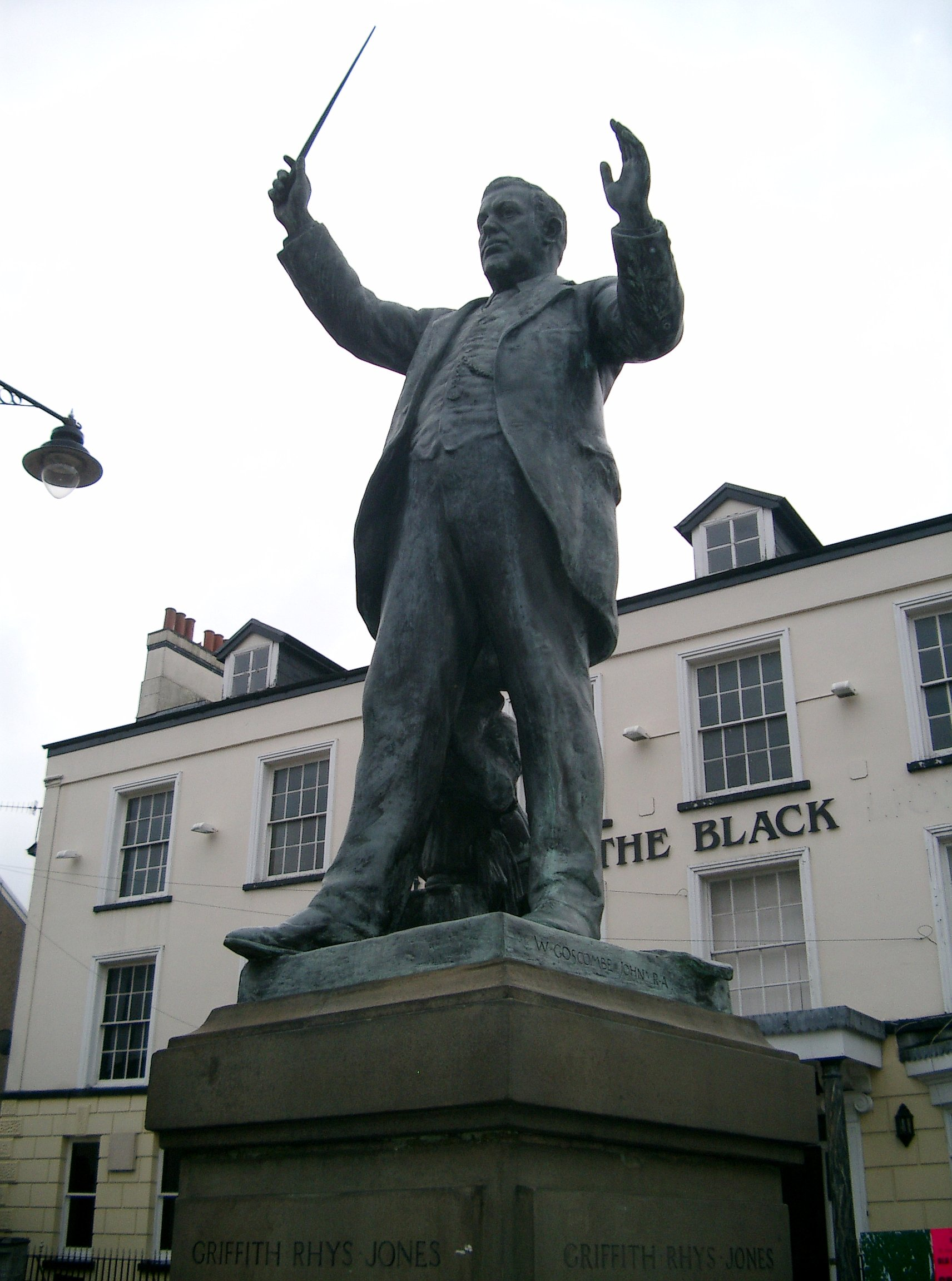
Statue by Goscombe John in Aberdare, erected 1920

In 1920 a statue designed by Sir William Goscombe John was erected in his honour in Victoria Square, Aberdare.
