= Mihangel Morgan =

Welsh writer

Mihangel Morgan (born Michael Finch on 7 December 1955 in Trecynon, near Aberdare, Rhondda Cynon Taf) is a Welsh author.

== Background and career ==
He changed his name from Michael Finch to Mihangel Morgan in his early twenties, taking his mother's maiden name. His work often reflects Welsh academia and the crisis of Welsh culture and many actual figures are easily recognised in some of his works. References to key moments in Welsh literature speckle his work; e.g. Dan Gadarn Goncrit is a reference to the Artist in Philistia theme from a political Welsh poem about Saunders Lewis. Born in the village of Trecynon, near Aberdare in South Wales, he lectures in 20th-century Welsh literature, working for the Welsh Department at Aberystwyth University.

Morgan is considered to be "one of Wales's leading Welsh language novelists".

He lives near the small village of Tal-y-bont, Ceredigion.

== Bibliography ==
- Diflaniad Fy Fi (Cyhoeddiadau Barddas, 1988) poems
- Beth yw Rhif Ffôn Duw? (Cyhoeddiadau Barddas, 1991) poems
- Hen Lwybr A Storïau Eraill (Gomer, 1992) short stories
- Dirgel Ddyn (Gomer, 1993) novel
- Saith Pechod Marwol (Y Lolfa, 1993) 'sin'-themed short stories
- Te Gyda'r Frenhines (Gomer, 1994) gay-themed short stories
- Tair Ochr y Geiniog (Gomer, 1996) gay-themed short stories
- Jane Edwards (Gwasg Pantycelyn, 1996) academic study
- Melog (Gomer, 1997) novel
- Darllen Ffilmiau (Prifysgol Cymru Aberystwyth, 1998) academic study
- Dan Gadarn Goncrit (Y Lolfa, 1999) novel
- Y Corff Yn Y Parc (Gwasg Carreg Cwalch, 1999) short stories
- Caradog Prichard (Gwasg Pantycelyn, 2000) academic study
- Cathod a Chŵn (Y Lolfa, 2000) short stories
- Modrybedd Afradlon (Gomer, 2000) short story
- Creision Hud (with Jo Feldwick) (Y Lolfa, 2001) poems for children
- Y Ddynes Ddirgel (Y Lolfa, 2001) novel
- Pan Oeddwn Fachgen (Y Lolfa, 2002) novel
- Croniclau Pentre Simon (Y Lolfa, 2003) novel
- Digon O Fwydod (Cyhoeddiadau Barddas, 2005) poems for children
- Cestyll yn y Cymylau (Y Lolfa, 2007) novel
- Pantglas (Y Lolfa, 2011) novel
- 60 (Y Lolfa, 2017) novel
