= Jacques-Alexandre Laffon de Ladebat =

French shipbuilder and merchant (1719–1797)

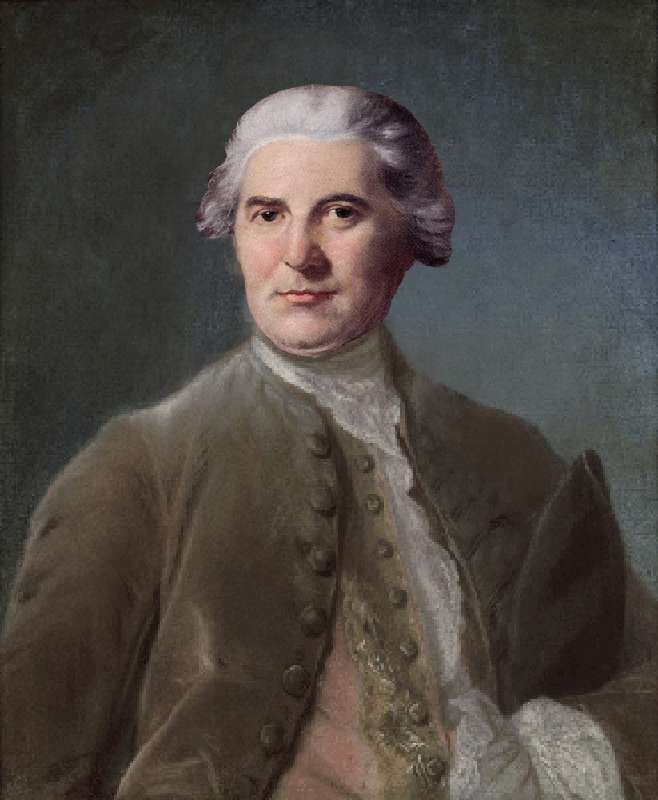
Portrait of Jacques-Alexandre Laffon de Ladebat

Jacques-Alexandre Laffon de Ladebat (2 January 1719 – 18 November 1797) was a prominent shipbuilder and merchant of the port of Bordeaux in the late 18th century. His son, André-Daniel Laffon de Ladebat (November 30, 1746 – October 14, 1829), succeeded him, and later became involved in politics. In 1789, he participated in the French Revolution.

He was born on 2 January 1719 in the Netherlands to Daniel Laffon de Ladébat and Jeanne Nairac. His family, being Protestant, had fled to the Netherlands following revocation of the Edict of Nantes (1685).

Following the death of Louis XIV, Ladébat was able to return to France without fear of religious persecution. There, he and his brother established a business as wine merchants and maritime traders through the network of correspondents that they had developed in the Netherlands.

In 1755, Ladébat began to trade in the colonies of the French West Indies and, from 1764, this included the slave trade. In 1769, it is speculated that he was no longer content to trade in naval weapons and wine, he created a sugar plantation in the French colony of Saint-Domingue, and began clearing and cultivating land in Bordeaux by buying several hundred acres straddling Pessac and Merignac. He built a model farm called "Bellevue," which produced grain, flour, wine, lumber, silkworms and trained farm hands.

He was ennobled and granted a coat-of-arms in 1773 for his economic successes. His grant of arms symbolized his areas of success: "Azure, a gushing fountain of money surmounted by a golden sun with two anchors." The motto "Soyez Utile" accompanied the arms.
