= D. Jacob Davies =

Welsh Unitarian minister

D. Jacob Davies (5 September 1916 – 11 February 1974) was a Welsh Unitarian minister who became a prominent figure within Welsh public life and within his denomination in Wales and beyond.

== Early life ==
Jacob Davies was born on 5 September 1916 at Penlon, Tregroes, near Llandysul, one of the five children of David and Mary Davies. He was educated at Tregroes Primary School before earning a scholarship to Llandysul Grammar School in 1929, where he remained until 1936. He then became a student at Carmarthen Presbyterian College to prepare for the Unitarian ministry. After some years in Carmarthen he became minister of the Capel Bach, the Unitarian chapel in Aberystwyth, where he enrolled as a student at the University and graduated in 1945.

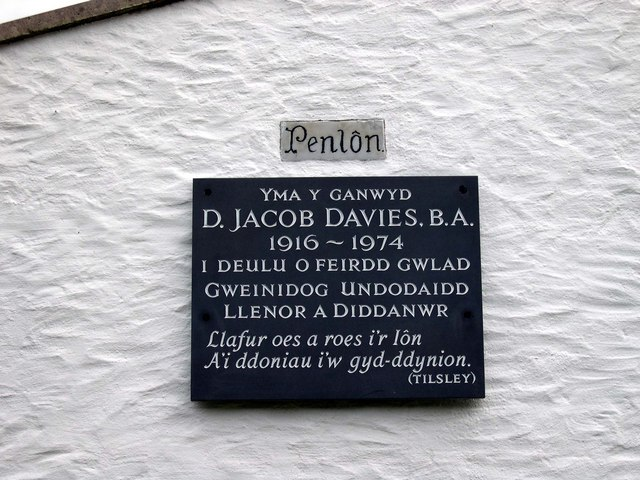
Memorial to Jacob Davies at his childhood home

== Hen-Dy-Cwrdd ==
Although Davies had intended to study for an MA degree, he received a call to minister the Unitarian churches at Highland Place, Aberdare and Hen-Dy-Cwrdd, Trecynon. The latter was the oldest nonconformist place of worship in the Aberdare Valley. As well as his duties as a minister, Davies played a wider role in the life of Aberdare, including supporting the movement to establish a Welsh-medium primary school, Ysgol Gymraeg Aberdar.

== Return to Cardiganshire ==
In 1957, Jacob Davies returned to his native area to minister the three Unitarian churches at Alltyblacca; Capel y Bryn, Cwrtnewydd and Cwmsychbant. He remained there until his death in 1974.

Davies was an active broadcaster, writer and journalist, and edited the Unitarian journal, Yr Ymofynnydd. He was an active campaigner for pensioners' rights and the Pensioner of Wales from 1955 until 1973. He was in demand to preside at the National Eisteddfod of Wales and the Llangollen International Eisteddfod. Politically, Davies supported Plaid Cymru, and unsuccessfully stood as a candidate in the inaugural Dyfed County Council election in 1973. He finished fourth with 21% of the vote.

Together with these various activities, Davies was prominent in his denomination beyond Wales and at the time of his death was President of the General Unitarian Assembly.

== Death ==
Davies died suddenly on 11 February 1974. He was buried four days later at Bwlchydadfa Cemetery, Talgarreg.

== Sources ==
=== Books and Journals ===
- Jones, Alan Vernon (2004). Chapels of the Cynon Valley. Cynon Valley Historical Society. ISBN 0953107612.

=== Online ===
- Evans, D.J. Goronwy (25 March 1983). "Cofio Jacob Davies". Cambrian News. Archived from the original on 18 August 2016.
