= Bryn Seion Chapel =

Chapel in Trecynon, Rhondda Cynon Taf, Wales

Coordinates: 51.721920°N 3.458409°W

Bryn Seion, Trecynon was a Calvinistic Methodist chapel in Mill Street, Trecynon, Aberdare, Wales. Services at Bryn Seion were conducted in the Welsh language until it became a Baptist chapel in 1970.

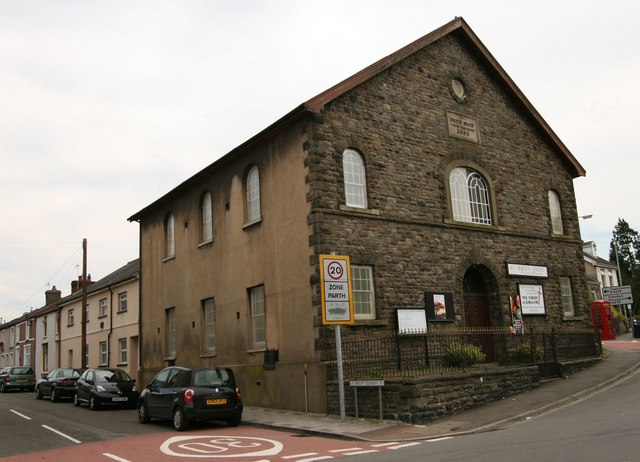
Bryn Seion chapel in 2008

== Early history ==
The cause at Bryn Seion commenced in Pentwyn Bach as a result of the 1859 Religious Revival. The chapel was opened for worship in 1862 and rebuilt in 1899 at a cost of £580.

== The 1904-05 Religious Revival ==
Bryn Seion was the first chapel in the Cynon Valley to be visited by the revivalist leader, Evan Roberts. On 13 November 1904, Roberts conducted services at Bryn Seion, refusing to preach from the pulpit but addressing the congregation from the sedd fawr and recounting his experiences when the revival broke out in his home town of Loughor. This services continued throughout the day. For many weeks afterwards the church at Bryn Seion was profoundly affected by the revival.

== Later history ==
The cause at Bryn Seion came to an end in 1970 but the building was taken over by Carmel English Baptist church and remained in use in the twenty first century.

== Bibliography ==
- Jones, Alan Vernon (2004). Chapels of the Cynon Valley. Cynon Valley Historical Society. ISBN 0953107612.
