= Elizabeth Rayner =

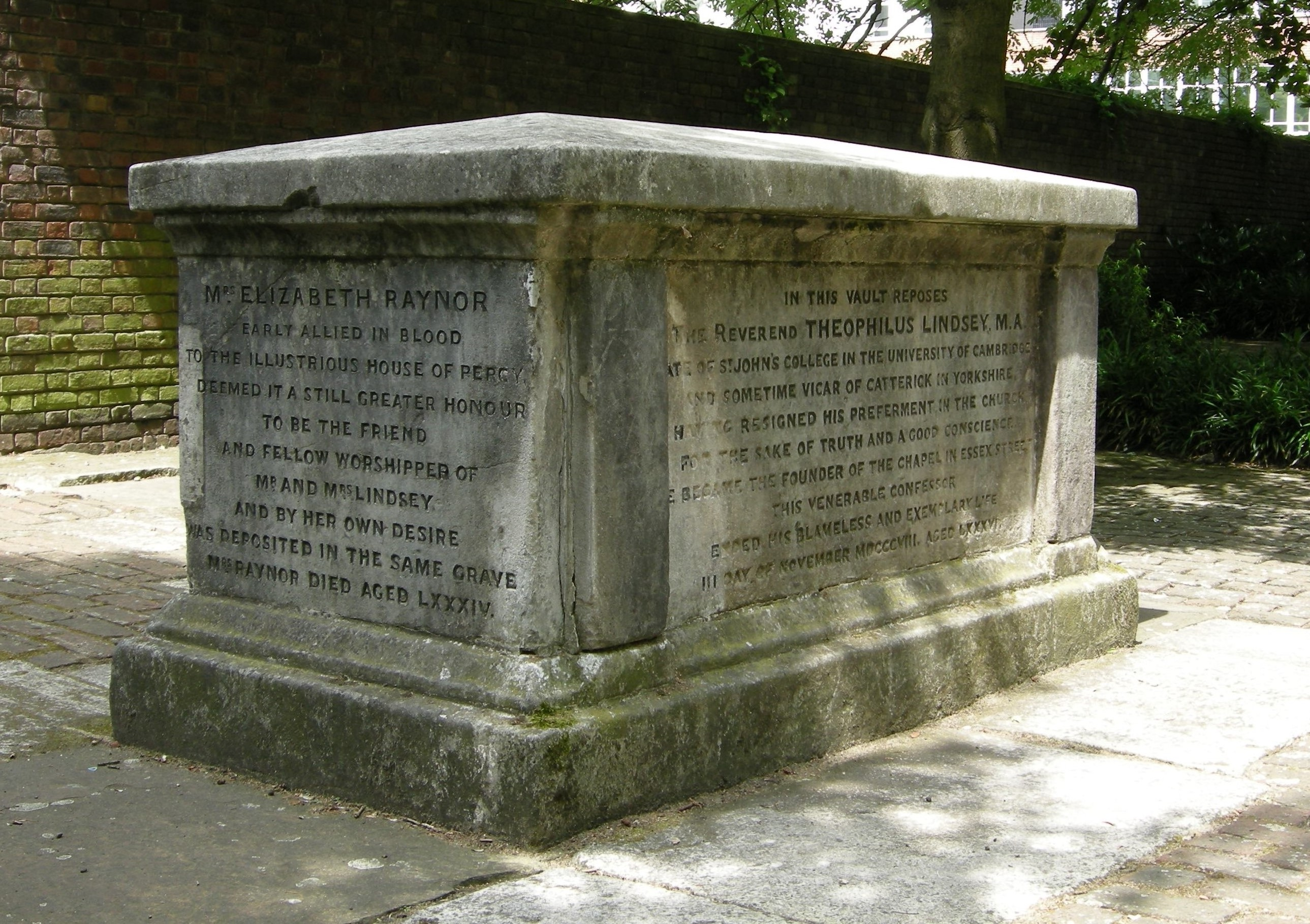
Tomb of Theophilus Lindsey (d. 1808), Elizabeth Rayner (d. 1800) and Thomas Belsham (d. 1829) in Bunhill Fields burial ground

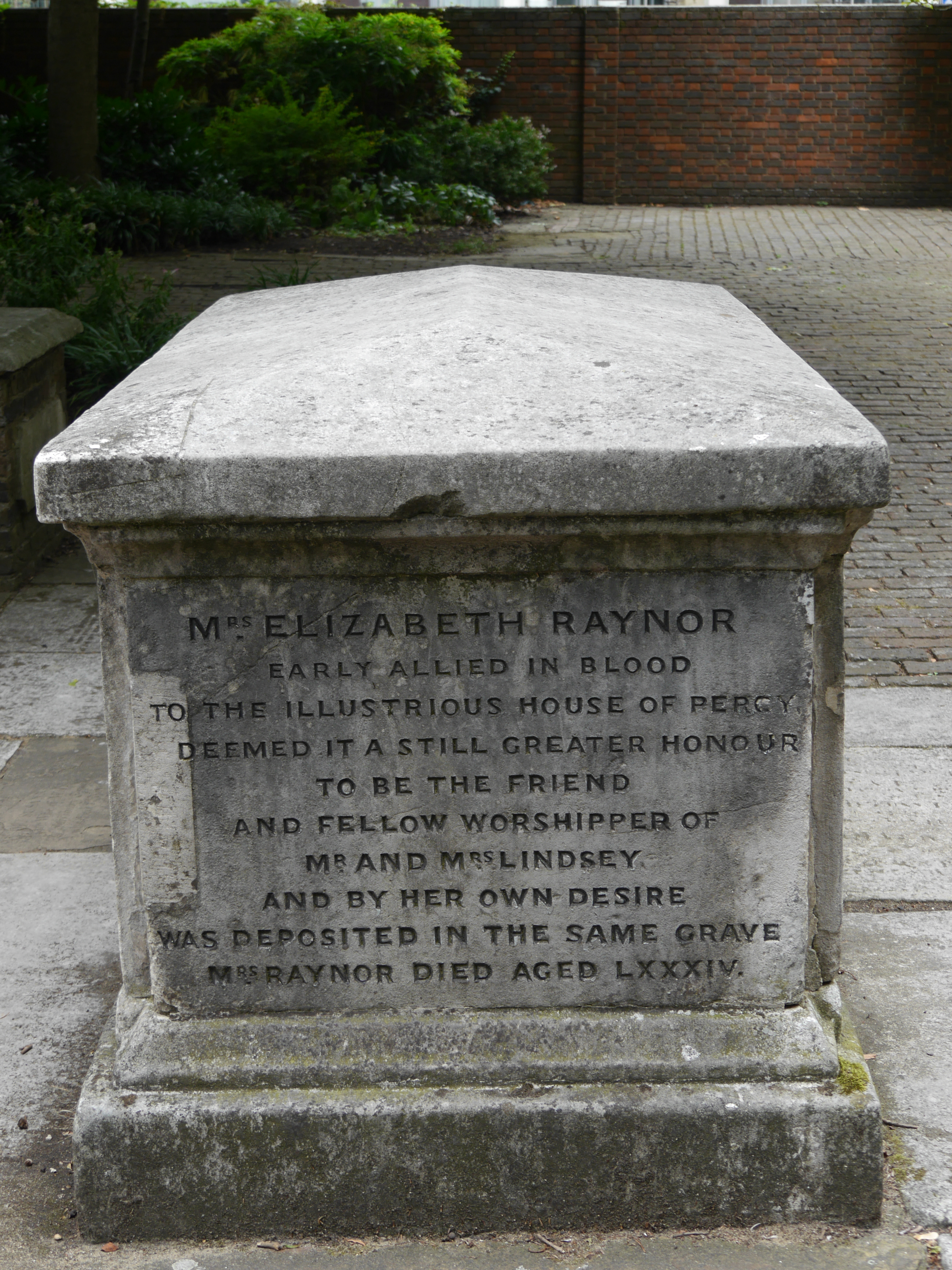
Elizabeth Rayner details

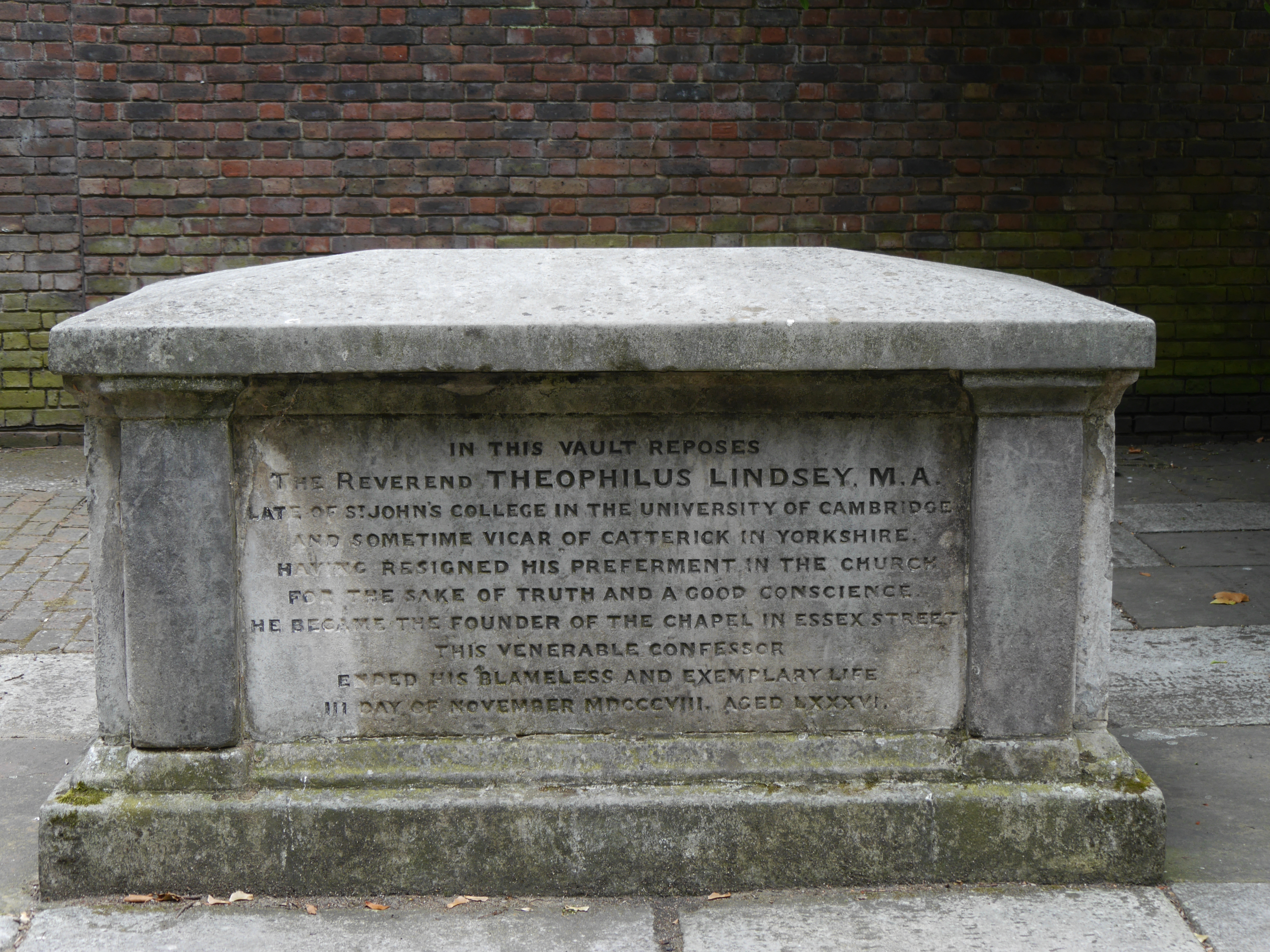
Theophilus Lindsey details

Elizabeth Rayner or Raynor, née Collier (1714–1800) was a British Unitarian benefactress.

== Life ==
She was born Elizabeth Collier, the daughter of Jonathan Collier of Dalston (1676–1751), mercer and a Director of the South Sea Company. Through her sister Susanna Collier, Mrs John Lewis, Mrs Rayner was the great-aunt of Peter Burrell Jr.; his second daughter, Isabella, married Lord Algernon Percy, and his third daughter, Frances, married Hugh Percy, later 2nd Duke of Northumberland.

Elizabeth married widower John Rayner (d. 1777) in 1754.

Elizabeth Rayner converted to Unitarianism on hearing Theophilus Lindsey preach, following which, she became a regular attendant at Essex Street Chapel. She was a generous friend and benefactress to Unitarian causes.

She became acquainted with Joseph Priestley when he was preparing to move to Birmingham in 1779. She contributed towards the cost of his move, and gave him annual gifts of £50, as well as bearing the full cost of publishing his History of Early Opinions Concerning Christ (1786), which is dedicated to her. In addition, at his request, she set aside some stocks for his son, Joseph Priestley Jr., to purchase a partnership.

When William Winterbotham was incarcerated for four years in Newgate prison for allegedly uttering the phrase "French Revolution" and criticising the slave trade, Rev. Lindsey and Mrs Rayner were a constant support. Winterbotham subsequently named his two eldest sons Rayner Winterbotham (1798–1879) and Lindsey Winterbotham (1799–1871), respectively.

== Death ==
Elizabeth Rayner died at her home in Titchfield Street on 11 July 1800, aged 84. In her will, she asked for a simple burial, in a lead-lined coffin in "Mr Lindsay's vault", in Bunhill Fields. She made numerous bequests, including £2,000 in public stock to Dr Priestley, and a separate bequest for his son William.
