= Coliseum Theatre (Aberdare) =

Performing arts venue in Trecynon, Wales

Coordinates: 51.721°N 3.456°W

The Coliseum Theatre is a performing arts venue in the village of Trecynon, near the town of Aberdare, Wales. It is run by Rhondda Cynon Taf County Borough Council.

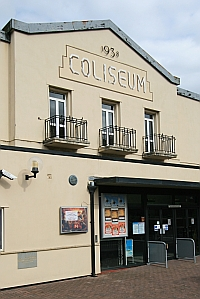
Coliseum Theatre, Aberdare

It was officially opened on Saturday, September 17, 1938. Aberdare Coliseum has a 600-seat auditorium and cinema.

Crass played their final gig there.

== Stereophonics signed at Coliseum ==
The Stereophonics from nearby Cwmaman got their first big break after a concert at the Coliseum Theatre. In March 1996, a rock gig was held at the Coliseum Theatre featuring up and coming Welsh bands Catatonia, along with local bands Krazy Keyboards (later to become Dylan Thorn), Pocket Devils and Tragic Love Company (a.k.a. the Stereophonics). Famous rock band manager John Brand attended the concert to see the Pocket Devils, but was so impressed with the Tragic Love Company (Stereophonics) he signed them. Three months later and the Stereophonics would sign their record deal with Richard Bransons V2 label.
