= Thomas Evans (Tomos Glyn Cothi) =

Welsh poet and activist (1764–1833)

Thomas Evans (Tomos Glyn Cothi) (20 June 1764 – 29 January 1833), was a Welsh poet, Unitarian, and political activist.

== Early life and work ==
Evans, son of Evan and Hannah Evans, was born at Capel Sant Silyn, Gwernogle, Carmarthenshire. His birthplace was not far from the Cothi River, from which he later took his bardic name, Tomos Glyn Cothi. He seems to have had little early education. But by following his craft as a weaver, he was a trader in woollen cloth and he frequented the fairs of Glamorgan. In this way he came into contact with the poets of Glamorgan and their bardic traditions. He was at the gorsedd of Mynydd y Garth in the midsummer of 1797. He also had access to books, and Theophilus Lindsey assisted by sending him English books from 1792 until 1796.

== Religious affiliations ==
Evans lived in an area which was predominantly Calvinist, but as early as 1786 he began to preach having embraced the doctrines of Unitarianism. He was nicknamed "Priestley Bach" (Little Priestley) due to his enthusiasm for the doctrines set forth by Joseph Priestley. In order to worship with friends of like sentiments, he used to walk to Alltyblaca, twelve miles away. When he grew up, he began to preach in his father's house, a part of which he got licensed for the purpose. In time, a chapel was built. He was personally much respected, but his liberalism made him suspected by government.

== Imprisoned for a song ==
Evans spoke warmly and wrote largely. In 1797 he was apprehended, tried, and sentenced by Judge Lloyd to be imprisoned for two years in Carmarthen gaol and to stand in the pillory. Two accounts have been published about the precise nature of his crime. Williams (1908) documented in 'Thomas Evans and the song on liberty', his contribution to By-Gones: 'In 1797 he was asked in the company of many friends to sing a song on "Liberty." He continued:

'It is stated in Hanes Emynwyr Cymru (W.A. Griffiths) that the song which he sang was a translation in English of the French song "Carira"; others state that it was "Can Rhyddid," found on pages 127-8 of Y Geirgrawn for the year 1796. This "Can Rhyddid" appears to be a Welsh version of "Ca ira," for in the introduction to the song in Y Geirgrawn it is stated that "the undefeated forces of the French State are indebted to it in a large measure for their noblest victories."'

Bowen (1992) stated that Evans was charged with translating La Marseillaise, the French national anthem into Welsh, the fourth stanza of which ran:

'And when upon the British shore
The thundering guns of France shall roar,
Vile George shall trembling stand,
Or free his native land
With terror and appal,
Dance Carmagol, dance Carmagol.'

During his imprisonment, Evans was met with great sympathy.

== Hen-Dy-Cwrdd ==
In 1811, Evans became the minister of the Old Meeting House, Aberdare, where he remained until his death on 29 January 1833. He was interred at the northern pine-end of the chapel. The chapel, which was rebuilt in 1862, has a monument to Evans in the lobby.

== Literary work ==
Evans' first publication was probably a translation of Priestley's Triumph of Truth, being an Account of the Trial of Elwall for publishing a book in Defense of the Unity of God, 1793. Altogether, he published more than twenty works, most of them theological. In 1795, he issued No. 1 of a quarterly magazine, The Miscellaneous Repository, which had to be discontinued with No. 3 for lack of sufficient support. In 1809, he published an English-Welsh dictionary, compiled while in prison. In 1811, he published a hymn-book of a hundred hymns, all original. A second edition appeared in 1822.

George (1933) includes a list of Evans' published works and manuscripts that are held in the National Library of Wales, Aberystwyth.

== Publications ==
- Evans, Thomas (1809). An English-Welsh dictionary. Merthyr Tydfil. hdl:10107/4860636 – via National Library of Wales.
- Evans, Thomas; Richards, Thomas (1804). An English and Welch vocabulary, or, An easy guide to the antient British language. Merthyr Tydfil. hdl:10107/4799128 – via National Library of Wales.

== Notes ==
=== References ===
- Bowen, Geraint (1992). "Gorsedd y Beirdd - From Primrose Hill 1972 to Aberystwyth 1992". Transactions of the Honourable Society of Cymmrodorion: 115-139.
- Cadw. "Hen Dy Cwrdd Chapel (10876)". National Historic Assets of Wales.
- George, Irene (1933). "Tomos Glyn Cothi". Journal of the Welsh Bibliographical Society. IV (3): 105-112.
- Owen, John Dyfnallt (1959). "Evans, Thomas (Tomos Glyn Cothi)". Dictionary of Welsh Biography. National Library of Wales.
- Williams, R. Peris (1908). "Thomas Evans and the song on liberty". By-Gones (November 11): 321.

=== Further reading ===
- Löffler, Marion (2013). "The 'Marseillaise' in Wales". In Constantine, Mary-Ann; Johnston, Dafydd (eds.). Footsteps of liberty and revolt. Cardiff: University of Wales Press. ISBN 978-0-7083-2590-2.
