= Thomas Belsham =

English Unitarian minister (1750–1829)

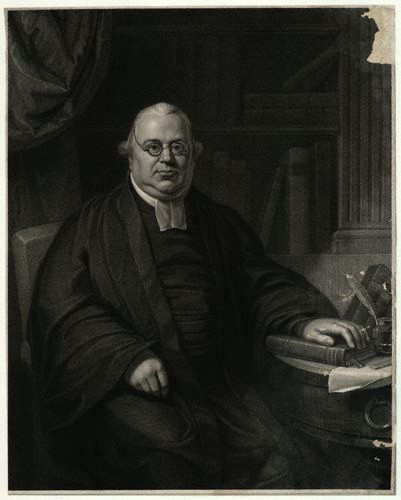
Thomas Belsham

Thomas Belsham (26 April 1750 – 11 November 1829) was an English Unitarian minister.

== Life ==
Belsham was born in Bedford, England, and was the elder brother of William Belsham, the English political writer and historian. He was educated at the dissenting academy at Daventry, where for seven years he acted as assistant tutor. After three years spent in a charge at Worcester, he returned as head of Daventry Academy, a post which he continued to hold till 1789, when, having adopted Unitarian principles, he resigned. With Joseph Priestley for colleague, he superintended during its brief existence the New College at Hackney, and was, on Priestley's departure in 1794, also called to the charge of the Gravel Pit congregation. In 1805, he accepted a call to the Essex Street Chapel, which was also headquarters and offices of the Unitarian Church under John Disney, there succeeding as minister Theophilus Lindsey who had retired and died three years later in 1808.

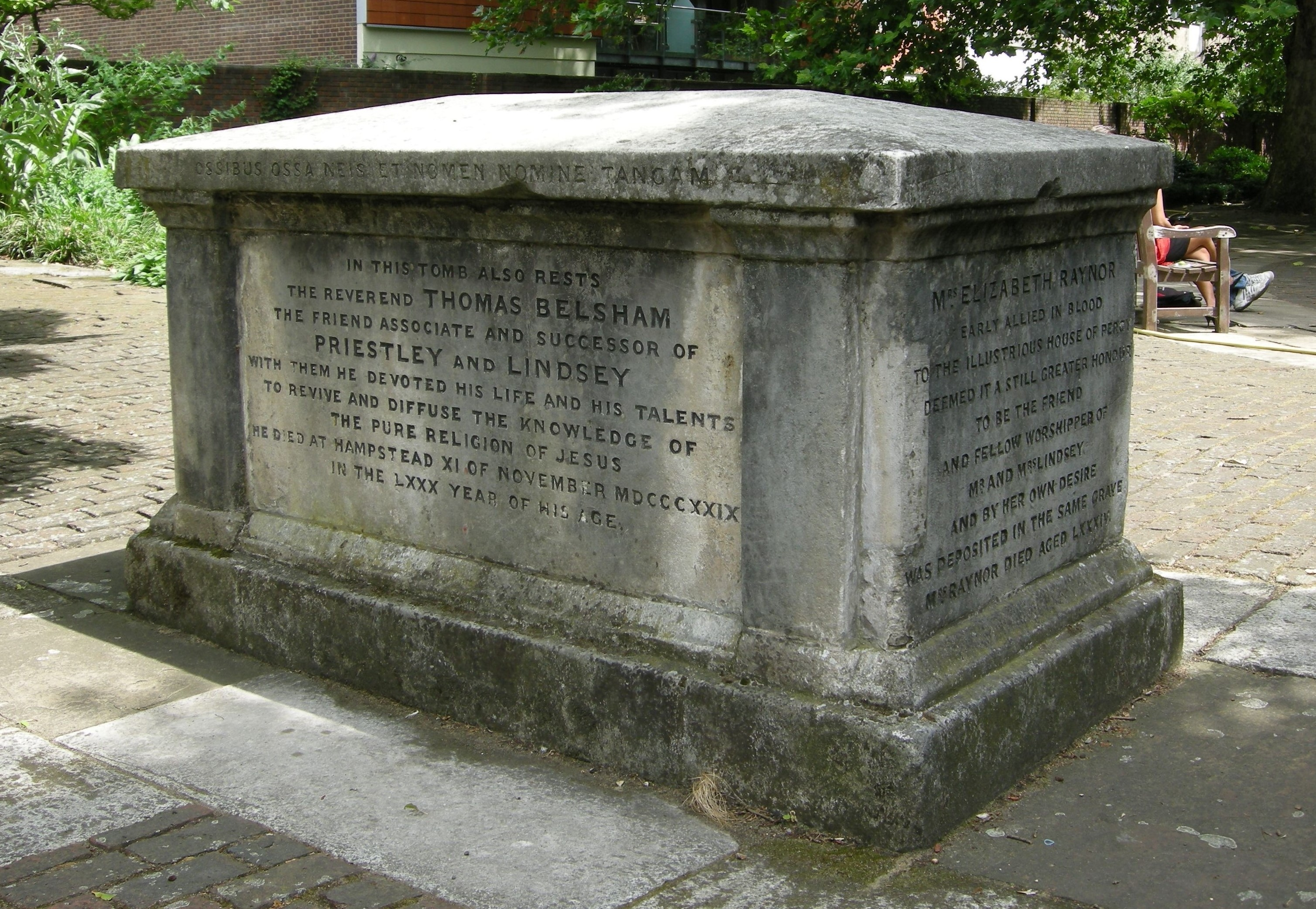
Tomb of Theophilus Lindsey (died 1808), Elizabeth Rayner (died 1800) and Thomas Belsham (died 1829) in Bunhill Fields burial ground

Belsham remained at Essex Street, in gradually failing health, until his death in Hampstead, on 11 November 1829. He was buried in Bunhill Fields burial ground, in the same tomb as Theophilus Lindsey. His joint executors were Thomas Field Gibson and his father.

== Beliefs ==
Belsham's beliefs reflect that transition that the Unitarian movement was going through during his lifetime, particularly from the early Bible-fundamentalist views of earlier English Unitarians like Henry Hedworth (who introduced the word "Unitarian" into print in English from Dutch sources in 1673) and John Biddle, to the more Bible-critical positions of Priestley's generation. Belsham adopted critical ideas on the Pentateuch by 1807, the Gospels by 1819, and Genesis by 1821. Later, following Priestley, Belsham was to dismiss the virgin birth as "no more entitled to credit, than the fables of the Koran, or the reveries of Swedenborg." (1806)

== Works ==
Belsham's first work of importance, Review of Mr Wilberforces Treatise entitled Practical View (1798), was written after his conversion to Unitarianism. His most popular work was the Evidences of Christianity; the most important was his translation and exposition of the Epistles of St Paul (1822). He was also the author of a work on philosophy, Elements of the Philosophy of the Human Mind (1801), which is entirely based on Hartley's psychology.

In 1812 Belsham published the Memoirs of the Late Reverend Theophilus Lindsey, M.A., his predecessor at Essex Street. This included a chapter titled "American Unitarianism" arguing that many American clergy entertained Unitarian views. The Calvinist minister Jedidiah Morse published the chapter separately, as part of his campaign against New England's liberal ministers—contributing to "the Unitarian Controversy" (1815) that eventually produced permanent schism among New England's Congregationalist churches.

His main Christological work was A Calm Inquiry into the Scripture Doctrine concerning the Person of Christ (1817).

Belsham was one of the most vigorous and able writers of his church, and the Quarterly Review and Gentlemans Magazine of the early years of the 19th century abound in evidences that his abilities were recognized by his opponents.

Thomas Belsham took credit for the anonymously published 1808 The New Testament, in an Improved Version, upon the Basis of Archbishop Newcome's New Translation. This text's rendering of John 1:1 (Note: THE Word was in the beginning and the Word was with God and the Word was a god.) has been cited since the 1950s by the Watchtower Society in defense of their rendering (Note: "Originally the Word was, and the Word was with God, and the Word was a god." — 1950 NWT "In the beginning was the Word, and the Word was with God, and the Word was a god" — 2013 NWT) of the same passage.
