= Hen-Dy-Cwrdd =

Former Unitarian chapel in Trecynon, Wales

Coordinates: 51.7213°N 3.4559°W

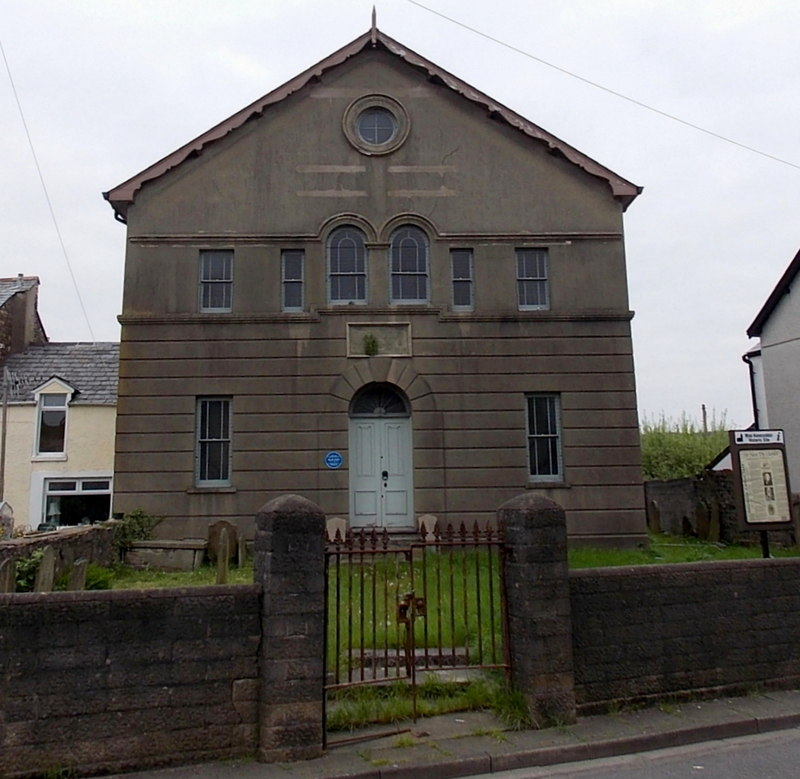
Hen-Dy-Cwrdd

Hen-Dy-Cwrdd (The Old Meeting Place) is a disused Unitarian chapel in Trecynon, Aberdare, Wales. Services at the chapel were conducted in the Welsh language.

== Origins and early history ==
With the exception of the twelfth century St John's Church, Hen-Dy-Cwrdd was the oldest place of worship in the Aberdare parish and the only nonconformist chapel to pre-date the industrial revolution. It was established in 1751, by members of the Cwm-y-glo chapel on Merthyr mountain and on land leased from Theophilus Richards. Hen Dy Cwrdd was the third daughter church established, following those at Cefn in 1747 and at Ynysgau in 1749. The original chapel resembled a modest cottage or inn with an outside staircase. It could hold a congregagation of between fifty and a hundred people, and by 1853 it had a membership of sixty.

A number of radical ministers have served at Hen-Dy-Cwrdd. These included Thomas Evans, also known as Tomos Glyn Cothi, a weaver from the Teifi Valley who played a prominent role in the development of Unitarianism in his native area. During the early years of the nineteenth century Evans attracted the attention of the authorities due his Jacobin sympathies, which included the translation of La Marseillaise into Welsh. Ultimately this led to his imprisonment in Carmarthen Gaol in 1811. After his release he was invited to be minister at Hen-Dy-Cwrdd and remained until his death in 1833.

Tomos Glyn Cothi was succeeded by John Jones who ministered for thirty years until his death in 1863. Jones was also prominent in radical politics and wrote for the Welsh Chartist publication, Udgorn Cymru. In 1847, he was one of the founders of Yr Ymofynydd, a Unitarian denominational journal. The journal is still published in the twenty-first century.

== The new chapel ==
In 1861, the original structure was demolished and replaced by a much larger chapel which, although designed to be simple, resembled many other nonconformist chapels of the era.

== Twentieth century ==
In 1916, Hen-Dy-Cwrdd extended an invitation to E.R. Dennis (1882-1949), a native of Aberdare and minister of Glanrhondda Chapel, Pentre, to become minister of Hen-Dy-Cwrdd. The new minister had been brought up at Siloa, Aberdare but his theological views had undergone a change when he was a student at Carmarthen Presbyterian College, and he became a Unitarian. He was inducted as minister at services geld on 1 May 1916, which also included the annual meeting of the South Wales Unitarian Association, during which D.R. Llewelyn of Aberdare was elected president.

Dennis remained minister at Hen-Dŷ-Cwrdd for over thirty years. He was active in supporting music and drama and was one of the founders of the Theatr Fach at Aberdare.

Dennis was succeeded in 1945 by D. Jacob Davies (1916-1974). Davies was a poet and pacifist who became prominent in Welsh public life as a journalist and broadcaster. He was editor of Yr Ymofynnydd for over twenty years and wrote the bicentennial history of Hen Dŷ Cwrdd.

== Prominent members ==
Prominent members of Hen-Dy-Cwrdd include the musician and conductor Griffith Rhys Jones(Caradog), Rhys Hopkin Rhys, landowner and coal agent and W.W. Price, historian of the Aberdare Valley.

== Later history ==
The chapel itself closed in 1994 but the cause was maintained by the transfer of the members to Highland Place Chapel, Aberdare, which continued to be ministered by Eric Jones until his retirement in 2004.

Following the closure of the chapel, the building was acquired by the Welsh Religious Buildings Trust in 2005. Efforts are currently being made to restore the building.

== Sources ==
=== Books and journals ===
- Jones, Alan Vernon (2004). Chapels of the Cynon Valley. Cynon Valley Historical Society. ISBN 0953107612.

=== Online ===
- "Hen Dŷ Cwrdd Trecynon". The Story of Nonconformity in Wales. Welsh Religious Buildings Trust.
