= Tregroes =

Village in Ceredigion, Wales

Coordinates: 52.077790°N 4.325338°W

- Location within Ceredigion
- OS grid reference: SN 4074 4471
  - Cardiff: 64.1 mi (103.2 km)
  - London: 183.6 mi (295.5 km)
- Community: Llandysul
- Principal area: Ceredigion
- Country: Wales
- Sovereign state: United Kingdom
- Post town: Llandysul
- Postcode district: SA44
- Police: Dyfed-Powys
- Fire: Mid and West Wales
- Ambulance: Welsh
- UK Parliament: Ceredigion Preseli
- Senedd Cymru – Welsh Parliament: Ceredigion

Tregroes (Welsh for 'Settlement of the Cross') is a hamlet in the community of Llandysul, Ceredigion, Wales, which is 64.1 miles (103.2 km) from Cardiff and 183.6 miles (295.5 km) from London. Tregroes is represented in the Senedd by Elin Jones (Plaid Cymru) and is part of the Ceredigion Preseli constituency in the House of Commons.

== See also ==
- D. Jacob Davies
- T. Llew Jones
- List of localities in Wales by population
