= Legislative Assembly (France) =

Legislature from October 1791 to September 1792

Legislative Assembly Assemblée législative
- Kingdom of France
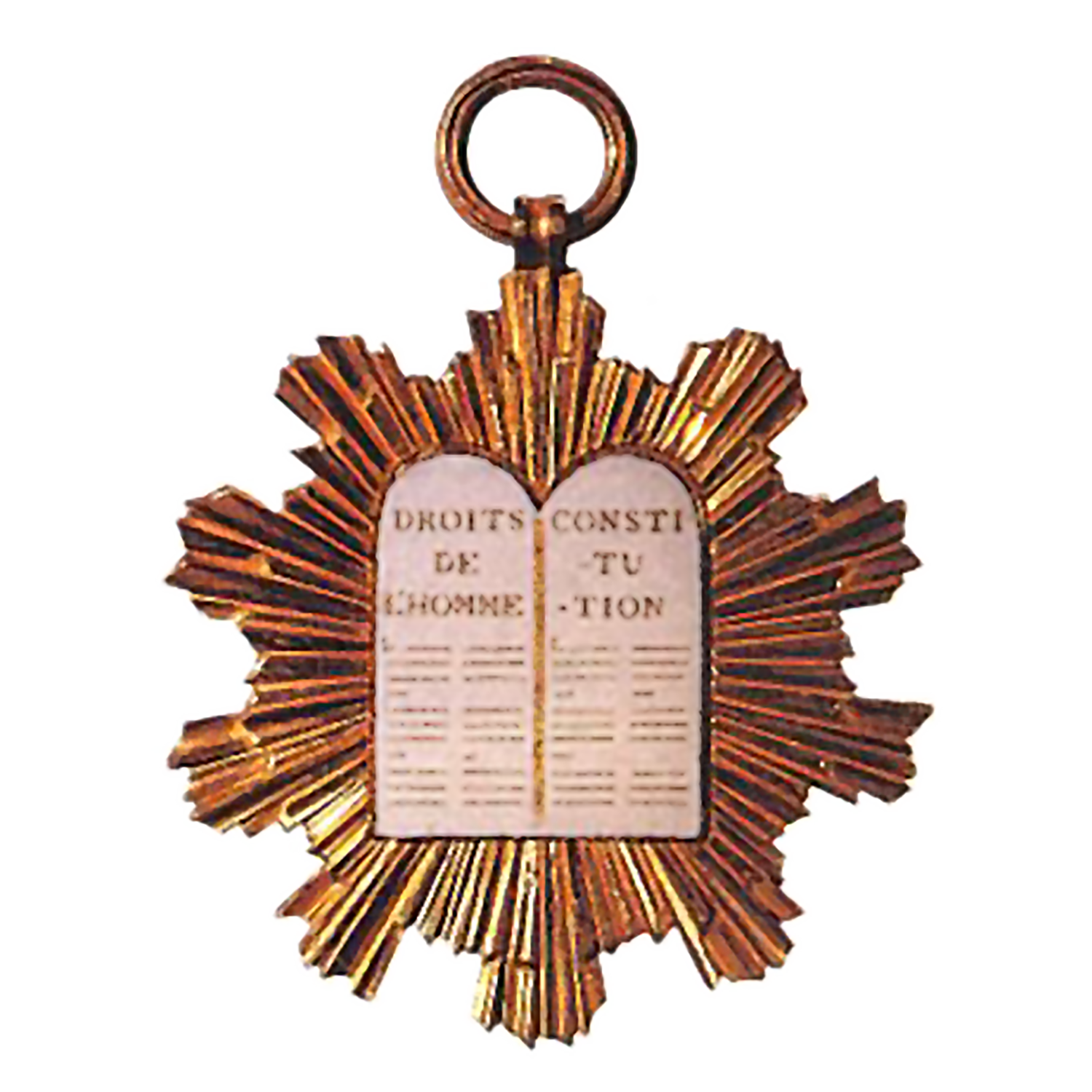
- Medal of the Legislative Assembly

Type
- Type: Unicameral

History
- Established: 1 October 1791
- Disbanded: 20 September 1792
- Preceded by: National Constituent Assembly
- Succeeded by: National Convention
- Seats: 745

Meeting place
- Salle du Manège, Paris

The Legislative Assembly (French: Assemblée législative, [asɑ̃ble leʒislativ]) was the legislature of the Kingdom of France from 1 October 1791 to 20 September 1792 during the years of the French Revolution. It provided the focus of political debate and revolutionary law-making between the periods of the National Constituent Assembly and National Convention. The Legislative Assembly saw an unprecedented turnover of four ministers of Justice, four ministers of the Navy, six ministers of the Interior, seven ministers of Foreign Affairs, and eight ministers of War.

== History ==
=== Background ===
The National Constituent Assembly dissolved itself on 30 September 1791. Upon Maximilien Robespierre's motion, it decreed that none of its members would be eligible for the next legislature. Its successor body, the Legislative Assembly, operating over the liberal French Constitution of 1791, lasted until 20 September 1792 when the National Convention was established after the insurrection of 10 August just the month before.

The Legislative Assembly entrenched the perceived left–right political spectrum that is still commonly used today. There were 745 members.

== Elections ==
The elections of 1791, held by census suffrage, brought in a legislature that desired to carry the Revolution further. The rightists within the assembly consisted of 264 Feuillants, whose chief leaders, Gilbert du Motier de La Fayette and Antoine Barnave, remained outside the House because of their ineligibility for re-election. They were staunch constitutional monarchists, firm in their defence of the king against the popular agitation.

The leftists were of 136 Jacobins (still including the party later known as the Girondins or Girondists) and Cordeliers. Its most famous leaders were Jacques Pierre Brissot, the philosopher Condorcet and Pierre Victurnien Vergniaud. The Left drew its inspiration from the more radical tendency of the Enlightenment, regarded the émigré nobles as traitors and espoused anticlericalism. They were suspicious of Louis XVI, some of them favoring a general European war, both to spread the new ideals of liberty and equality and to put the king's loyalty to the test.

The remainder of the House, 345 deputies, generally belonged to no definite party. They were called The Marsh (Le Marais) or The Plain (La Plaine). They were committed to the ideals of the Revolution, hence generally inclined to side with the Left, but would also occasionally back proposals from the Right.

The king's ministers, named by him and excluded from the Assembly, are described by the 1911 Encyclopædia Britannica as "mostly persons of little mark".

== Formation ==
The 27 August 1791 Declaration of Pillnitz already threatened France with an attack by its neighbors. King Louis XVI favored war hoping to exploit a military defeat to restore his absolute power—the Assembly was leaning toward war and to spread the ideals of the Revolution. This led in April 1792 to the first of the French Revolutionary Wars.

The king vetoed many of the Assembly's bills throughout its existence such as these:

- Legislation declaring the émigrés guilty of conspiracy and prosecuted as such was passed on 8 November 1791, but vetoed by Louis.
- Enforcement of the Civil Constitution of the Clergy: on 29 November 1791, the Assembly decreed that every nonjuring clergyman who did not take the civic oath within eight days would lose his pension and—if any troubles broke out—he would be deported. Louis vetoed the decree as a matter of conscience.

Louis XVI formed a series of cabinets, veering at times as far left as the Girondins. However, by the summer of 1792, amid war and insurrection, it had become clear that the monarchy and the now-dominant Jacobins could not reach any accommodation. On 11 July 1792, the Assembly formally declared the nation in danger because of the dire military situation.

On 9 August 1792, a new revolutionary Commune took possession of Hôtel de Ville and early on the morning of 10 August the insurgents assailed the Tuileries, where the royal family resided. Louis and his family sought asylum with the Legislative Assembly.

The Assembly stripped Louis, suspected of intelligence with the enemy, of all his royal functions and prerogatives. The king and his family were subsequently imprisoned in the Temple. On 10 August 1792, a resolution was adopted to summon a new National Convention, to be elected by universal suffrage.

Many who had sat in the National Constituent Assembly and many more who had sat in the Legislative Assembly were re-elected. The Convention met on 20 September 1792 and became the new government of France.

== Reforms ==
There were numerous reforms passed by the Legislative Assembly that addressed various topics including divorce, émigrés, and the clergy.

The Legislative Assembly implemented new reforms to help create a society of independent individuals with equal rights. These reforms included new legislation about divorce, government control over registration, and inheritance rights for children. The registration of births, marriages, and deaths became a function under the government instead of the Catholic Church. The new laws introduced adoption and gave illegitimate children inheritance rights equal to those of legitimate children. Before 1791, divorces could only be granted for adultery and other violations of the marriage contract, but under the new reform a couple could also get divorced if they met one or more of the following:

- If there was mutual consent of both spouses
- If there was a unilateral incompatibility of character
- If the couple had been formally separated before and needed a legalized divorce
- If there was dissolution of marriage due to "insanity, condemnation to an infamous punishment, violence or ill-treatment, notoriously dissolute morals, desertion for at least two years, absence without news for at least five years, and emigration"

The new divorce laws were not sexually discriminatory as both the man and woman had the right to file for a divorce—the women petitioned for the most divorce decrees.

The émigrés, mainly members of the nobility and public office who fled France after the events of the Revolution turned violent, were a major focus of the Legislative Assembly. In their decree on 9 November 1791, the Legislative Assembly established a three-class hierarchy of émigrés as well as the punishments that would correspond with each class. The first class was composed of the princes and other people of high birth who "formed [emigration’s] rallying point and controlled both its recruiting in France and its organization abroad".

The second class was composed of officials in public office, soldiers and other members of society with less organizational clout than members of the nobility yet more influence than the common people. The third and final class of recognized émigrés encompassed the average French citizens who left France yet commanded little to no direct influence over emigration proceedings.

In twelve articles, the decree outlined the economic and political punishments of the first and second classes—particularly assigning deadlines by which time emigration would be classified as an act of treason. Article 3 dictated that first class émigrés still abroad after 1 January would be "impeached for treason and punished with death" and articles 6 through 10 imposed a loss of position, salary, and even citizenship for second class émigrés still abroad after 14 September. Along with the declaration that emigration could result in the loss of active citizenship, article 6 established the Assembly's right to sequester first class émigrés' revenues and article 11 classified émigré soldiers as deserters.

As the Legislative Assembly considered third class émigrés to be faultless victims of trickery and seduction by the other two classes, the legislators' decree explicitly avoided issuing punitive measures against third class émigrés—whereas the other classes were to be financially and socially punished, third class émigrés were to be treated with "sympathy and understanding". The émigrés decree was vetoed by the king three days later.

The laws regarding the clergy were mostly made in response to a reform passed by the National Assembly in July 1790, known as the Civil Constitution of the Clergy. In this decree, the National Assembly took the power to appoint bishops and curés away from the king. Many members of the Catholic clergy objected to this ruling. In response, the National Assembly required a public oath of fidelity from the clergy if they wanted to retain their positions in the Catholic Church.

This decision was not well received by a substantial portion of the clergy, which is why the Legislative Assembly felt it was necessary to address the issue. Those unwilling to take the oath were known as non-juring members. On 29 November 1791, the Legislative Assembly decreed that any who refused to take the oath were committing a political crime and were liable to punishments including loss of pension and expulsion from their homes in the event of religious disturbances.

== Political groups ==
The Legislative Assembly was driven by two opposing groups. The members of the first group were conservative members of the bourgeoisie (wealthy middle class in the Third Estate) that favored a constitutional monarchy, represented by the Feuillants, who felt that the revolution had already achieved its goal. The other group was the democratic faction, for whom the king could no longer be trusted, represented by the new members of the Jacobin Club that claimed that more revolutionary measures were necessary. (Note: Immediately there was a great deal of dissension between the Feuillants and the democratic faction from changes made to the Constitution and the Flight to Varennes. The democrats felt that the influence of the majority of the populace was minimised because of census suffrage.)

== Presidents ==
Political parties

Independent
Feuillants Club
Jacobin Club

N°	Portrait	Name (Birth–death)	Term of office		Political party	Department	Legislature (election)
1		Claude-Emmanuel de Pastoret (1755–1840)	3 October 1791	30 October 1791	Feuillants Club	Seine	I (1791)
2		Pierre Victurnien Vergniaud (1753–1793)	30 October 1791	15 November 1791	Jacobin Club	Gironde	I (1791)
3		Vincent-Marie Viénot (1756–1845)	15 November 1791	28 November 1791	Feuillants Club	Seine-et-Marne	I (1791)
4		Bernard Germain de Lacépède (1756–1825)	28 November 1791	10 December 1791	Feuillants Club	Seine	I (1791)
5		Pierre-Édouard Lémontey (1762–1826)	10 December 1791	26 December 1791	Feuillants Club	Rhône	I (1791)
6		François de Neufchâteau (1750–1828)	26 December 1791	22 January 1792	Jacobin Club	Vosges	I (1791)
7		Marguerite-Élie Guadet (1758–1794)	22 January 1792	7 February 1792	Jacobin Club	Gironde	I (1791)
8		Nicolas de Condorcet (1743–1794)	7 February 1792	19 February 1792	Jacobin Club	Seine	I (1791)
9		Guillaume-Mathieu Dumas (1753–1837)	19 February 1792	4 March 1792	Feuillants Club	Seine-et-Oise	I (1791)
10		Louis-Bernard Guyton de Morveau (1737–1816)	4 March 1792	19 March 1792	Jacobin Club	Côte-d'Or	I (1791)
11		Armand Gensonné (1758–1793)	19 March 1792	15 April 1792	Jacobin Club	Gironde	I (1791)
12		Félix-Julien-Jean Bigot de Préameneu (1747–1825)	15 April 1792	29 April 1792	Feuillants Club	Ille-et-Vilaine	I (1791)
13		Jean-Gérard Lacuée (1752–1841)	29 April 1792	13 May 1792	Feuillants Club	Lot-et-Garonne	I (1791)
14		Honoré Muraire (1750–1837)	13 May 1792	27 May 1792	Feuillants Club	Var	I (1791)
15		François-Alexandre Tardiveau (1761–1833)	27 May 1792	10 June 1792	Feuillants Club	Ille-et-Vilaine	I (1791)
16		François-Alexandre Tardiveau (1756–1836)	10 June 1792	24 June 1792	Independent	Loire-Atlantique	I (1791)
17		Louis Stanislas de Girardin (1762–1827)	24 June 1792	8 July 1792	Jacobin Club	Oise	I (1791)
18		Jean-Baptiste Annibal Aubert du Bayet (1759–1797)	8 July 1792	22 July 1792	Feuillants Club	Isère	I (1791)
19		André-Daniel Laffon de Ladebat (1746–1829)	22 July 1792	7 August 1792	Feuillants Club	Gironde	I (1791)
20		Jean-François Honoré Merlet (1761–1830)	7 August 1792	20 August 1792	Jacobin Club	Maine-et-Loire	I (1791)
21		Jean-François Delacroix (1753–1794)	20 August 1792	2 September 1792	Jacobin Club	Eure-et-Loir	I (1791)
22		Marie-Jean Hérault de Séchelles (1759–1794)	2 September 1792	16 September 1792	Jacobin Club	Seine	I (1791)
23		Pierre-Joseph Cambon (1756–1820)	16 September 1792	16 September 1792	Jacobin Club	Hérault	I (1791)

== Journal of Debates ==
- Journal des débats et des décrets. Vol. XXII. Imprimerie nationale. (October 1791)
- Journal des débats et des décrets. Vol. XXIII. Imprimerie nationale. (November 1791)
- Journal des débats et des décrets. Vol. XXIV. Imprimerie nationale. (December 1791)
- Journal des débats et des décrets. Vol. XXV. Imprimerie nationale. (January 1792)
- Journal des débats et des décrets. Vol. XXVI. Imprimerie nationale. (February 1792)
- Journal des débats et des décrets. Vol. XXVII. Imprimerie nationale. (March 1792)
- Journal des débats et des décrets. Vol. XXVIII. Imprimerie nationale. (April 1792)
- Journal des débats et des décrets. Vol. XXIX. Imprimerie nationale. (May 1792)
- Journal des débats et des décrets. Vol. XXX. Imprimerie nationale. (June 1792)
- Journal des débats et des décrets. Vol. XXXI. Imprimerie nationale. (July 1792)
- Journal des débats et des décrets. Vol. XXXII. Imprimerie nationale. (August 1792)
- Journal des débats et des décrets. Vol. XXXIII. Imprimerie nationale. (September 1792)
