= François-Alexandre Tardiveau =

French politician and lawyer

François-Alexandre Tardiveau (1761–1833) was a lawyer and French politician.

He was elected, on 31 August 1791, member of Ille-et-Vilaine in the Legislative Assembly. He served as a member of the Committee on Research, gave readings of several reports on the troubles of the Eure, on the actions of ministers, on the prosecution of crimes of hiring and on the assassinations of Lille.

Tardiveau became the president of the Assembly 27 May – 10 June 1792. He made a motion on the certificates of residence and offered to send commissioners to visit the borders and ensure their implementation in state of defense.

On 28 Germinal V (17 April 1797) he was elected as a member of the Loire-Inferieure to the Council of Five Hundred, by 256 votes (303 voters), and sat in the majority. He supported the coup of 18 Brumaire, and he became deputy mayor of Nantes on 17 Germinal VIII (7 April 1800), and Commissioner of the Court of Appeal of Rennes on 12 Floreal (2 May 1800).
