= Jean-François Honoré, baron Merlet =

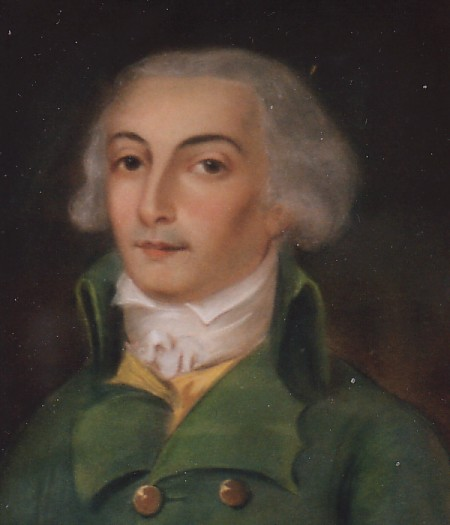
Jean-François Honoré

Jean-François Honoré, baron Merlet (26 September 1761 – 16 December 1830) was a French statesman of the French Revolution and French Empire. He was created baron of the Empire 9 September 1810.

== Biography ==
Born 15 September 1761, close to Doue, department of Maine-et-Loire, eldest son of Jean Merlet (1735–1793) and of Marie Madeleine Grignon de la Guiberdiere (1735–1794). Merlet settled as a lawyer in nearby Saumur and married Marie Magdeleine Clement (1764–1828) on 1 February 1785. They had three children that survived into adulthood.

== French Revolution ==
He adopted the principles of the Revolution and wrote the cahiers de doléances of the Third Estate of his riding. He wrote against acting in concert with the other two Estates because they lacked the legitimacy of the Third Estate.

Merlet was appointed to a series of positions as the National Assembly conducted a massive reorganisation of France's administrative structure. He was a major of the National Guard (July 1789), then named city councillor (of Saumur) and attorney-trustee of the district in the month of June 1790. He was the founder in Saumur of a Society of Friends of the Constitution, which soon after became affiliated to the network of clubs remembered in history as the Jacobins.

On 8 September 1791, the electoral college of his home department made him their third (of eleven allotted places) selection to be one of their deputies to the Legislative Assembly.

During the sessions of this assembly, he was part of several committees, most notably of Foreign Affairs, and of the Colonies, on which he defended the rights of people of colour, and promoted the cause of abolition of slavery. He became successively secretary, vice-president (26 July) and president (7 August 1792-20 August 1792) of this assembly at its most stormy times.

His election was likely due to his commitment to the constitution of 1791, but in the face of the growing revolutionary pressures, he helplessly witnessed the collapse of the first constitutional regime of France. When the French Monarchy finally fell (10 August 1792) he did not preside over the session (yielding the bench to Vergniaud), instead taking his place at the side of Louis XVI.

During the French Terror Merlet remained in hiding in Saumur and did not fulfill any public roles. After the coup of 9 Thermidor II (27 July 1794) he resumed his activities as a lawyer. He remained a private citizen throughout the régime of the Directory.

== Consulate and Empire ==
After the coup of 18 Brumaire (9 November 1799), an event to which he showed himself favorable, Merlet was appointed general counsel of Maine-et-Loire (1 June 1800).

His political career was resurrected when he was appointed to the prefecture of the Vendée (9 Frimaire IX, or 30 November 1800), a position he accepted despite the difficulties that a country still smoking from the fire of the civil war was to pose to his administration. He held this vital position for eight years.

His most important task in Vendée involved the construction of a new chef-lieu to replace the ruined Fontenay-le-Comte. The town of La Roche-sur-Yon was selected for a massive renovation and renamed Napoleanville by Merlet. The project was an abject failure, and provoked the wrath of Napoleon when he happened to visit in 1808.

After you have administered the Vendée for eight years, Merlet was moved to the prefecture of the department of Maine-et-Loire (12 February 1809), and that of the Roer (on 18 February following); but he refused, in protest of the intolerable military conscription. He was immediately appointed president of the commission of the magistrate of the Rhine in Strasbourg.

He organized the effort to improve the navigation of the Rhine, Basel to the mouth. Disappointed by this new workload, he resigned in 1812 and he waited in vain for a better post.

At the foundation of the Legion of Honor, he was appointed one of the commanders of the order. He is also appointed Master of Requests in extraordinary service to the Council of State at the time of its foundation (11 June 1806). He was named baron of the Empire 9 September 1810.

== Restoration and the Hundred Days ==
Counsellor of State to the Hundred Days, he chose, after the second Restoration of the throne of the Bourbons, a life in retirement, after having spent the greater part of his fortune in the service of his country. He died 16 December 1830 at the age of 69.
