= Edward Elwall =

Edward Elwall, born 9 November 1676, died 29 November 1744, was a mercer and grocer, born at Sedgley near Wolverhampton. He was a Unitarian and a Sabbatarian Baptist; that is, his day of rest and worship was the seventh day, the biblical Sabbath, rather than the first day of the week, the “papal pagan Sunday,” as he called it, which is kept by orthodox Christians. The people of Wolverhampton referred to him as ‘Jew Elwall,’ because of his Sabbath-keeping. He is said to have occasionally attended the Mill Yard Seventh Day Baptist Church in London.

In 1727 Elwall published his Unitarian beliefs in A true testimony for God and his sacred Law; being a plain, honest defence of the First Commandment of God, against all the Trinitarians under Heaven: ‘Thou shalt have no other gods but me.’

== Trial ==
The Anglican clergy charged him with blasphemy and heresy, for which he was brought to trial at the Stafford Summer Assizes 1726. The judge appears to have sought a means to acquit Elwall, because, at the start of the trial the judge, unusually, raised the legal technicality of whether or not Elwall had been provided with a copy of the indictment; he hadn’t. The judge asked Elwall if he wanted the case postponed until the next Assizes, but Elwall took the hint and declined. He was allowed to plead his case, after which the case was dismissed on the aforementioned technicality, without being referred to the jury.

Elwall’s trial and acquittal were frequently referred to by Unitarians throughout the eighteenth century, as an intimated legal precedent that might ward off their own arrest. Joseph Priestley, for example, published several editions of Elwall’s account of the trial, and added it as a supplement to his much published Appeal to the serious and candid professors of Christianity. Denying the Trinity was illegal. Priestley, along with anyone who avowed Unitarian beliefs remained liable to arrest and confiscation of property until the Toleration Act was extended to Unitarians by the Doctrine of the Trinity Act 1813.

== Views ==
Like many Dissenters, Elwall objected to the Tithe system that maintained the Church of England. In the seventeenth century, some Dissenters had advocated their Comprehension into the Church of England, and by implication their inclusion in the Tithe system. Others, like the Quakers simply refused to pay tithes, and went to prison for it. Elwall was one of the first to go as far as advocating Disestablishment. In 1738 he published a tract: The True and Sure Way to Remove Hirelings out of the Church. In this he wrote: “As Christ has declared that his kingdom is not of this world, so there never ought to be any worldly force to bring men into it, nor any forced maintenance to support it. All must be free and not forced. We read of Christ's whipping the buyers and sellers out but never in. All Christ's followers must be volunteers. He calls and they follow.”
