= Approbativeness =

Approbativeness is an excessive eagerness to become the subject of approval or praise.

One of the rare examples of the word's use, appears in a letter of 1829, from Helen Martineau, in which she comments on the figures in an embroidered fire-screen made by her youngest sister Isabella Higginson (1808-1860):

The Gypsey is my most especial admiration, and no less James’s too, who says he hopes [Isabella] has not the organ of approbativeness, or woe betide her where she is an object of such unbounded praise.

In phrenology, approbativeness is a term used to define the faculty or mental power associated with desires such as esteem, ambition, and superiority. Nowadays, approbativeness is often linked to the emotion of vanity, and, as such, is distinguished from self-esteem, which is linked to the emotion of pride. In psychology, approbativeness may be seen as an inordinate desire for applause and adulation, where the subject strives to be the centre of attention, with a consequent sensitivity to criticism and blame. For example,

Then think of the president’s skull, which is stuffed with other humours: insecurity, insincerity, victimhood, paranoia, mockery, self-delusion, suspicion, calculation, illogic, vindictiveness, risk, bullying, alimentiveness, approbativeness, vitativeness. Gall, divided into three parts.

Rev. Charles Josiah Adams (1850-1924), in his book Where Is My Dog? Or, Is Man Alone Immortal? (1892), one of the first serious speculations about animal afterlife from a Christian perspective, employs the phrase no less than seven times. He was much enamoured with phrenology.
