= Cirencester College =

Further education college in Cirencester, Gloucestershire, England

Coordinates: 51°42′45″N 1°59′10″W

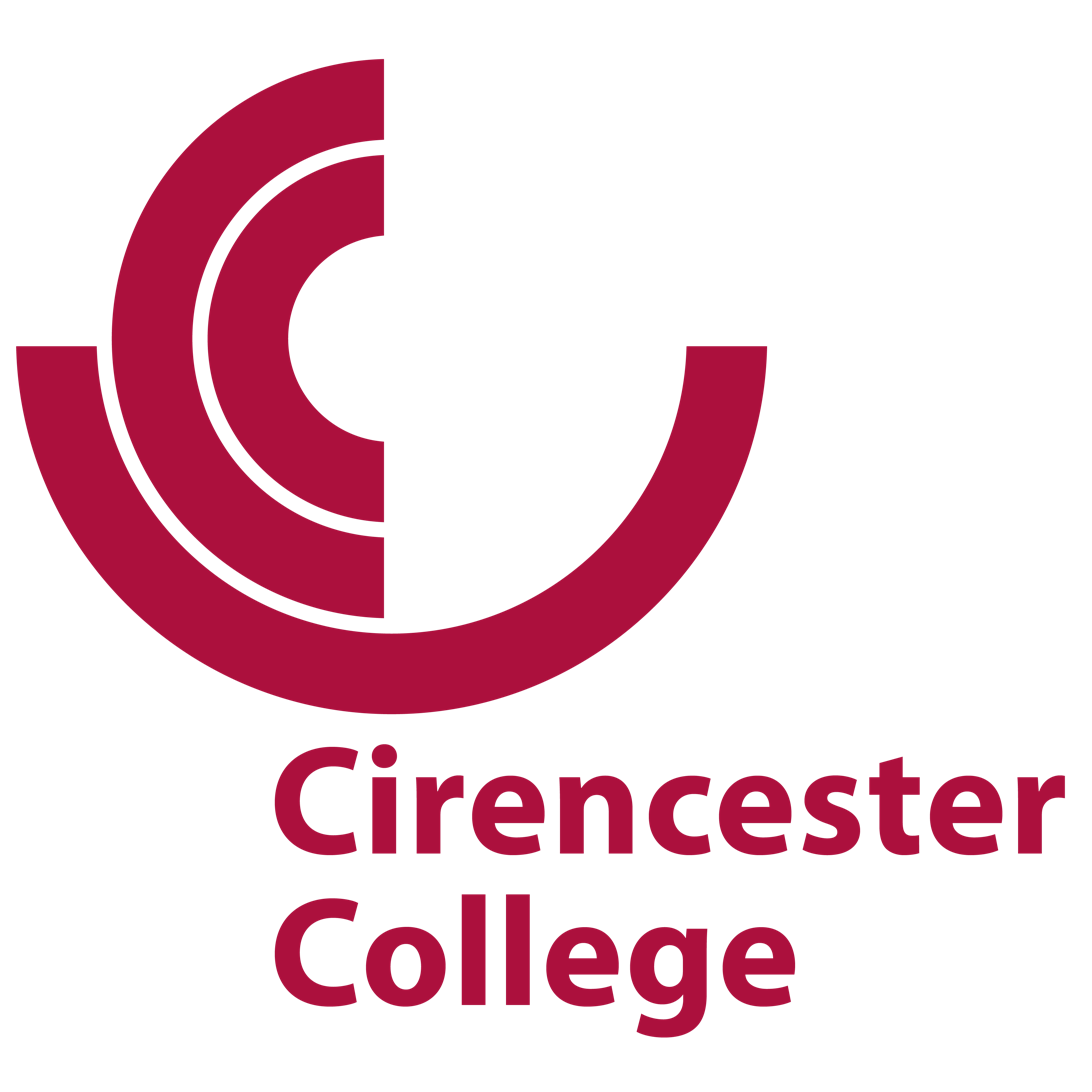
- Cirencester, Gloucestershire

Information
- Established: 1991
- Principal: Matt Reynolds
- Sixth form students: 3100 students (3000 full-time, 100 apprentices)
- Website: https://www.cirencester.ac.uk

Cirencester College is a sixth form college based in the town of Cirencester in the South Cotswolds. It is a specialist sixth form provider serving communities in Gloucestershire, South Gloucestershire, Wiltshire and Oxfordshire. Cirencester College offers a wide choice of qualifications including A-levels, the new T-levels in addition to vocational training.

== History ==
Established as a tertiary college, opening on 1 September 1991, Cirencester College gained its sixth form status in November 2011, one of only three designated colleges in the South West. The college achieved Beacon Status in 2004. In 2018, the college received "Good" status in an Ofsted report. In 2024, this status decreased to "Requires improvement".

=== Campus ===
The main campus is located half a mile from Cirencester town centre. The college undertook a building programme with a Sports Hall, multi classroom complex, STEM (science, technology, engineering and maths) building, and an Animal Centre which opened in September 2019. The Gloucestershire Digital Skills Centre opened in 2022 funded by GFirst, Gloucestershire’s Local Enterprise Partnership from the Government’s ‘Getting Building Fund’ programme. The college's new T-level building opened in February 2023; providing specialist accommodation for T-level students in engineering, health, construction, finance, early years, accounting and business.

The college is the site of the 275-seater Sundial Theatre, which is used for both college events and drama classes as well as external performances from bands, theatre companies, comedians, and professional speakers.

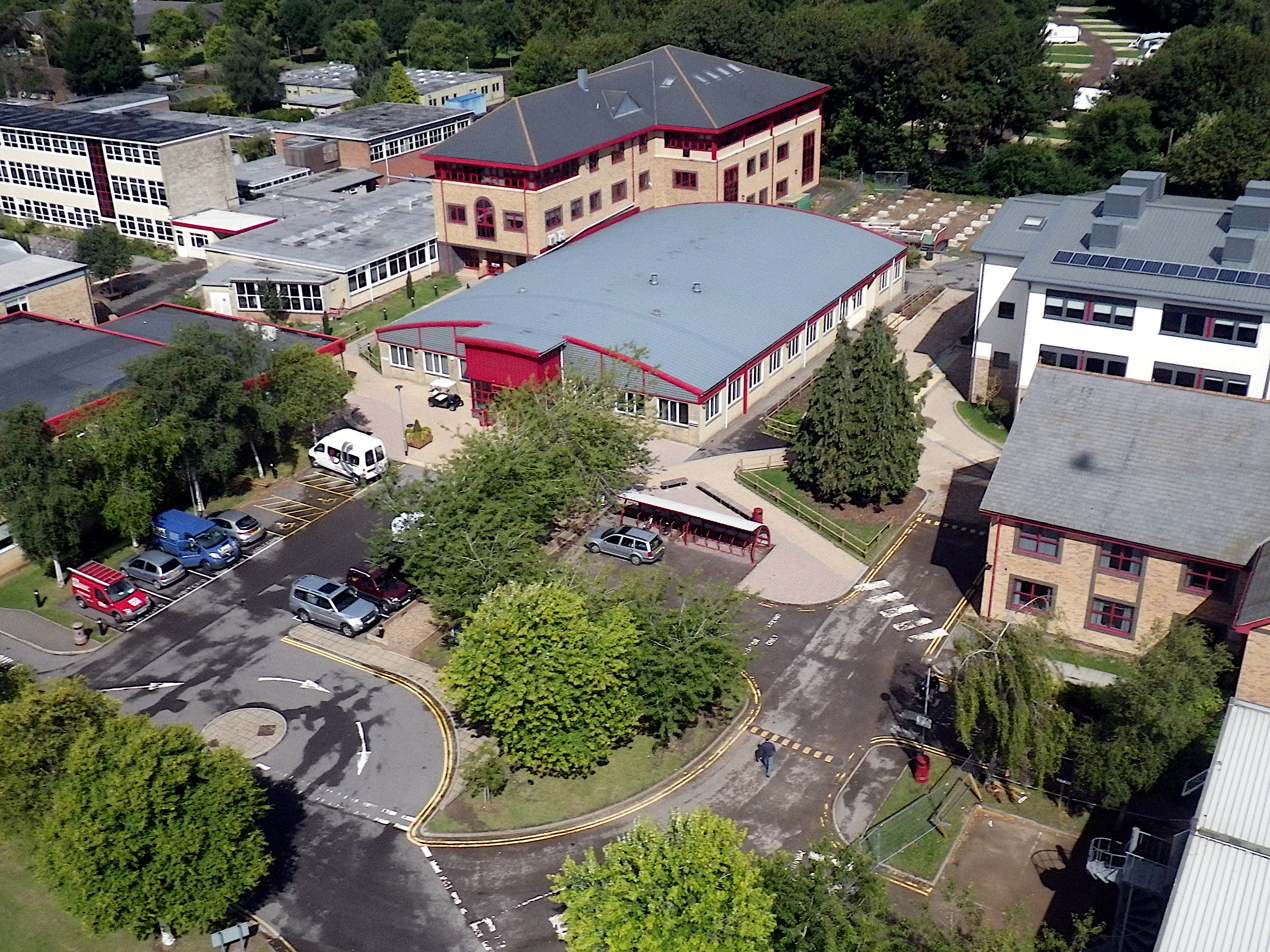
A kite aerial view of part of the campus.

=== Adult Education ===
The college has around 300 adult learners studying funded programmes such as English, maths and ESOL and another 600+ doing leisure courses for their interest and wellbeing.

== Former principals ==
- 1991–2010 Nigel Robbins, retired December 2010
- 2011–2017 Kim Clifford, retired January 2017
- 2017–2023 Jim Grant, lecturer of history and archaeology, advocate for T levels, and published archaeologist. He died on 15 May 2023
- 2023–present Matt Reynolds

== Notable alumni ==
- Ellie Harrison - Journalist, and presenter of the BBC's CountryFile.
- Pete Reed - Three-time Olympic gold medallist rower.
- Phoebe Paterson Pine - British paralympian and archer.
