= Principal (academia) =

Chief executive or chief academic officer

The principal is the chief executive and the chief academic officer of a university or college in certain parts of the Commonwealth.

In the United States, the principal is the head of school at most pre-university, non-boarding schools.

== Canada ==
Queen's University in Canada has a principal instead of a president or rector as a result of its Scottish origins. The constituent colleges of the University of Toronto have principals, who serve as the heads of the colleges, as do the university's Mississauga and Scarborough campuses due to their origins as constituent colleges. Bishop's University, and the Royal Military College of Canada also have principals.

McGill University was formerly headed by a principal, but the nomenclature was changed to president in 2023.

== England ==
Many colleges of further education in England have a principal in charge (e.g., Cirencester College and West Nottinghamshire College).

At collegiate universities, the title of principal is used for the head of college at many colleges. These include:

- The heads of Homerton College and Newnham College at Cambridge University.
- The heads of almost all of the colleges at Durham University (the exception being Hatfield College).
- The heads of all colleges at Lancaster University.
- The heads of Royal Holloway (vice-chancellor and principal), Queen Mary (president and principal), the Royal Veterinary College (president and principal), the Royal Academy of Music and the Royal Central School of Speech and Drama at the University of London.
- The heads of Brasenose, Green Templeton, Harris Manchester, Hertford, Jesus, Lady Margaret Hall, Linacre, Mansfield, St Anne's, St Edmund Hall, St Hilda's, St Hugh's and Somerville at Oxford University.

== South Africa ==
In South Africa, the Higher Education Act 101 of 1997 defines the principal as "the chief executive and accounting officer of a public higher education institution." The definition allows for the alternative nomenclatures of vice-chancellor and a rector, and these terms are in widespread use (the term vice-chancellor is more common in English-medium universities, whilst the term rector tends to be used in Afrikaans-medium universities). The exact name in a particular university will be defined by the Institutional Statute. The same act defines the chancellor as the titular head of an institution.

== Scotland ==
In Scotland the principal is appointed by the University Court or governing body of the university and will be chairman or president of the body of academics. In the case of the ancient universities of Scotland the principal is president of the Academic Senate. The principal also holds the title of vice-chancellor, but their powers with regard to this position extend only to the awarding of degrees, as both the vice-chancellor and chancellor are titular posts.

== United States ==
In 1999, there were about 133,000 principals and assistant principals in the United States. In the early decades of public education, the full title was "principal teacher", which accounts for the present-day title having an adjectival form, essentially being a shortened version of the original full title. Yet the terms head(master/mistress) and head of school are still used in older schools, such as in Louisiana and some southern small towns. School principals in the United States are sometimes required to have school administrator licensing, and often, a master's degree in educational administration.
