= Beth Breeze =

British academic

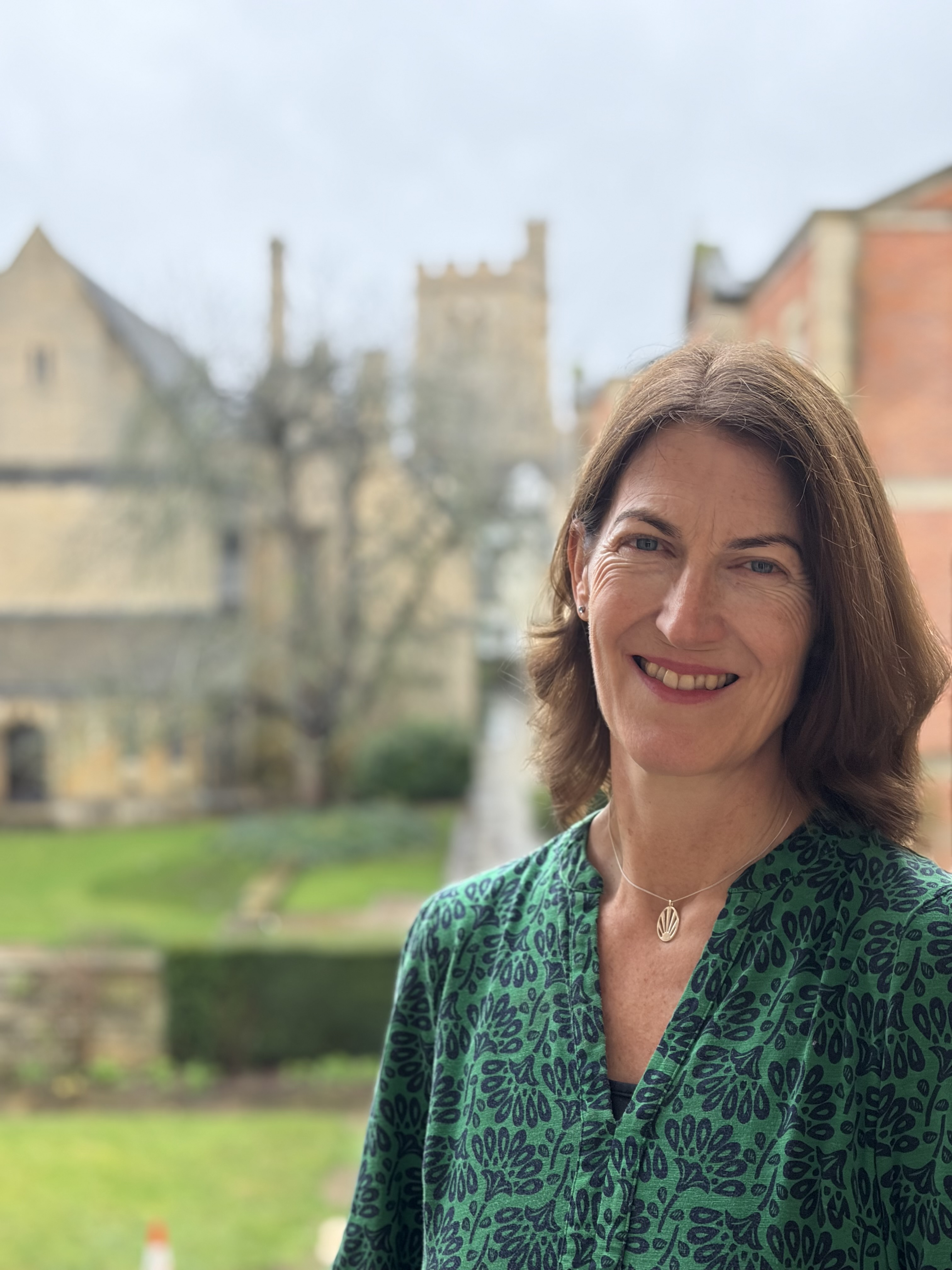
Beth Breeze at Harris Manchester College in 2026

Elizabeth Ann Breeze OBE (born 3 October, 1971) is a British academic in the field of philanthropic studies. and the current Principal of Harris Manchester College, Oxford. She was formerly the director of the Centre for Philanthropy at the University of Kent

== Early life and education ==
Breeze attended the United World College of the Atlantic, Wales, where she studied for the International Baccalaureate before going on to study for a degree in social anthropology at the University of St Andrews, Scotland. In 2001, whilst working as a fundraiser and charity manager, she completed a Master of Science degree at the London School of Economics and Political Science (LSE) in Voluntary Sector Organisation, Charity and Philanthropy. Her master's degree thesis, which explored the relationship between income and charitable giving, was published as an LSE working paper. In 2005 she embarked on a PhD degree at the University of Kent on the topic of the social meaning of philanthropy in contemporary UK society, which was awarded in 2011.

== Career ==
Breeze began her career working in fundraising and as a charity manager, starting in 1997 at the Cardinal Hume Centre for young homeless people, where she later became a trustee. In 2004, she was selected as the Labour Party candidate for the Maidstone and The Weald constituency. She then worked in three think tanks: the Fabian Society, Demos and the Social Market Foundation before becoming Deputy Director of the Institute for Philanthropy in 2004.

After completing her doctorate, she went on to research and teach philanthropy and fundraising at the University of Kent, where she also co-founded the Centre for Philanthropy.

The importance of both fundraisers and philanthropists in generating income for good causes is a theme throughout her work, including her first monograph The New Fundraisers: Who Organises Charitable Giving in Contemporary Society?, funded by a Leverhulme Trust Early Career Fellowship.

Breeze was made an Officer of the Order of the British Empire (OBE) for "services to philanthropic research and fundraising" in the 2022 New Year Honours and in the following year she was appointed the UK's first Professor of Philanthropic Studies at the University of Kent.

In March 2025, Breeze was announced as the incoming Principal of Harris Manchester College, the only University of Oxford college dedicated solely to mature students. She took up the role on 1 October 2025.

== Publications ==
- Richer Lives: Why Rich People Give (2013, co-authored with Theresa Lloyd)
- The Logic of Charity: Great Expectations in Hard Times (2015, co-authored with John Mohan) The Philanthropy Reader (2016, co-edited with Michael Moody)
- The New Fundraisers: Who Organises Charitable Giving in Contemporary Society (2017)
- In Defence of Philanthropy (2021)
- Advising Philanthropists: Principles and Practice (2023, co-authored with Emma Beeston)
- The Fundraising Reader (2023, co-edited with Donna Day Lafferty and Pamala Wiepking)
- Rich Expectations: Why Rich People Give (2025, 3rd decennial update of the Why Rich People Give study)
