= Local transport body =

Transportation authorities in England

A local transport body is a partnership of local authorities in England outside Greater London. There are 38 local transport bodies. They cover similar areas to local enterprise partnerships, but are not permitted to overlap each other. Decision making for major transport infrastructure spending is devolved to these bodies from the Department for Transport. They will receive funding from April 2015.

== Membership ==
Membership of local transport bodies include non-metropolitan local transport authorities (county councils and unitary authorities) or combined authorities and integrated transport authorities which cover metropolitan areas. Local enterprise partnerships are also members of local transport bodies.

== List of local transport bodies ==
=== North West England ===
- Cumbria Local Transport Body (CCA)
- Transport for Lancashire (LCCA)
- Liverpool City Region Local Transport Body (LCRCA)
- Greater Manchester Local Transport Body (GMCA)
- Cheshire and Warrington Local Transport Body (CWCA)

=== North East ===
- North East Local Transport Body (NEMSA)
- Tees Valley Local Transport Body (TVCA)

=== Yorkshire and the Humber ===
- North Yorkshire Local Transport Body

- North Yorkshire (district).

- West Yorkshire and York Local Transport Body

- West Yorkshire and York.

- Sheffield City Region Local Transport Body (SYMCA)

- South Yorkshire.

- Humber Local Transport Body

- East Riding of Yorkshire, Kingston upon Hull, North Lincolnshire and North East Lincolnshire.

=== West Midlands ===
- The Marches Local Transport Body

- Salop and Herefordshire.

- Stoke-on-Trent & Staffordshire Local Transport Body
- Black Country Strategic Transport Board

- Wolverhampton, Walsall, Dudley and Sandwell, in West Midlands.

- Greater Birmingham & Solihull Local Transport Board

- Birmingham and Solihull, in West Midlands.

- Coventry & Warwickshire Local Transport Body
- Worcestershire Local Transport Body

=== East Midlands ===
- D2N2 Local Transport Board (EMCCA)

- Derbyshire and Nottinghamshire.
- D2N2: Derby+Derbyshire+Nottingham+Nottinghamshire.

- Leicester and Leicestershire Transport Board
- Lincolnshire Strategic Transport Board

- Lincolnshire (non-metropolitan county).

- Northamptonshire Local Transport Body

=== South West England ===
- Gloucestershire Local Transport Board

- Gloucestershire (non-metropolitan county).

- Swindon and Wiltshire Local Transport Body
- West of England Local Transport Body

- Bristol, South Gloucestershire, Bath and North East Somerset and North Somerset.

- Dorset Local Transport Body
- Heart of the South West Local Transport Board

- Devon and Somerset, without North Somerset and Bath and North East Somerset.

- Cornwall and Isles of Scilly Local Transport Board

=== South East England ===
- Oxfordshire Local Transport Board
- Buckinghamshire Local Transport Body

- Buckinghamshire (district).

- Berkshire Local Transport Body
- Solent Local Transport Body

- Isle of Wight, and Southampton, Eastleigh, Fareham, Gosport, Portsmouth and Havant, in Hampshire.

- Enterprise M3 Local Transport Body

- New Forest, Test Valley, Winchester, East Hampshire, Basingstoke and Deane, Hart and Rushmoor, in Hampshire,
  and Waverley, Guildford, Woking, Surrey Heath, Runnymede, Spelthorne and Elmbridge, in Surrey.

- Coast to Capital Local Transport Body

- Mole Valley, Epsom and Ewell, Reigate and Banstead, and Tandridge, in Surrey, West Sussex, and Brighton and Hove, in East Sussex.

=== East of England ===
- Greater Cambridge and Greater Peterborough Local Transport Body

- Rutland and Cambridgeshire.

- Norfolk and Suffolk Local Transport Body
- South East Midlands Local Transport Board

- Bedfordshire and Milton Keynes, in Buckinghamshire.

- Hertfordshire Local Transport Body

=== South East England and East of England ===
- South East Local Transport Board

- East Sussex, Kent and Essex, without Brighton and Hove.

=== London ===
- None
