= Rick Campanelli =

Canadian television host

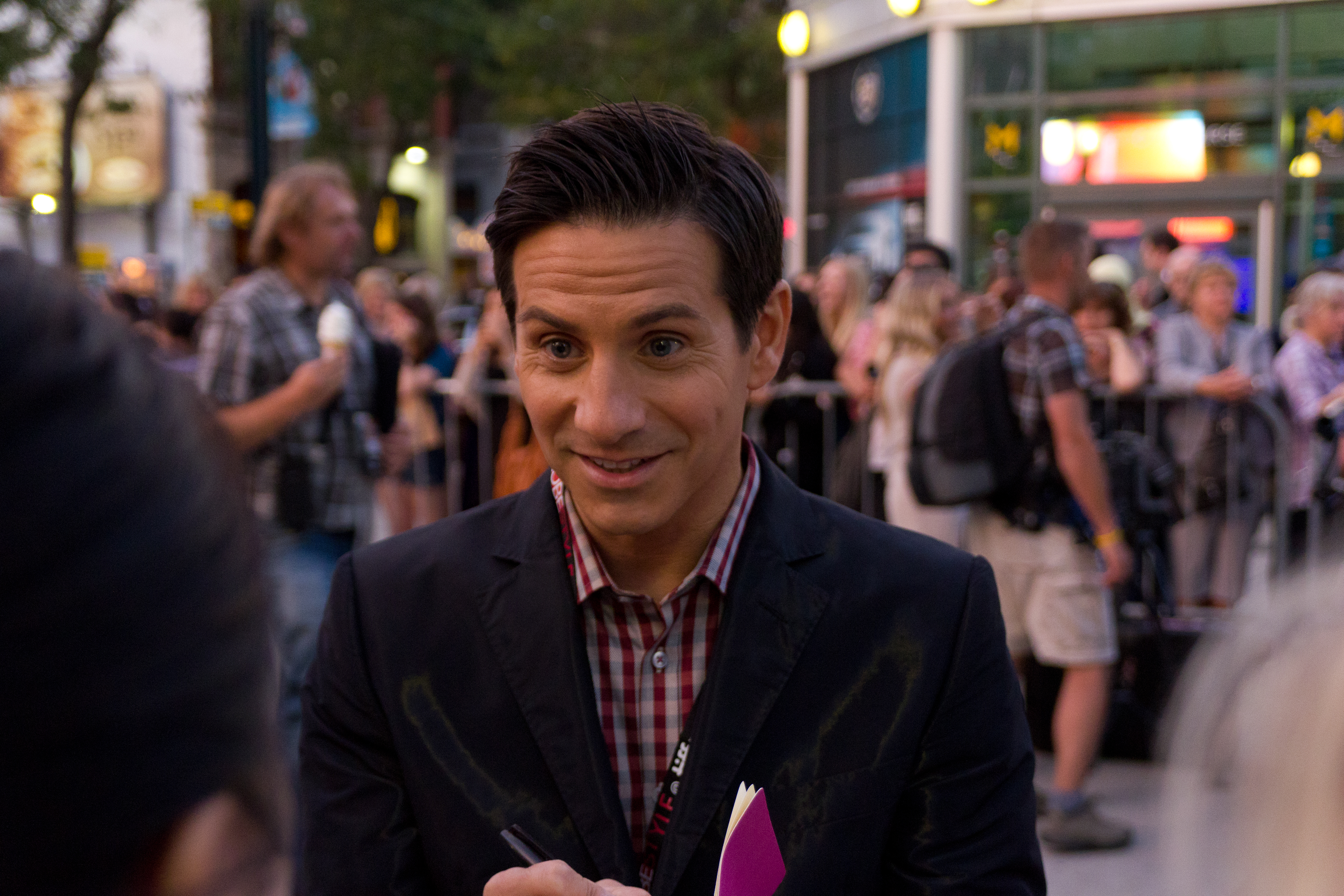
- Campanelli at the 2011 Toronto International Film Festival
- Born: Richard Adam Matthew Campanelli; January 5, 1970 (age 56); St. Catharines, Ontario, Canada
- Other names: Rick the Temp; The Franchise
- Education: Brock University
- Occupation: Media personality
- Known for: MuchMusic; ET Canada; The Traitors Canada
- Spouse(s): Kim Wannamaker (m. 2002; div. 2009) Angie Smith (m. 2013)
- Children: 3

Richard Adam Matthew Campanelli (born January 5, 1970) is a Canadian television and radio personality who currently works on Breakfast Television as a live eye reporter. He is known for his work as a VJ and host on MuchMusic and for co-hosting ET Canada.

== Life and career ==
Campanelli is a native of Hamilton, Ontario, and grew up in a working class Italian-Canadian family. He is the youngest of four siblings in a Roman Catholic family.

Campanelli attended school in St. Catharines. He attended Brock University, earning a degree in physical education.

Campanelli was introduced to the MuchMusic viewers as the winner of MuchMusic's 1994 MuchTemp contest. Originally he was nicknamed "The Temp" (or, famously, "Rick the Temp"). Campanelli has since been labeled "The Franchise" for his long tenure and high popularity while on MuchMusic. In addition to being a video jockey, he also co-hosted Much on Demand, The MuchMusic Countdown and The MuchMusic Radio Countdown.

Campanelli's final appearance on MuchMusic was August 26, 2005, on MuchOnDemand. He was subsequently announced as one of the reporters for ET Canada, a new Canadian licensee of Entertainment Tonight, which was launched on September 12, 2005.

In early 2007, Campanelli hosted the Canada's Case Game segments on Global's Deal or No Deal Canada, during that series' first limited run.

Campanelli is involved with several charitable organizations including World Vision Canada, Tuberous Sclerosis, Big Brothers/Big Sisters, McMaster Children's Hospital, and Kids Help Phone. On May 27, 2009, he hosted the Youth and Philanthropy Initiative in Toronto.

In February 2016, Toronto radio station CFNY-FM announced that Campanelli would join the station as co-host with Fred Kennedy and Melanie Mariani of the station's morning show, beginning June 27. Later that year, he made a cameo appearance in the music video for James Barker Band's "Just Sayin'".

In July 2017, it was announced that Campanelli would depart as co-host of ET Canada after 12 years when his contract ended in summer 2017. He appeared on ET Canada through August 2017.

In 2021, it was announced that Campanelli would join his former MuchMusic colleague Monika Deol to co-host 90's Nostalgia, a five-city Canadian concert tour featuring such artists as Aqua and Eiffel 65. Campanelli discussed this role during a visit to the Toronto Mike'd Podcast.

He joined Z103.5 in November 2021, and was co-host of the morning show until December 2022, when he left the station.

In 2023, Campanelli competed on the first season of The Traitors Canada, where he played as a Faithful. He was banished by his fellow castmates in the fifth episode.

In 2024, he joined CHFI-FM in Toronto as an afternoon host. In 2025, he joined Citytv's Breakfast Television as a live eye reporter, leaving the weekday shift on CHFI, but retaining a Sunday morning show on the station.

On September 1, 2026, Campanelli released a memoir titled Tempted where he opened up about struggling with a gambling addiction.
