= Leeds City Region =

- City region and Local enterprise partnership
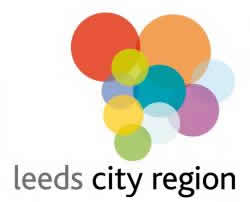
- Interactive map of Leeds City Region
- Coordinates: 53.800°N 1.549°W
- Sovereign state: United Kingdom
- Country: England
- Region: Yorkshire and the Humber
- Established: 2004 (Leeds City Region Concordat)
- Abolished: 2024
- Administrative HQ: Leeds
- Districts: List: Bradford; Calderdale; Kirklees; Leeds; Wakefield

Government
  - Type: Local enterprise partnership
  - Body: Leeds City Region Local Enterprise Partnership
  - Leadership: Chairman and board
  - Chairman: Roger Marsh

Area
  - Total: 2,200 sq mi (5,700 km^{2})

Population (2017)
  - Total: 2,320,214
  - Density: 1,100/sq mi (410/km^{2})
- Website: www.the-lep.com

The Leeds City Region, or informally Greater Leeds, was a local enterprise partnership city region located in West Yorkshire, England. Prior to the West Yorkshire devolution deal, the partnership covered parts of South and North Yorkshire. According to the Office for National Statistics, as of 2017 the city region ranked 2nd behind Greater London for both population and GVA in the United Kingdom.

A renewed focus on city regions in the UK led to Leeds City Region's foundation in 2004. It was the third major city region to be established in the United Kingdom, after Greater London in 1965 and Greater Manchester in 1974, encompassing numerous cities and towns throughout Yorkshire including Leeds, Bradford, Wakefield, Halifax and Huddersfield. From April 2007, strategic local governance decisions were made by the joint committee of Leeds City Region Partnership and Leeds City Region Leaders Board. A multi-area agreement was established in 2008 and from 2011 economic development was supported by the Leeds City Region LEP, a business-led local enterprise partnership.

As part of a 2012 'city deal', the West Yorkshire Combined Authority was established in order to receive devolved powers for transport, economic development and regeneration. The secretariat for the city region was based within Leeds City Council. The Leeds City Region Enterprise Zone promoted development in four sites along the A63 East Leeds Link Road.

Local enterprise partnerships were abolished in 2024, with their functions transferred to combined authorities and local authorities. The Leeds City Region's functions were succeeded by the West Yorkshire Combined Authority.

== Geography ==
The region covers a wide and varied physical area, taking in some of the Yorkshire Dales National Park.

Of the towns and cities, Leeds is the largest in geographical area, population and economy. However, Leeds contains less than a third of the region's population and geographical area.

Bradford is the second largest city in the region, together Leeds and Bradford contain more than 50% of the region's inhabitants.

Both Leeds and Bradford are among the top 5 largest local authority areas in England in terms of population.

=== Authorities ===
The region includes the whole of West Yorkshire. Historically, prior to 2021, parts of South Yorkshire and North Yorkshire were included within the partnership.

The geographical area included in the city region is made up of the local authority areas in West Yorkshire, comprising Bradford, Calderdale, Kirklees, Leeds and Wakefield.

Each head settlement of the boroughs belonged to the pre-1974 lieutenancy area named "West Riding of the County of York and the County of the City of York".

== Transport ==
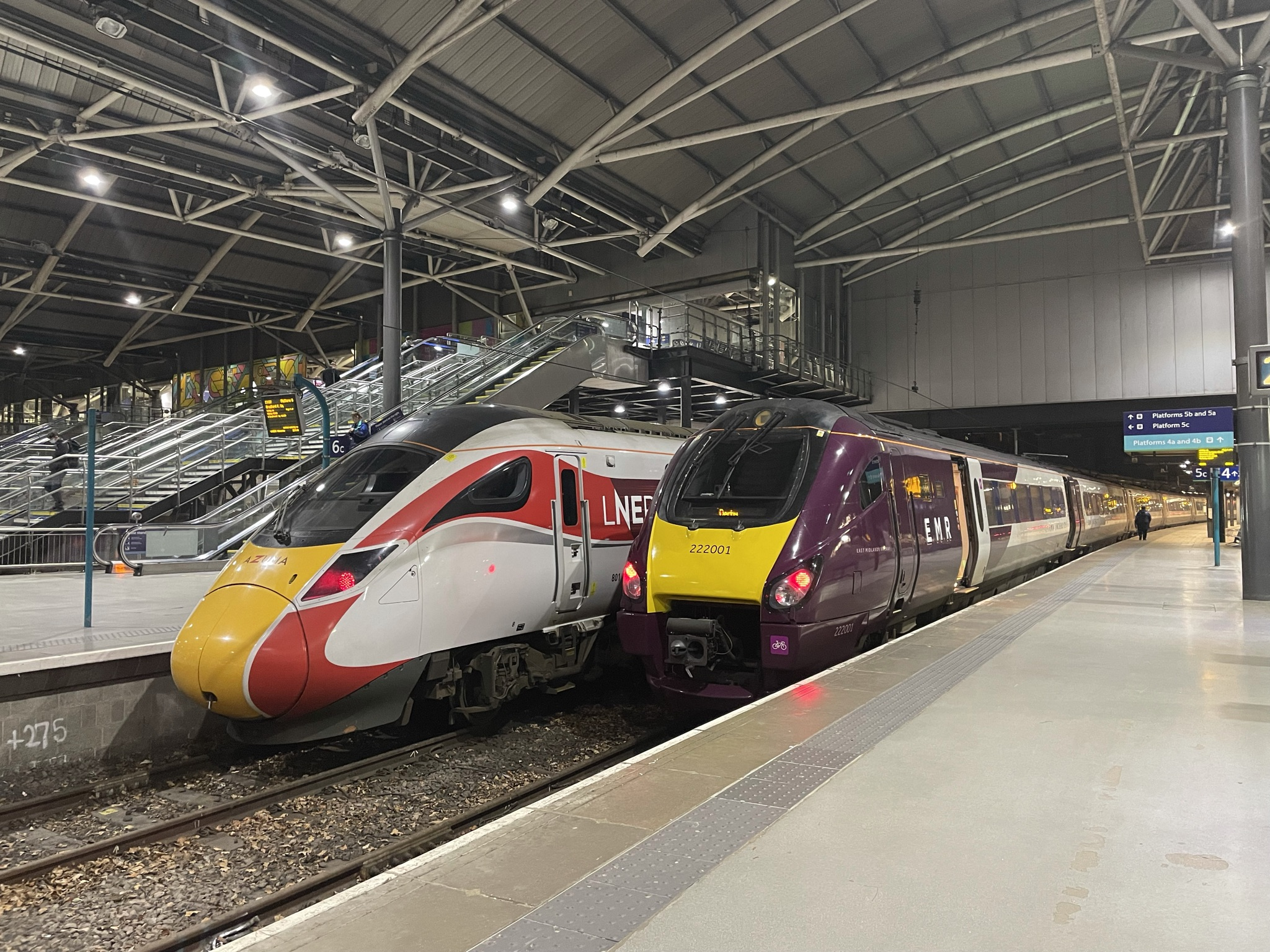
Leeds railway station

The city region is served directly by Leeds Bradford Airport, although Manchester Airport is easily accessed by train and road from parts of the City Region, while Doncaster, Teesside and Humberside airports are also easily accessible. The Humber ports are also within easy reach.

The north–south A1(M) and east–west M62 motorways intersect close to Leeds, near the terminus of the M1 from London. A series of motorway spurs enable traffic to reach the centres of Leeds and Bradford quickly. There is a comprehensive secondary road network based on Leeds, Bradford, Huddersfield and York. The A1, A64 and A650 are important trunk routes.

Leeds railway station is the hub of the region's extensive commuter rail network. The primary link to London is the East Coast Main Line, which principally serves Leeds, Wakefield Westgate and York. There are regional semi-fast services on the Trans-Pennine line that serve Huddersfield, Dewsbury, Leeds, Garforth, York and Northallerton. West Yorkshire Metro, coordinates rail services in the West Yorkshire part of this area, but not in Craven and Harrogate which are under the auspices of North Yorkshire County Council.The Leeds and Liverpool Canal and Aire and Calder Navigation run through the region, though today they are only used for leisure purposes.

Plans are in place to improve public transport in Leeds, making it a car free city with upgrades to railway, bus services, and cycle lanes.

== Economy ==
According to list of cities by GDP, Leeds City Region is in the top 150 city regions worldwide based on its GVA. The region has a diverse economy consisting of around 100,000 businesses, generating around £52 billion a year and is becoming recognised as a national centre for financial and business services. Leeds is at the economic heart, with some 124,000 people engaged in financial services. The city is the UK's second largest financial and legal centre.

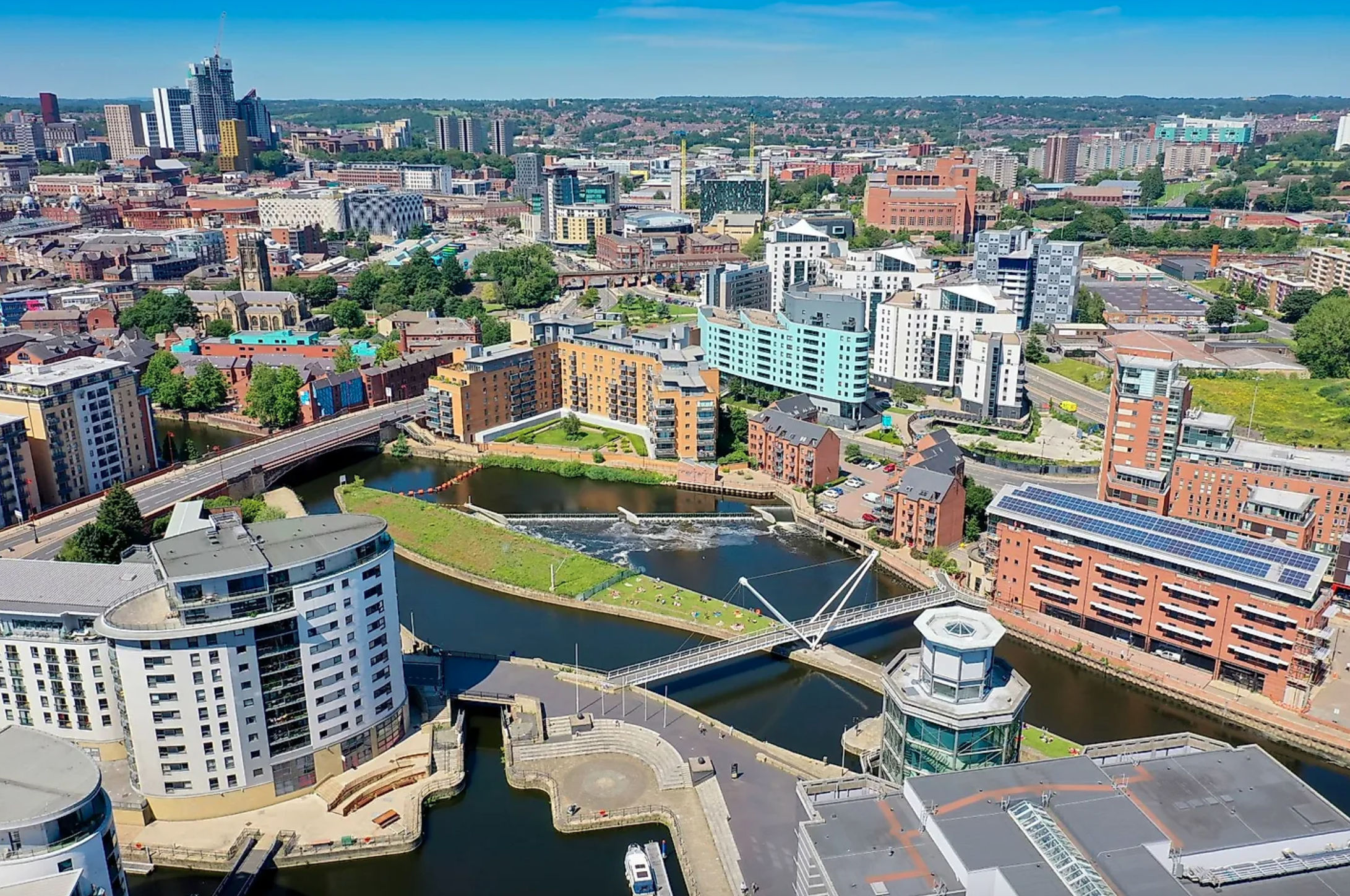
With an economy worth £64.6bn economy, Leeds is forecast to grow 21% over the next 10 years.

Rural areas have diversified with a mixed economy combining a range of employment opportunities alongside agriculture and a strong tourism base. Regardless of this, poor physical connectivity has hampered growth in rural areas. Agriculture has declined and there are pockets of severe deprivation and social exclusion. There are problems of housing affordability and poor access to services.

Although like most of the UK manufacturing has declined, the city region retains role in the UK's manufacturing base which has emerged from a period of restructuring and moved into producing higher value goods, managing off-shored elements of production and concentrating on research and development activity. The south and west of the region have historically had industrial based economies, although they have been moving away from this in recent decades. Huddersfield, for example, has been developing in the creative industries sector.

=== Economic drivers and innovation ===
City region growth sectors include

- Financial and business services
- Electronics and optical
- Communications
- Health and public services
- Creative arts

Niche clusters are

- Digital and media
- Bioscience and medical research
- Advanced niche manufacturing, including defence
- Logistics and distribution

Tourism

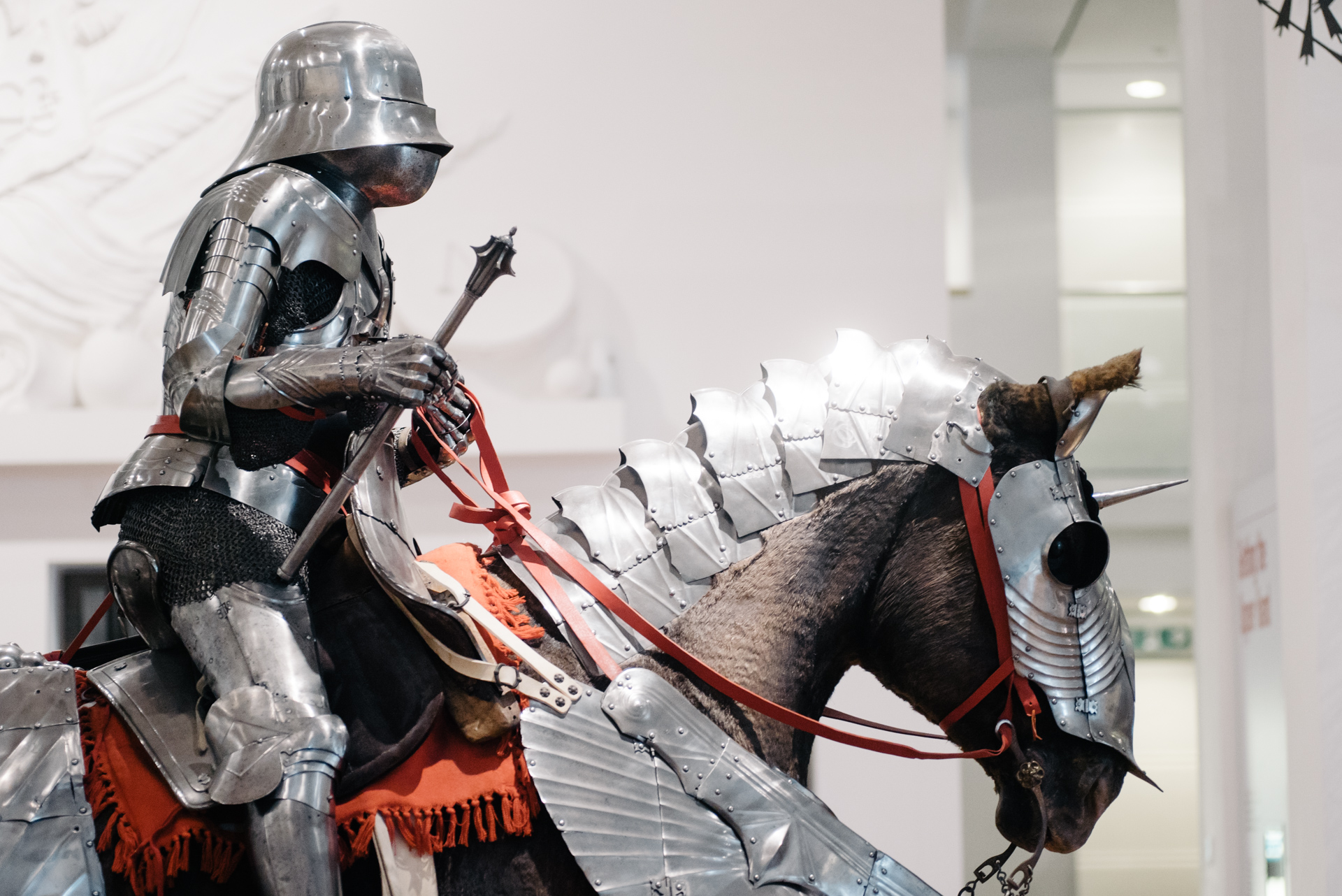
Leeds Royal Armouries

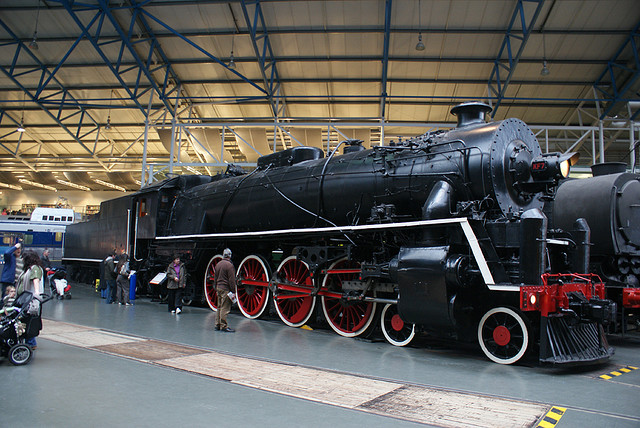
York Railway Museum

Yorkshire is a popular tourist destination with many tourists using Leeds, Skipton, Bradford, Harrogate and York as bases to explore the Yorkshire Dales National Park. In 2007 the visitor economy contributed £6.3 billion or 8.5% of the Yorkshire and the Humber region's total output – a high proportion compared to the national average.

This output has grown by 50% in the last 10 years. The sector employs 243,500 people, of which 51% work full-time, in over 20,000 businesses. Leeds displays a variety of natural and built landmarks. Natural landmarks include such diverse sites as the gritstone outcrop of Otley Chevin and the Fairburn Ings RSPB reserve. The city's parks at Roundhay and Temple Newsam have long been owned and maintained by the council for the benefit of ratepayers and among the open spaces in the centre of Leeds are Millennium Square, City Square, Park Square, and Victoria Gardens. This last is the site of the central city war memorial: there are 42 other war memorials in the suburbs, towns and villages in the district.

The built environment embraces edifices of civic pride like Morley Town Hall and the trio of buildings in Leeds, Leeds Town Hall, Corn Exchange, and Leeds City Museum, by the architect Cuthbert Brodrick. The two white buildings on the Leeds skyline are the Parkinson building of Leeds University and the Civic Hall, with golden owls adorning the tops of the latter's twin spires. Armley Mills, Tower Works, with its campanile-inspired towers, and the Egyptian-style Temple Works hark back to the city's industrial past, while the site and ruins of Kirkstall Abbey display the beauty and grandeur of Cistercian architecture. Notable churches are Leeds Minster (formerly Leeds Parish Church), St George's Church and Leeds Cathedral, in the city centre, and the Church of St John the Baptist, Adel and Bardsey Parish Church in quieter locations. Notable non-conformist chapels include the Salem Chapel, dating back to 1791 and notably the birthplace of Leeds United Football Club in 1919.

There are two World Heritage Sites; Fountains Abbey (Ripon) and Saltaire (Bradford). Four national museums are based in the region; the National Media Museum (Bradford), the Royal Armouries in Leeds, the National Railway Museum (the largest railway museum in the world) in York, and the National Coal Mining Museum for England (Overton). Plus many other smaller museums depicting the industrial, agricultural and cultural history of the region, such as the Armley Mills Industrial Museum in Leeds, the Bankfield Textile Museum in Halifax, the Brontë Parsonage Museum in Haworth and the Yorkshire Museum of Farming at Murton Park in York.

=== Skills and labour ===
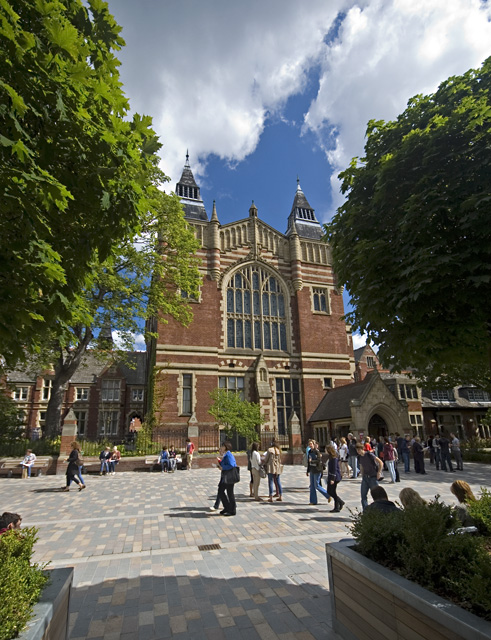
Leeds University

There is a large and diverse workforce of around 1.4 million and a younger than average profile in some parts of the city region, for example Bradford. The city region is home to six universities, University of Bradford, University of Huddersfield, University of Leeds, Leeds Beckett University, University of York and York St John University, which produce more than 40,000 graduates each year. The universities of Leeds and York, along with Sheffield, form the White Rose Consortium, which accounts for 86% of research spend in the region. Science City York represents a mechanism for creating an environment in which technology, skills and business can thrive together. The city region has been at the forefront of telecoms.There is a range of available employment space with a significant amount of new office space in Leeds.

=== Housing ===
There is variety of distinctive urban and rural communities. Many towns and villages are characterised by distinctive buildings based on an extensive Victorian legacy near to thriving job markets and commercial centres. Access to rural environments ranges from the 'high end' appeal of the Golden Triangle area of north Leeds, Harrogate and York districts to the towns and villages east and south of Leeds. Leeds is a centre for city centre living and has helped to stimulate similar developments in other urban centres including Bradford, Huddersfield and Wakefield.

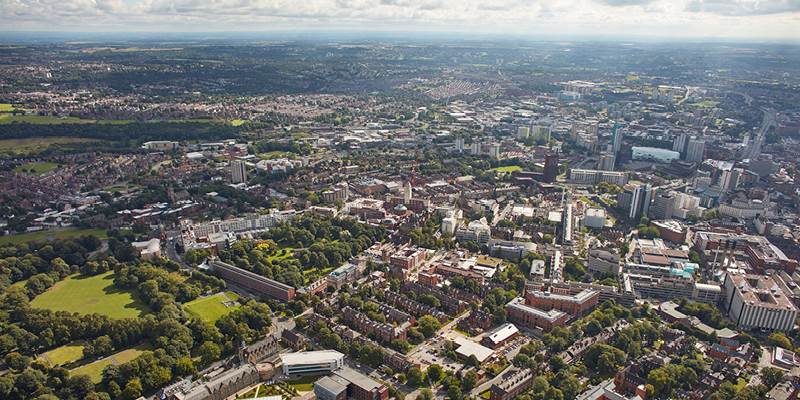
View of Leeds.

Current patterns of demand at the upper end of the market are likely to continue, increasing problems of division of social groups and affordability. At the other end of the market there are problems both with the shortage of social rented housing and affordability. There is a significant legacy of dense terraced housing some of which is no longer fit for purpose. The government has identified Leeds City Region to host a number of new eco-towns to meet housing demand.

== Political context ==
The invitation to the northern regional development agencies to devise a development plan to tackle the regional disparities coincided with the peak of New Labour's regional devolution agenda. It is underpinned by the government's target to "Make sustainable improvements to the economic performance of all English regions by 2008 and over the long term reduce the persistent gap in growth rates between the regions, demonstrating progress by 2006."

=== The Northern Way ===
In February 2004 the UK government invited the three regional development agencies in the North of England, Yorkshire Forward, One NorthEast and the Northwest Development Agency, to develop an economic growth strategy to raise the North's international profile and performance and reduce the £30 billion output gap between the Northern region and the average for the rest of England. In September 2004 the development agencies published "Moving Forward: The Northern Way (First Growth Strategy Report)".

The Growth Strategy shows how eight city regions are key to the growth of the northern economy. city regions are increasingly being recognised as powerful drivers for economic growth and between them the city regions of Leeds, Sheffield, Hull and the Humber Ports, Liverpool, Manchester, Central Lancashire, Tees Valley and Tyne and Wear have 90% of the North's population and over 90% of its economic activity. Manchester and Leeds were highlighted as the two city regions that have the most potential to develop into European level competitive cities.

A £100 million Northern Way Growth Fund was established by the Government and the regional development agencies to deliver a Business Plan, that had been devised in June 2005, aimed at implementing aspects of the Growth Strategy. As part of this plan the eight city regions identified in the strategy were invited to compile City Region Development Programmes to contribute to the plan. These set out the key actions and investments needed to implement the strategy in each city region.

=== Core cities ===
For more than ten years Leeds has been a member of the Core Cities Group, a coalition of England's major regional cities which work in partnership to enhance their economic performances, and to secure positive identities as places to live, work, visit and do business. It is a self-selected and self-funded group.

The Core Cities Group has eight main interests, namely:

- Transport and connectivity
- Innovation and business support
- Skills and employment
- Sustainable communities
- Culture and creative industries
- Climate change
- Finance and industry
- Governance

== Collaboration ==
The first economic summit, with the aim of discussing opportunities for greater collaboration within the Leeds city region, was in November 2004. Political leaders from Leeds, Barnsley, Bradford, Calderdale, Craven, Harrogate, Kirklees, Selby, Wakefield and York along with North Yorkshire, as well as representatives from other regional organisations took part. Delegates heard from speakers who presented the latest research on city regions as economic drivers. The need to engage in closer partnership and work at the city region level was recognised because it was emphasised that neither the city, or the larger region, is an appropriate spatial planning level at which to tackle issues of economic competitiveness.

Delegates to the conference concluded that greater collaborative working would be beneficial in the areas of transportation, innovation and science, skills and labour supply, business infrastructure and housing, quality of life, culture, marketing and image. Leaders and chief executives of the eleven authorities agreed that this was an agenda to be developed and also agreed to produce a concordat to progress closer working arrangements at a city region level.

== Development plans ==
The working arrangements negotiated at the economic summit held in November 2004 were used to develop an interim Leeds City Region Development Plan to be submitted as part of "The Northern Way" Business Plan in May 2005.

The second version of the development plan was published in November 2008. Within the context of wider submissions to the Comprehensive Spending Review 2007 made by the Northern Way Steering Group and Yorkshire Forward, the plan identified what the Leeds City Region is asking from government. It put forward a shortlist of evidenced strategic proposals and interventions that needed government support.

== Core Cities business plan ==
At the end of 2005, as part of the "New Deal for City Regions" initiative the Minister of Communities and Local Government asked each of the Core Cities to produce a business plan of a small number of key priorities that would help cities improve. A delegation from Leeds and the region presented the "Leeds Business Case" to the minister in summer 2006. The submission argued that the city would benefit from greater freedom to make decisions locally and should have a greater voice in how national and regional budgets are allocated. In particular, transport and skills development were presented as critical issues for the economy of the city.

== Sub national review ==
In the summer of 2007 the government published the "Review of Sub-national Economic Development and Regeneration". This sets out the governments strategy for reducing the gap in economic performance between Northern cities and their counterparts in the South, as well as the wealth gap within cities. The recognition by government that local and sub-regional authorities are in the strongest position to nurture and develop economic prosperity signalled the beginning of a new economic role for both the city and the Leeds City Region Partnership.

As part of the new arrangements regional assemblies were phased out from 2010 and the remit of the regional development agencies was expanded. In particular, the regional development agencies were given executive responsibility for developing a new Integrated Regional Strategy. The scrutiny powers of the Regional Assemblies will transfer to local authorities. The stated aim of the policies being to create economically strong cities and regions which drive forward national prosperity and provide opportunity and social justice for all.

== Partnership ==
The partnership has no direct political control of the cities and boroughs included in its area, but it does exert considerable influence over their local plans thanks to the Multi Area Agreement signed in July 2008. The partnership deals with issues that are important for the whole city region, yet which cannot be fully covered by one local government area alone, for example transport infrastructure and marketing the north of England to the world. The strategy provides the region with a single voice with which to address Central Government on key issues. In November 2006 the partnership published its revised development programme.

=== Constitution ===
Leaders Board

The Leeds City Region Leaders Board was legally constituted as a Joint Committee in April 2007. It brings together the elected leaders of the eleven partner authorities to take strategic decisions on behalf of the city region. The Leaders' Board is made up of the Leaders of each of the 10 district Authorities, as well as North Yorkshire County Council. It is governed by a set of annually agreed Procedures and Protocols, central to which is the principle of 'one member, one vote'. The Board meets 6 times a year and meetings are hosted in turn by each member Authority.

Leeds City Region Leaders' Board Panels are Working Groups set up by the Board to advise the Board on specific Leeds City Region matters. They comprise members of the Board or their representatives, and other such senior representatives of other organisations as may be co-opted onto the Panels by agreement of the Board. The Panels have no executive powers. The partnership has four panels which are involved in helping to develop strategies to improve:-

- Housing and Spatial Planning
- Skills
- Transport
- Economic Drivers and Innovation

Areas of work not specifically allocated to a single panel are:-

- Communications
- Sustainable Development

== Multi area agreement ==
In October 2007 the Leeds City Region Leaders Board decided to seek to develop a Multi Area Agreement which is a voluntary agreement between groups of local authorities and government which focuses on cross boundary working and devolution as a means of promoting an increase in local economic prosperity. The Leeds City region was in the first wave of pilot areas for a Multi Area Agreement and the partners used the opportunity to implement areas of the City Region Development Programme.

== Forerunner plan ==
In March 2009 Leeds City Region Partnership submitted a formal bid for more powers and funding from Government through a pilot programme on offer. The Partnership put forward a "Forerunner Plan" with proposals for greater responsibilities in housing and regeneration, higher level skills and innovation. The bid was the Partnership's formal response to the announcement by HM Treasury in the November 2008 Pre-Budget Report that Government would be working with at least two city region partnerships across the country to pilot new freedoms and flexibilities in a range of areas. These arrangements will see the Government and its agencies delegating greater control over funding and delivery of key schemes to the city region authorities as a way of stimulating economic growth. The Partnership has proposed that with the new powers and funding, the city region authorities will be able to more effectively deliver the short and long-term actions needed to get markets working again.

In April 2009 the partnership joined the Manchester City Region as one of the only two city regions in the country to be granted this pilot status as announced by the Chancellor Alistair Darling in his Budget speech. This will grant the partnership devolved spending powers in housing, regeneration, skills and innovation.

== Eco towns and new growth points ==
The Leeds City Region was invited by the government to submit proposals for new eco-towns. However, the City Region Partnership has considered the case for a free-standing eco town and concluded that it would not offer the most appropriate, sustainable way forward for meeting the city region's housing and affordable housing needs. After a study of the city region the Stockholm Environment Unit found the best way of reducing its carbon footprint by 80% by 2050 involved working within existing settlements and changing behaviour. The partnership considers that the city region's housing and regeneration needs can be better served by delivering eco principles on a number of major regeneration sites within existing urban environments.

The partnership has proposed to Government four major brownfield regeneration sites as alternatives to an eco town in the city region. The proposed sites are:

- Aire Valley Leeds. A 1000-hectare site to the south east of the city centre. Up to 15,000 new homes, 7,000 refurbishments and 27,000 jobs.
- Bradford-Shipley Canal Corridor. Area of 118-hectares along five-mile stretch. Up to 5,000 new homes, 1,500 refurbishments and 5,900 jobs.
- York Northwest. On brown-field to the north and west of the station. Will deliver 4,300 new homes on 75-hectares of land and 5,000 jobs.
- North Kirklees / South Dewsbury Up to 4,000 new homes, 2,000 refurbishments and 5,000 jobs spread over four sites, Thornhill Lees, Savile Town, Ravensthorpe and Scout Hill.

Building work is only ready to start on one site, the Aire Valley scheme to the south east of Leeds city centre. The 1,000-hectare site has the potential to provide up to 15,000 eco homes, retrofit 7,000 existing homes and create 27,000 new jobs. Phase one will concentrate on the Hunslet Riverside area next to the Royal Armouries museum, where 2,500 new homes can be built. New trolleybuses and cycle paths will make travel to and from the area environmentally sustainable and cars will be discouraged.

Housing Minister, and Wentworth MP, John Healey announced in July 2009 that Yorkshire will receive £83 million through the Homes and Communities Agency Kickstart programme, designed to fund housing schemes that had stalled in the recession, enough to build 2,088 homes.

The City Region made a successful bid for "New Growth Point" status in July 2008. The programme of New Growth Point developments supports delivery of 5,000 additional new homes above regional housing targets. It is focussed within the district of Barnsley Calderdale and Wakefield across a range of tenures and including a variety of affordable homes for rent and owner occupation. The programme proposes 34,515 new homes, 5,000 of which will be net additional over the period 2008 to 2016/17.

== Integrated infrastructure ==
As a step towards developing an evidence base to support the co-production of the Integrated Regional Strategy (IRS) promulgated by the "Sub National Review of Economic Development and Regeneration", the city region has commenced a study to investigate whether current infrastructure arrangements will support the economic aspirations of the city region. The study aims identify the types of infrastructure improvements that will be needed to support growth. It will look at critical infrastructure and green infrastructure. For critical infrastructure, planners need to be confident that new developments have access to water, energy, waste treatment and broadband technology as well as ensuring that this infrastructure will be adaptable to climate change.

Green infrastructure is a relatively new term describing networks of linked green spaces. Work at the city region level will identify opportunities for linking the green spaces between districts, which will have direct benefits for public accessibility, biodiversity and eco-systems that have a positive benefit in terms of climate change adaptation.

== Integrated Transport Authority ==
After the publication of the draft Local Transport Bill in May 2007 the Partnership commissioned a review of transport governance arrangements in the region. Leeds City Region has stated that it is an aspiration for the City Region to become an Integrated Transport Authority, but with opposition to this from North Yorkshire County Council and the City of York council, these proposals cannot go ahead at this stage.

=== Local transport plan ===
The West Yorkshire rail network

The partnership is overseeing the investment of £4.5 billion in transport projects in the region. The £4.5 billion is being sourced from a number of locations, notably the Department for Transport and the regional transport board at Yorkshire Forward. Some of the money has already been spent through projects such as the regional smartcard pilot Yorcard, whereas other projects like NGT (New Generation Transport) in Leeds has recently been approved for government funding in 2012.

Significant progress has been made, in conjunction with Metro, to extend the zonal WYPTE MetroCard system into North Yorkshire as far as Harrogate on the Harrogate Line (Zone 6) and Skipton on the Airedale Line (Zone 7). Future plans will extend MetroCard to Gargrave, Knaresborough, York and Selby. Zone 6 & 7 MetroCards do not currently cover bus travel.

== Enterprise zone ==
The Leeds City Region Enterprise Zone, sometimes referred to as Aire Valley Leeds Enterprise Zone, was launched in April 2012. It includes four sites along the A63 East Leeds Link Road: Logic Leeds, Newmarket Lane, Thornes Farm, and the largest site, Temple Green. The total area is 142 hectares (350 acres).
