= Inter-Service Topographical Department =

The Inter-Service Topographical Department (1940–1946) was a joint British Army and Navy organization created during World War II that was responsible for supplying topographical intelligence for all combined operations, and in particular, for preparing reports in advance of military operations overseas. This was an intelligence unit administered by the Royal Navy.

== Origin ==
The Inter-Service Topographical Department (ISTD) came out of the near-fiasco of the British invasion of Norway (9 April – 9 May 1940). Prior to that time, the Army and Royal Navy had different intelligence units that were independent of each other. The ISTD was established at Manchester College, Oxford. Working together with members of each arm and the Allies, this unit was able to bring together zero-elevation aerial photography, which is photography taken as close to the wave tops as possible, in order to bring the views of the beach landscape, which were then made into continuous horizontal strip photographs. These files were marked with military targets such as bridges, marshalling yards and the like, and up-to-date photos and intelligence were used to up date obsolete maps. From these new maps, and from older maps, magazine illustrations, and old family photographs taken on holiday collected from the public, new maps could be produced for the planning staffs and operations forces.

== Departmental actions and publications ==
"Inadequate topographic intelligence could result in troops encountering impenetrable terrain, amphibious assaults landing on impassable beaches, or airborne assaults dropping into water. The U.S. Army's plan to provide photographic mapping support to advancing troops illustrates topographical intelligence's importance to the Western Allies. Further, the British developed the Inter-Service Topographic Department (ISTD) in October 1940. The ISTD responded to the British topographical intelligence shortage before the April 1940 German invasion of Norway. In fact, the paucity of topographical intelligence on Norway resulted in Royal Air Force Bomber Command pilots relying on 1912 revised Baedeker's guides—commonly used by foreign travelers— for navigation when attacking airfields in Norway. This lack of intelligence also caused Royal Navy carrier pilots to rely on contourless Admiralty charts during their attack on Narvik's port. Later, the topographical intelligence produced by the ISTD proved invaluable to the Royal Navy midget submarine attack and the Royal Navy torpedo aircraft attack during September 1942 and late 1944, respectively, on the German battleship Tirpitz based in Norway. It was also invaluable during the November 1942 Allied North African landings, and the St. Nazaire commando raid in March 1942. In tribute to the ISTD's effectiveness, the department received compliments from General Dwight D. Eisenhower for its support to the allied landings in French North Africa."

"Although direct foreign procurement could not be undertaken at this time, substantial amounts of material were received from the British Inter-Services Topographic Department and the Royal Naval Intelligence Division 5, respectively the publishers of the ISIS reports and the Geographic Handbooks. Colonel C. Bassett, R.M., and Admiral John Henry Godfrey, directors respectively of the ISTD and Naval Intelligence, RN, assisted in establishing map exchanges between the Allied planning staffs; subsequently a working alliance was maintained through the London Map Division of the OSS."

== Museum and library cooperation ==
As the war progressed, the Museum and Library staffs participated more and more in the activities of the Inter-Services Topographical Department (ISTD), a special department responsible for supplying topographical intelligence for all combined operations, and, in particular, for preparing reports in advance of military operations overseas. It relied in large measure upon the Museum and Library organization for the provisions of the geological information incorporated into the reports, such information being written up by the Museum staff or by the staff of the I.S.T.D. from bibliographies, maps and texts supplied to its Library Liaison Service from the Museum. The work was of a highly confidential character but, in special circumstances, of great importance and interest, and it is now permissible to state that the Museum and Library staffs provided information relating to every considerable military operation in Africa and Europe from the first landings in North Africa. Of special significance, not always apparent at the time that they were supplied, are the reports of North Africa and other Mediterranean territories in 1942; on Yugoslavia, Crete, the Dodecanese, and Möhne Valley, Lampedusa, Pantelleria, the geology of certain Alpine tunnels, and various regions of the Far East in 1943; and those on the flying bomb sites in France in 1944. In connexion with this class of work and in the course of a visit to the United States in 1944 by a member of the Museum staff, the opportunity was taken to establish contact with the Military Geology Unit of the US Geological Survey, with most helpful results. Considerable assistance was also given to the Naval Intelligence Division, whose handbooks are extensively used by the Services, by Government Departments, and by British embassies abroad. Chapters were contributed on the Mineral economics of West Africa, the Belgian Congo, Mozambique and Angola, and accounts of the geology and mineral resources of other territories prepared the staff of Naval Intelligence Division were checked prior to printing off. In addition to the contributions made to the work of these two service Departments, assistance and information was given from time to time to various Government Departments such as the Ministry of Supply, the Ministry of Economic Warfare, the Ministry of Works and Buildings, the Imperial War Graves Commission, the Ministry of Information, the Ministry of Aircraft Production, and to the scientific liaison officers of the Dominion Governments.

== See also ==
- Army Map Service
- Military Geology Unit
- National Geospatial-Intelligence Agency

== Bibliography ==
- Rose, Edward P. F. and Clatworthy, Jonathan C. 2007. "Specialist Maps of the Geological Section, Inter-Service Topographical Department: Aids to British Military Planning during World War II." Cartographic Journal. Maney Publishing: 02. Volume 44, Issue 1, pp. 13–43. Descriptors: Geology—Maps; Geological mapping; Maps, Military; Cartography; Maps. Abstract: Between November 1943 and May 1946, geologists assisted the Inter-Service Topographical Department (ISTD) to prepare reports and maps to guide planning of British military operations in Europe and the Far East. Early reports were illustrated by pre-war geological maps reprinted by the Geographical Section, General Staff, (GSGS), later reports by new simplified geological maps, usually accompanied by one or more thematic maps. An airfield suitability map for Bulgaria and soils maps for both the Middle Danube region (Hungary) and Austria were printed as part of the GSGS Miscellaneous map series, and groundwater and soils maps prepared as tracing overlays for use with topographical maps for parts of Germany. Simplified geological maps were prepared by ISTD and printed by GSGS for Sumatra, Borneo, Formosa, the Kra Isthmus region of the Burma/Thailand peninsula, Siam (Thailand) and Indo-China, Java, Hainan, and the Hong Kong to Canton region of China. These were mostly at a scale of 1:1000 000 but in varying styles, to innovatively indicate terrain features of specific military significance. Airfield suitability maps were printed at scales between 1:250 000 and 1:1000 000 for many of these regions, based on ground features and predicted soil permeability. All these specialist maps were printed in small numbers, and few copies have survived the war – notably in the British Library, the National Archives, or the library of the Royal Geographical Society. The ISTD Geological Section constituted the larger of only two teams of British military geologists to be established in either World War, exercising a role in military intelligence that is seldom acknowledged. ISSN 0008-7041.
- Farrington, J.L., 1946, History of the Geological Section Inter Services Topographical Department October 1943 - June 1946. ii + 41 pages, appendix 4 pages. Unpublished report. [The only known copy of this typescript is preserved in the F. W. Shotton Archive at the Lapworth Museum of Geology, University of Birmingham, UK]
- Great Britain. 1943. Malaya 1:380,160, Series GSGS 4474. [S.l.]: Inter-Service Topographical Department.
- Special report on the Dutch ports of Delfzijl, Harlingen, Den Helder and IJmuiden. 1943. [London]: Inter-Service Topographical Department (ISTD).
- Great Britain. 1943. Norway town plans, Series GSGS 4419. [S.l.]: Inter-Service Topographical Department.
- Great Britain. 1944. Supplement to I.S.T.D. F/418: Indo-China, Kua Tieu to Mui Khe Ga : coast, beaches and exits. Inter-service Topographical Dept.
- The port and town of Amsterdam: with an account of the port of Zaandam. 1944. [London]: Inter-Service Topographical Department (ISTD).
- Great Britain. 1944. South-western France geography and climate. [Inter-service Topographical Dept.

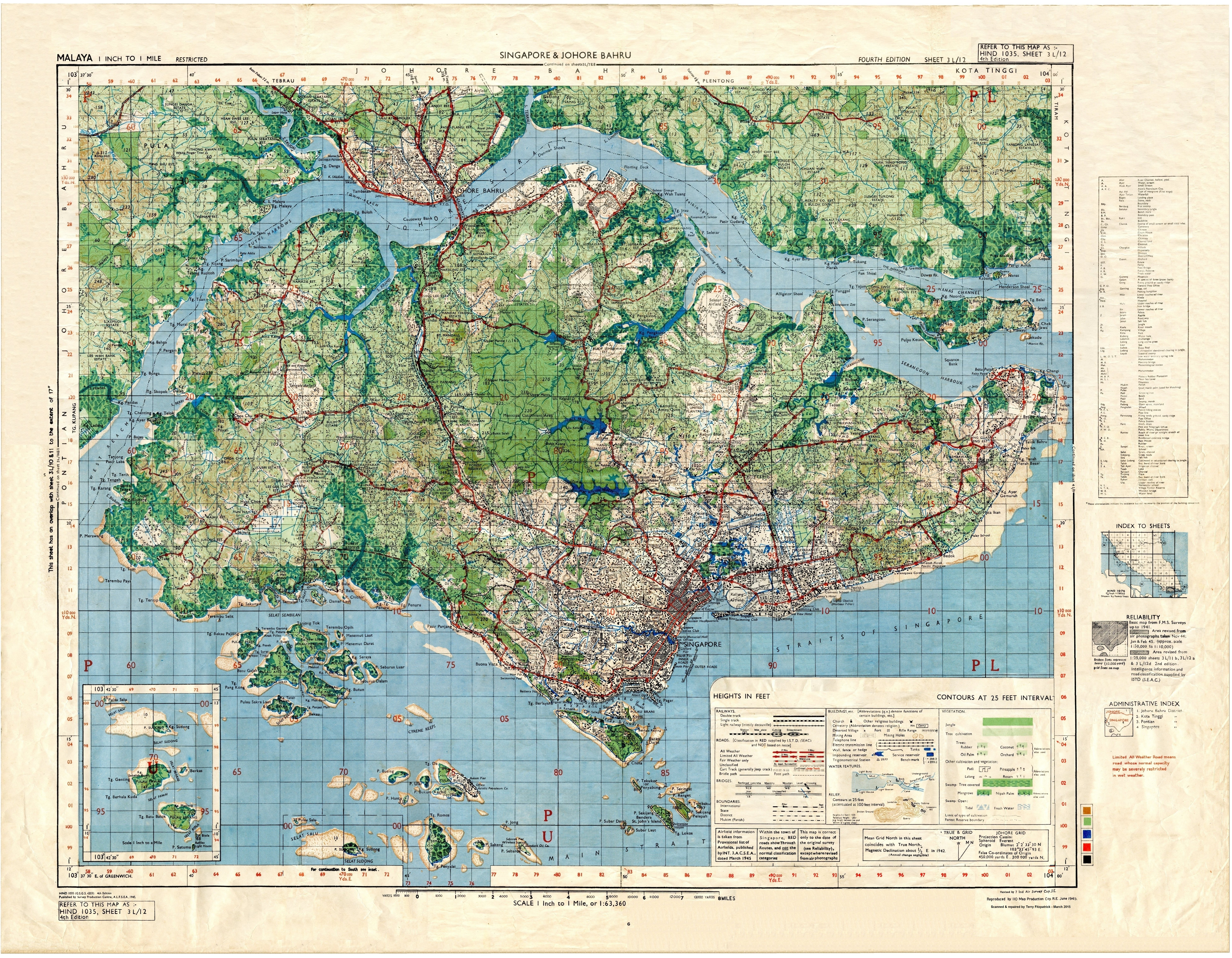
British Military map of Singapore - 1945

- HIND 1035; Sheet No. 3L/12; 4th Edition. 1945. S.l: s.n.]. Survey Production Centre, A.L.F.S.E.A. Alternate title: Singapore & Johore Bahru. In upper left margin: "Malaya 1 inch to 1 mile." In lower right margin: "Revised by 7th Ind Air Survey Coy., R.E. Reproduced by 110 Map Production Coy. R.E. June, 1945." Relief shown by contours at 25 feet intervals. Reliability: Basic map from F.M.S. Surveys up to 1941; intelligence information and road classification supplied by ISTD (S.E.A.C.). Includes extension to the south.
- Great Britain. Inter-service Topographical Department. 1945. Greater Berlin area. [London]: The Department. v. 1. Road bridges.--v. 2. Public utilities and oil storage.
- ISTD (SEAC) report on lower Burma. 1945. [S.l.]: Inter-Service Topographical Dept., (S.E.A.C.).
- Great Britain. 1945. Routes in Malaya: routes "E" : Johore and Singapore. London: s.n.. At head of title: ISTD (SEAC)/C/144. "25 June 1945, HQ SAC SEA." Includes index. 91 p. : ill., map; 18 cm.
- School of Military Intelligence (Great Britain), and Great Britain. 1945. Military topography of the tropical Far East. The Department. prepared by School of Military Intelligence, Matlock and Inter-Service Topographical Department.
- Great Britain. 2000. I.S.T.D. special report on certain railways of South-west Germany. [London]: Inter-service Topographical Dept. "January, 1944." ISTD special report on certain railways of South-west Germany. Inter-service Topographical Department special report on certain railways of South-west Germany. Certain railways of South-west Germany.
