= Harris Manchester College, Oxford =

College of University of Oxford

Harris Manchester College
- University of Oxford
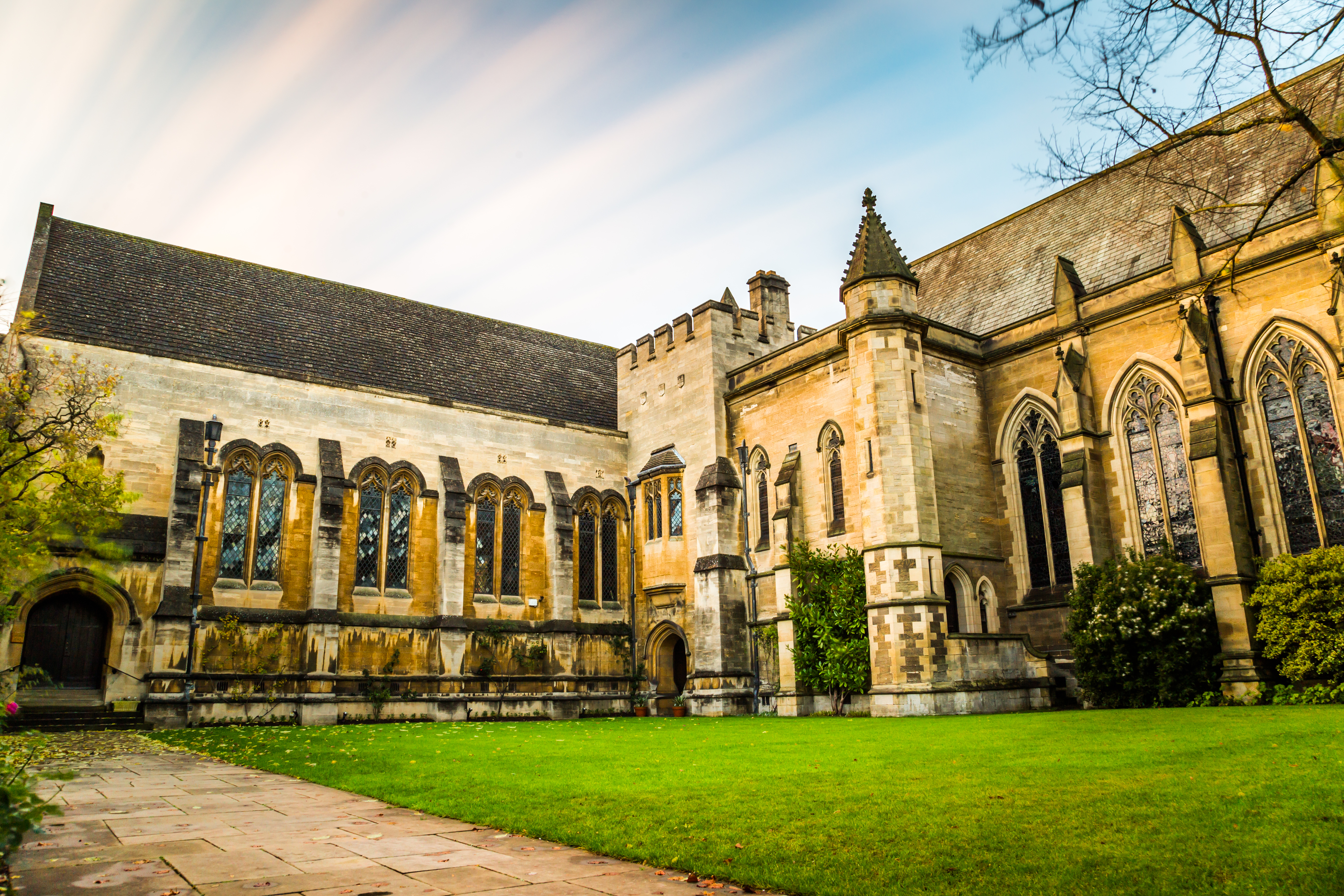
- Harris Manchester College Arlosh Quad

- Arms: Gules two torches inflamed in saltire proper, on a chief argent, between two roses of the field barbed and seeded, an open book also proper.
- Location: Mansfield Road (map)
- Coordinates: 51.755758°N 1.252044°W
- Full name: Manchester Academy and Harris College
- Latin name: Collegium de Harris et Manchester
- Abbreviation: HMC
- Motto: Veritas Libertas Pietas (Latin)
- Motto in English: Truth, Freedom, Piety
- Established: 1786; 240 years ago
- Named after: Philip Harris, Baron Harris of Peckham
- Former names: Warrington Academy, Manchester Academy and Manchester College
- Architect: Thomas Worthington
- Sister college: Homerton College, Cambridge
- Principal: Beth Breeze
- Undergraduates: 113 (2020)
- Postgraduates: 178 (2020)
- Endowment: £14.4 million (2020)
- Website: www.hmc.ox.ac.uk

Map
- Location within Oxford city centre

Harris Manchester College (HMC), officially Manchester Academy and Harris College, is a constituent college of the University of Oxford in the United Kingdom.

It was founded in Warrington in 1757 as the Warrington Academy, a college for Unitarian students and moved to Oxford in 1893. It became a full college of the university in 1996, taking its current name after its predecessor, the Manchester Academy, and donor Lord Harris of Peckham.

== History ==
=== Foundation and relocation ===
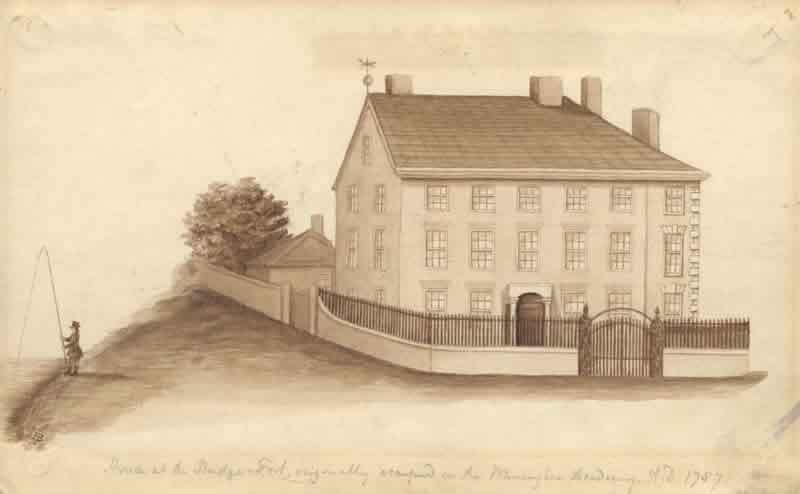
Warrington Academy

The college started as the Warrington Academy in 1757 where its teachers included Joseph Priestley, before being refounded as the Manchester Academy in Manchester in 1786. Originally run by English Presbyterians, it was one of several dissenting academies that provided religious nonconformists with higher education, as at the time the only universities in England – Oxford and Cambridge – were restricted to Anglicans. It taught theology, science, modern languages, language, history and classics. Its most famous professor was John Dalton, developer of atomic theory.

The college changed its location five times before settling in Oxford. It was located in Manchester between 1786 and 1803, York until 1840, Manchester again between 1840 and 1853, and University Hall, Gordon Square, London, until 1889. In York, it was located at 38 Monkgate, just outside Monkbar; later this was the first building of the College of Ripon and York St John (now York St John University). The key person in York was Charles Wellbeloved, a Unitarian minister. In 1840, when he retired, the college moved back to Manchester, where it stayed until 1853.

In 1840, the college started an association with the University of London, and gained the right to present students for degrees from London. Between 1853 and 1889 the college was located in University Hall, Gordon Square. In 1901, Gertrude von Petzold graduated from her training at Manchester College to become a minister in the Unitarian church, the first woman to be qualified as a minister in England. This was possible as the University of London became the first UK university to award degrees to women in 1878.

From London it moved to Oxford, opening its new buildings in 1893. In Oxford, the Unitarian Manchester College was viewed with alarm by orthodox Anglicans. William Sanday was warned that his presence at the official opening of 'an institution which professedly allows such fundamental Christian truths as the Holy Trinity and the Incarnation to be treated as open questions' would 'tend to the severance of the friendly relation subsisting between the university and the Church'.

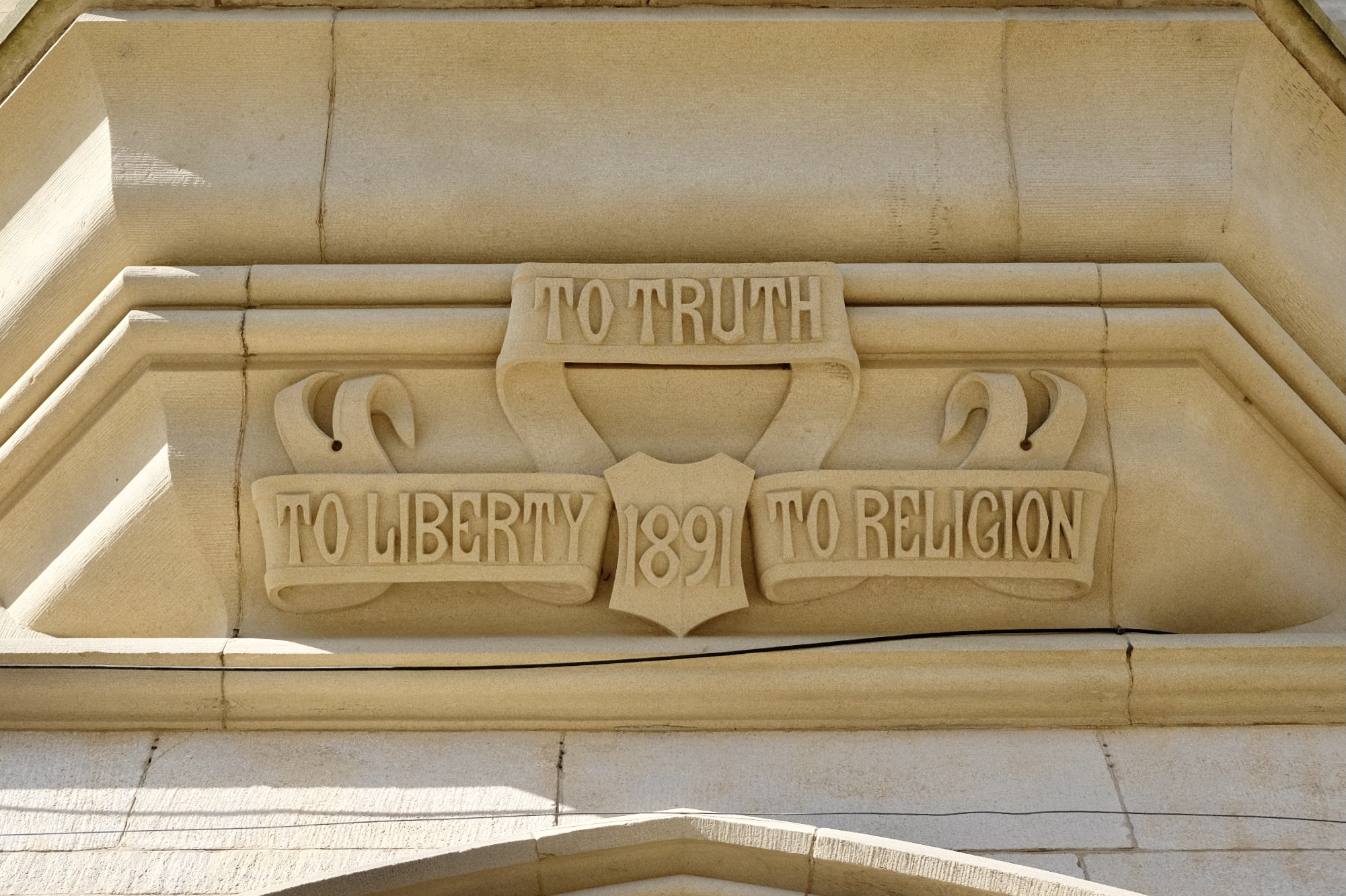
College Motto inscribed above Main Building entrance (2021)

=== World War II ===
The Ministry of Works and Buildings requisitioned most of the college's buildings on 17 October 1941 to facilitate the Naval Intelligence and the Inter-Services Topographic Department (ISTD). ISTD operations focussed on gathering of topographical intelligence for the day when the Allies would return to continental Europe. The ISTD section housed in Manchester College played a role in the planning of the D-Day landings on 6 June 1944. The college's Arlosh Hall served as the main centre of operations, with Nissen huts and tents put up in the quads.

=== Modern day ===
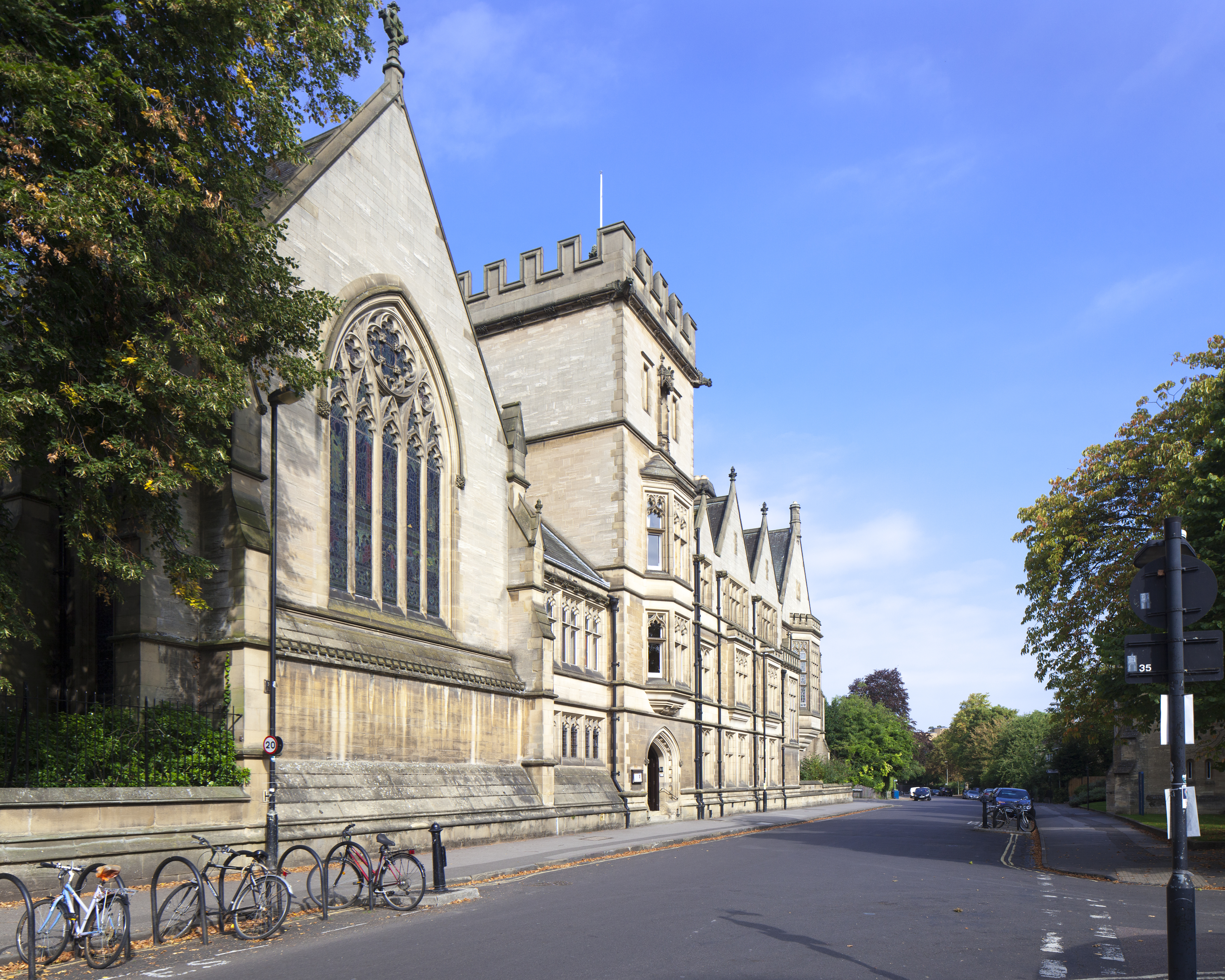
College's Mansfield Road facade (2014)

Manchester College became a permanent private hall of Oxford University in 1990 and subsequently a full constituent college, being granted a royal charter in 1996. At the same time, it changed its name to Harris Manchester College in recognition of a donation by Philip Harris, Baron Harris of Peckham.

The college houses several research centres, including the Commercial Law Centre, directed by Kristin van Zwieten; and the Wellbeing Research Centre, directed by Jan-Emmanuel De Neve.

=== Principal ===
Since October 2025 the principal of the college has been the sociologist Beth Breeze.

== Buildings ==
The main quad was designed by architect Thomas Worthington, and built between 1889 and 1893. It houses the Tate Library and the chapel. The chapel contains stained-glass windows by the Pre-Raphaelite artists Sir Edward Burne-Jones and William Morris, as well as an organ painted by Morris and Co.

The Arlosh hall, designed by Percy Worthington, was added in 1913. In 2013–2014 the Siew-Sngiem Clock Tower & Sukum Navapan Gate were added to the Arlosh quad. The inscription on the tower "It is later than you think, but it is never too late", refers to the role of the college in educating mature students.

=== Gallery ===
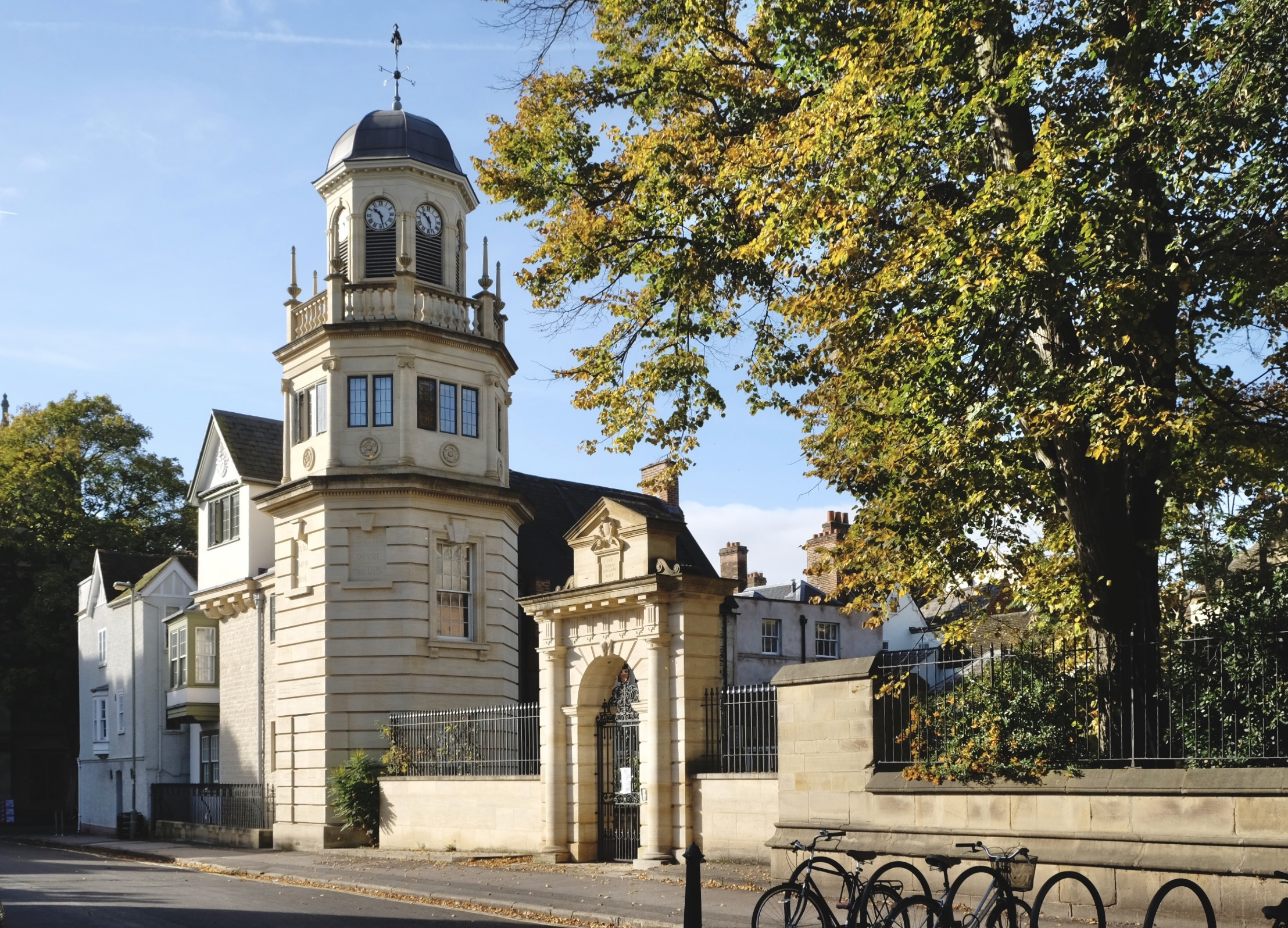
Siew-Sngiem Clock Tower and Sukum Navapan Gate

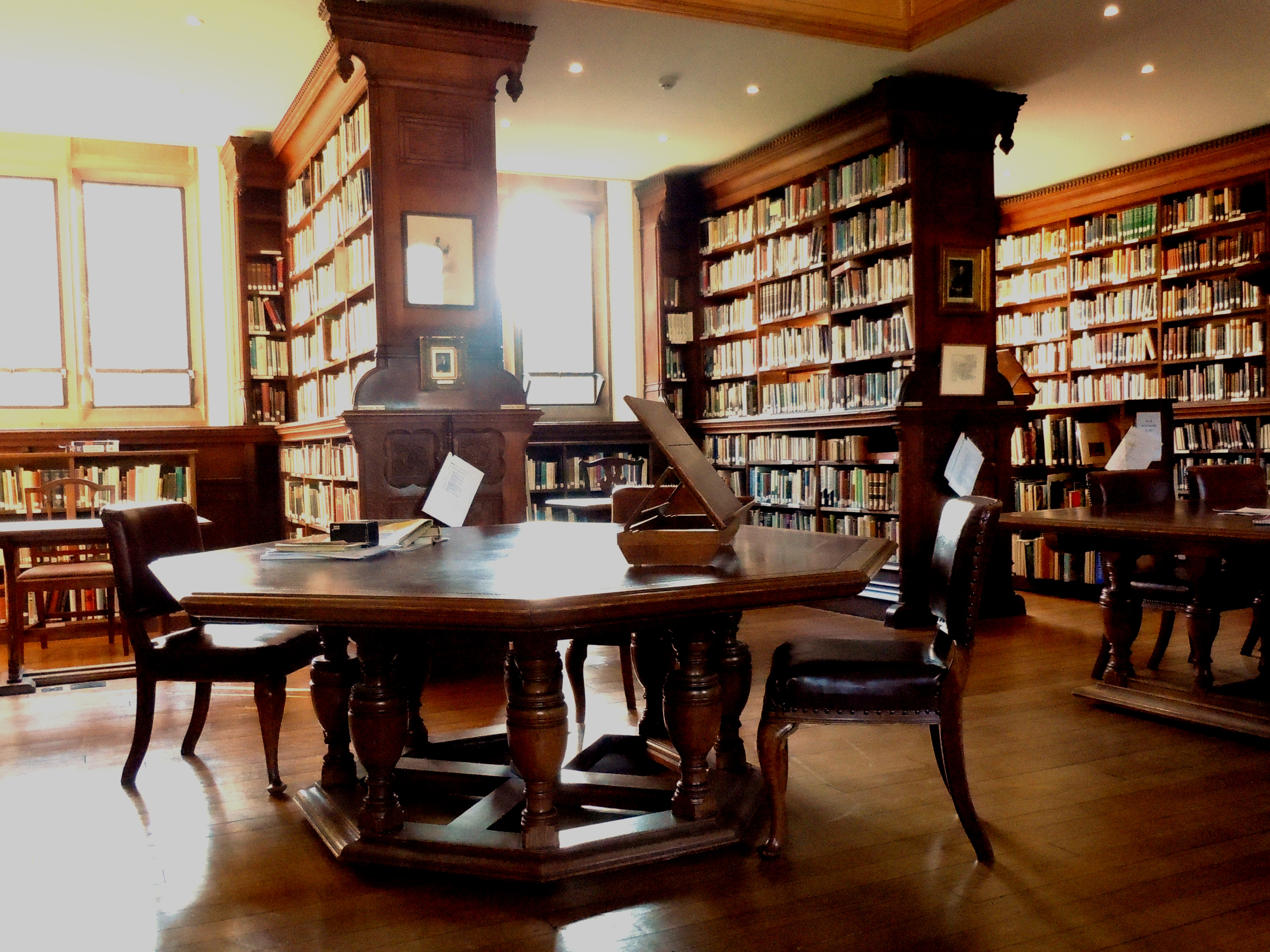
Tate Library

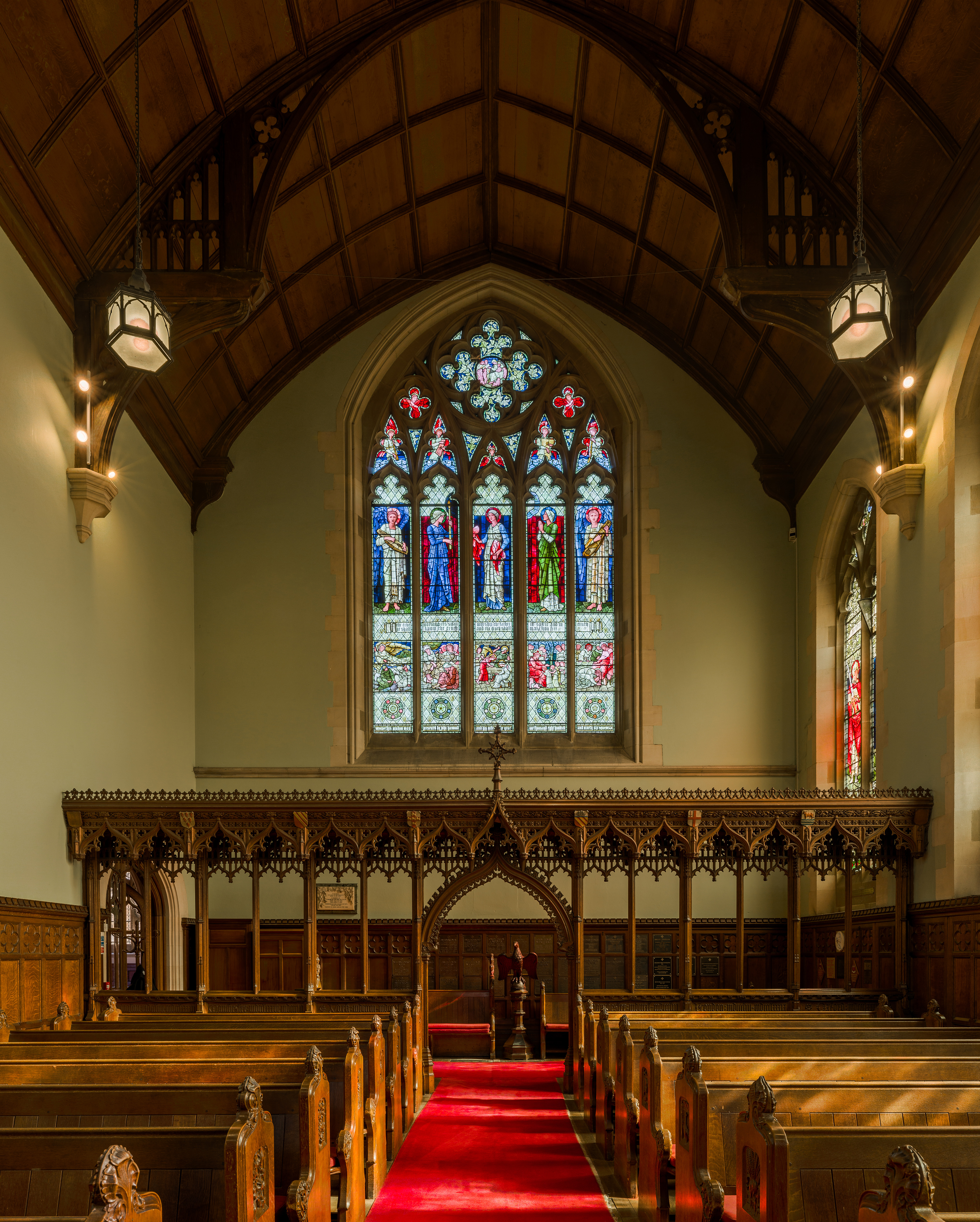
Stained-glass windows of chapel

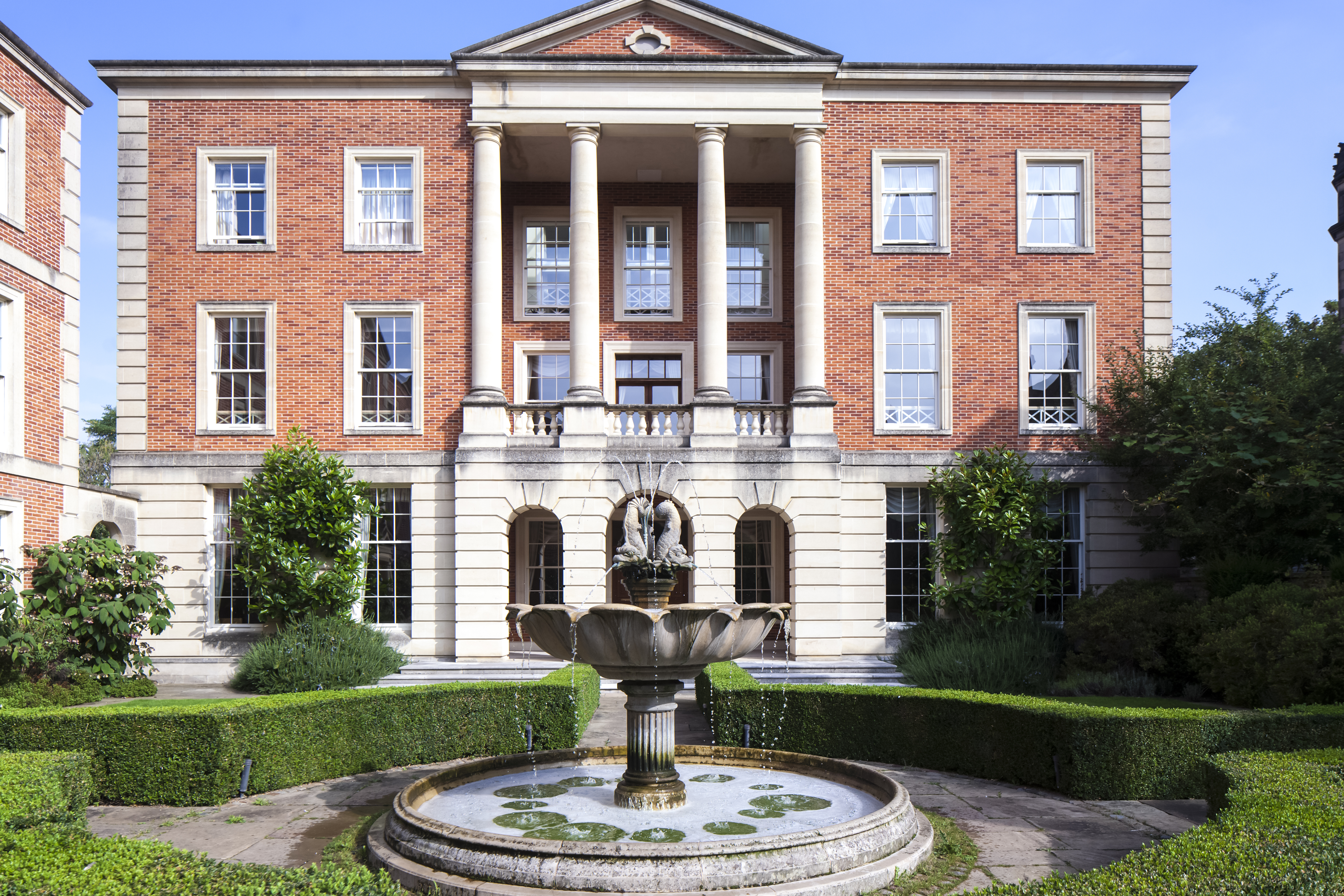
College grounds

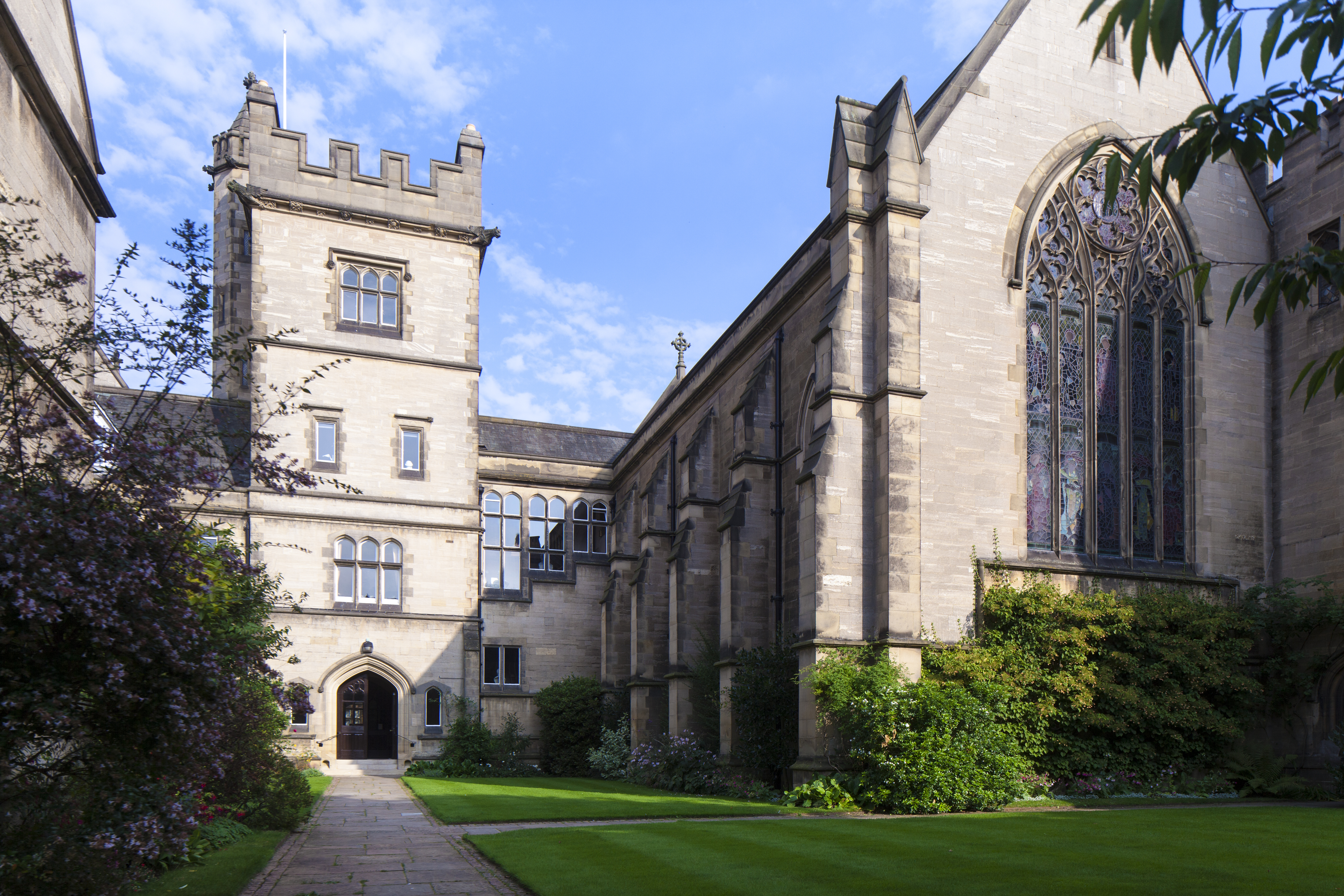
Exterior of chapel

== Notable people ==
People associated with Harris Manchester College

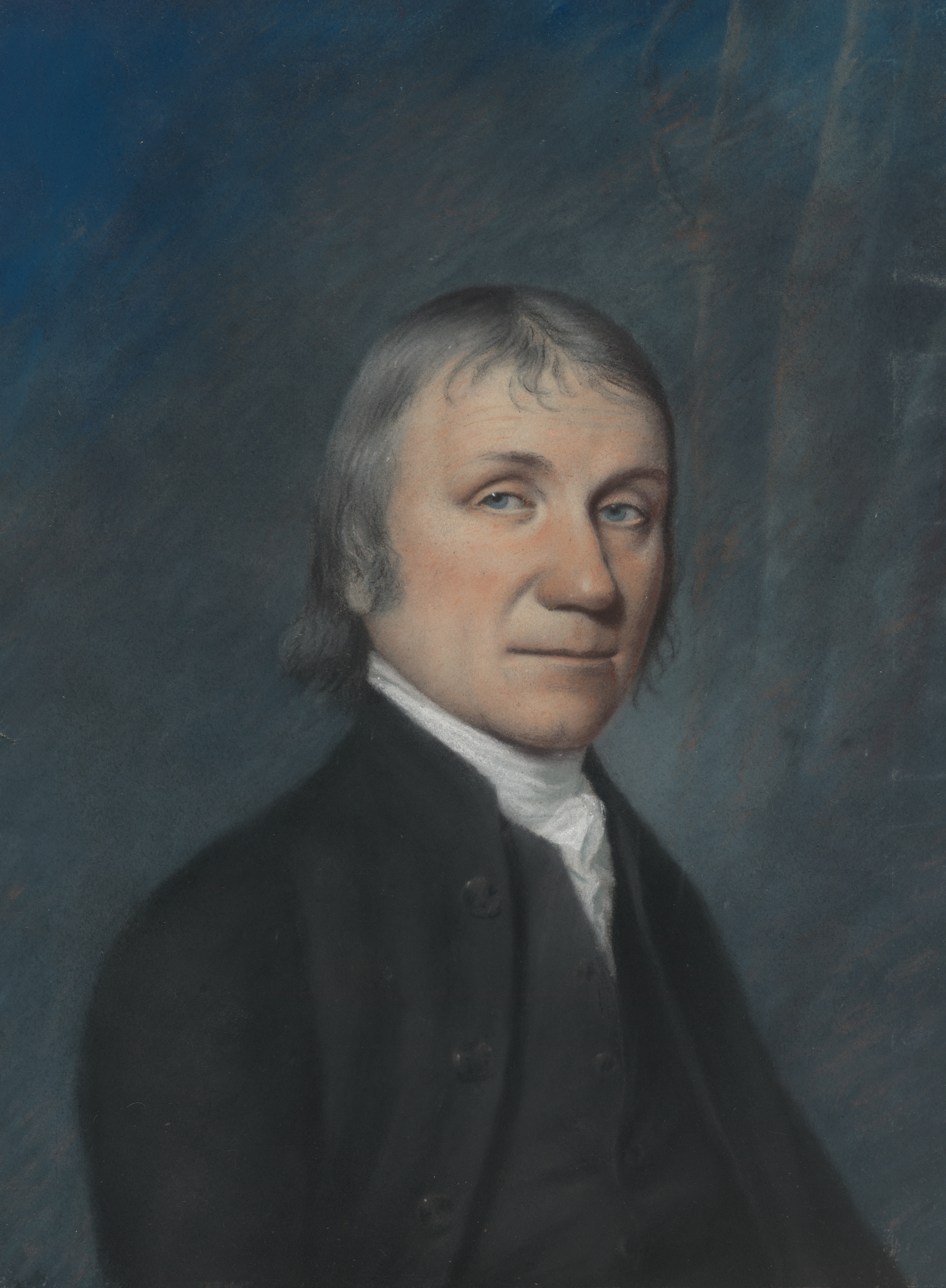
Joseph Priestley, (Warrington Academy) Credited with discovery of oxygen

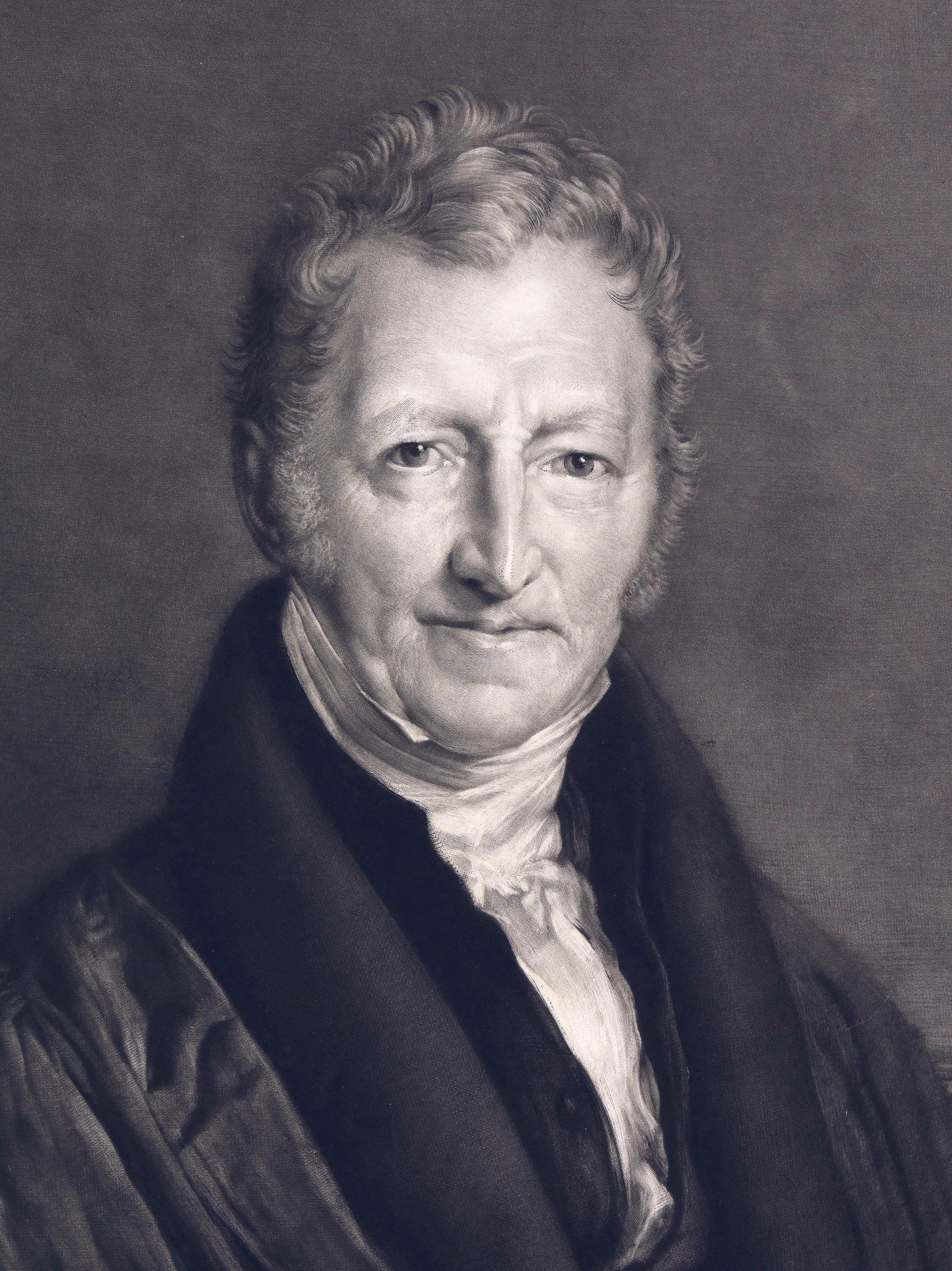
Thomas Malthus, (Warrington Academy), British political economist

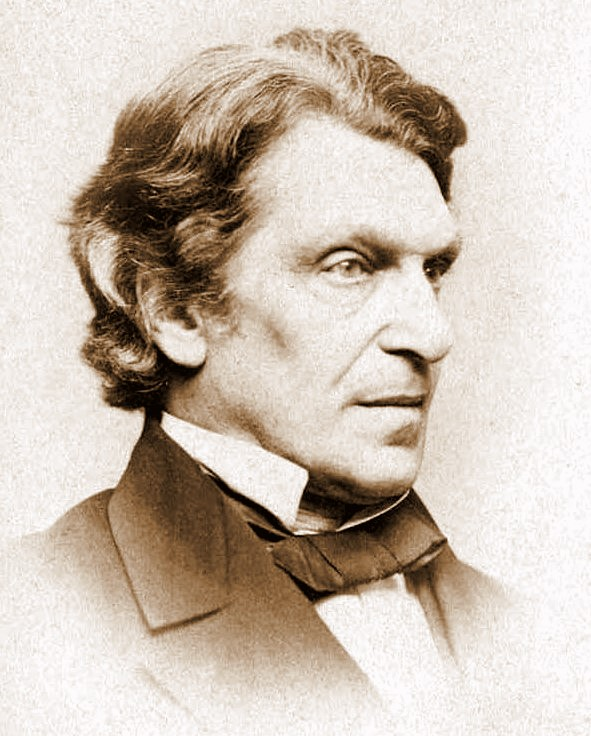
James Martineau (Manchester College, York), English religious philosopher

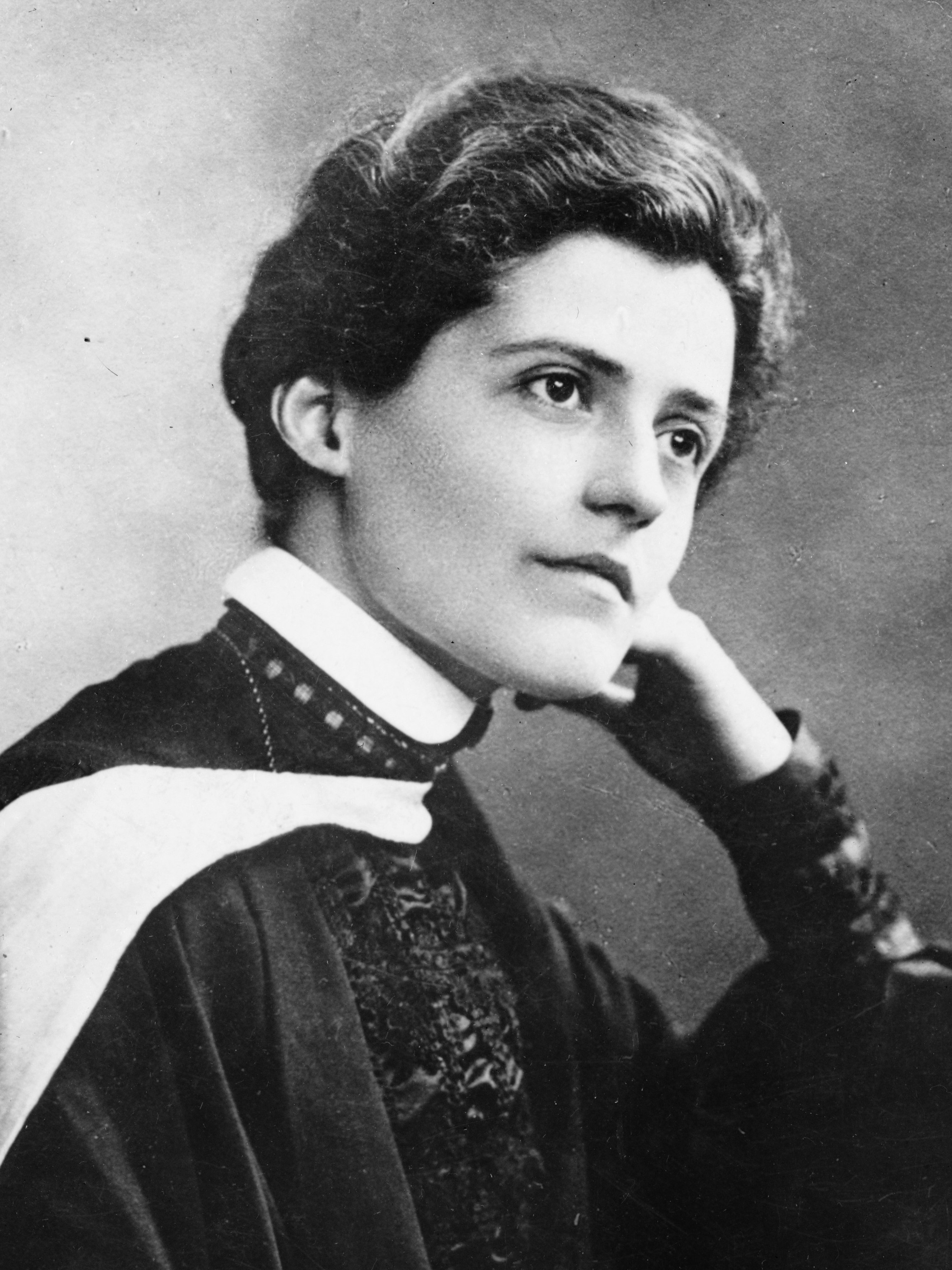
Gertrude von Petzold (Manchester College), First woman church minister in England

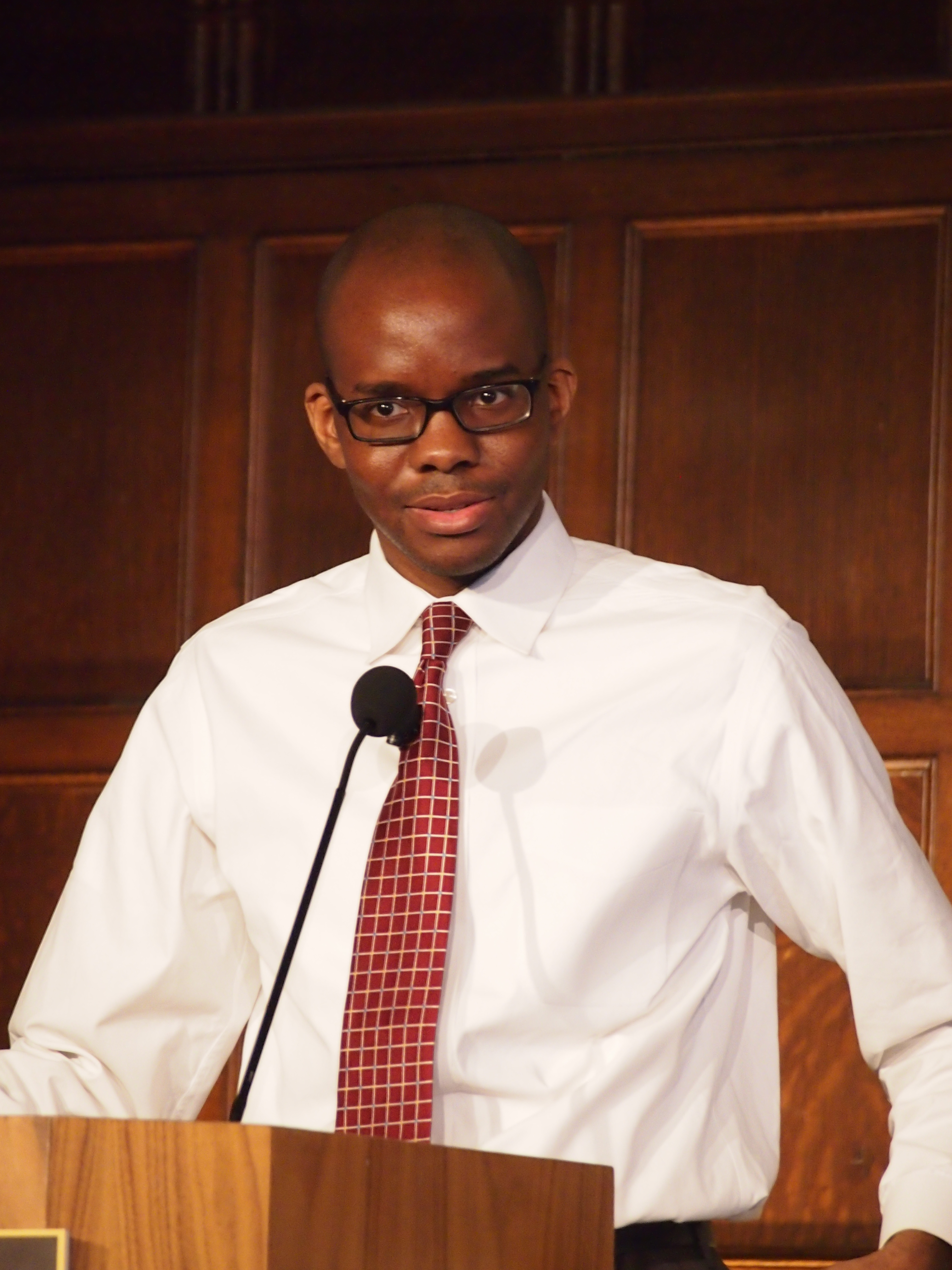
Tope Folarin (Harris Manchester College), Nigerian-American writer

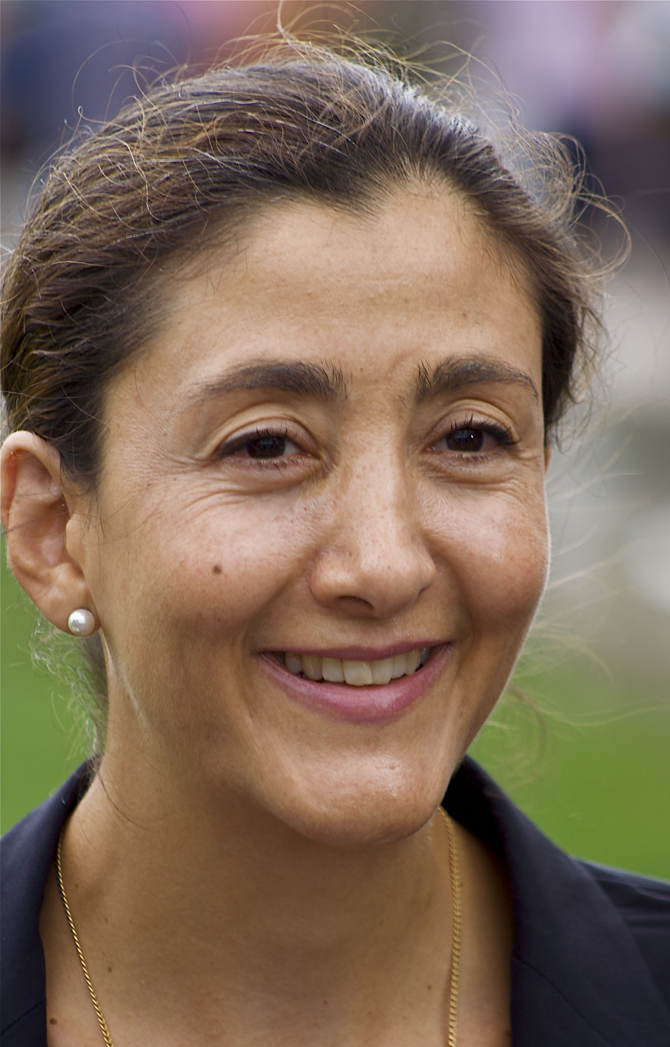
Íngrid Betancourt (Harris Manchester College), Colombian senator and anti-corruption activist

=== People associated with Harris Manchester ===
- James Kitson, 1st Baron Airedale, President of Manchester College, Oxford 1909-1911
- Joseph Lupton, President of Manchester New College
- James Martineau, President of Manchester New College (1869–1885)
- Peter Finch Martineau, Vice-President of the college (1815–1834)
- Francis William Newman, Classics Professor at Manchester New College
- Thomas Percival, English physician, one of first students enrolled at Warrington Academy
- Joseph Priestley, Credited with discovery of oxygen, tutor at the Warrington Academy
- John James Tayler, Unitarian Minister, Classical Tutor at Manchester College, York
- Charles Wellbeloved, Principal of Manchester College, York (1803–1840)

=== Alumni ===
- Íngrid Betancourt, Colombian politician, former senator and anti-corruption activist
- Sir Edward Henry Busk, Vice Chancellor of the University of London, Fellow of University College, London, and a Member of the Governing Body of Imperial College
- Jocelyn Davies, Member of the Welsh Parliament
- Zoe de Toledo, Silver Medalist, 2016 Summer Olympics, Rowing W8+
- V. A. Demant, Regius Professor of Moral and Pastoral Theology and Canon of Christ Church, Oxford, member of the Wolfenden Committee
- Tope Folarin, Nigerian-American writer, winner of the 2013 Caine Prize for African Writing
- Deborah Frances-White, comedian
- Sandra Gregory
- Karen Harrison, first female train driver in Britain and first woman to preside over the ASLEF Annual Assembly of Delegates
- Albert McElroy, chair of the Northern Ireland Labour Party
- Vivien Noakes, expert on Edward Lear and the literature of World War I, fellow of the Royal Society of Literature, lecturer at Harvard University and the Yale Center for British Art
- Gertrude von Petzold, first woman to be appointed for church ministry in England
- Oliver Popplewell, judge of the High Court of England and Wales
- Joe Roff, international rugby player
- Lanto Sheridan, international polo player
- Dwayne Whylly, Bahamas national football team goalkeeper
- Lord Nicholas Windsor

== Controversies ==
=== 2017 racial discrimination allegations ===
In 2017, the college warned students to be "vigilant" after a man who was not a student of Harris Manchester was spotted on the college grounds and circulated CCTV images of the person. After the college email was leaked to the public, he accused the college, in a Guardian op-ed, of sharing a "criminalised image" of him, because of his skin colour.

=== 2020 sex offender incident ===
In 2020, a PhD student of the college was convicted and sentenced to prison after attempting to solicit sex from a 14-year old boy in his accommodation.

== See also ==
- List of dissenting academies (19th century)
