= Multi-area agreement =

Agreement

A multi-area agreement (MAA) was an English political framework that aimed to encourage cross boundary partnership working at the regional and sub-regional levels. They were defined by the Department for Communities and Local Government (DCLG) as voluntary agreements between two or more top tier (county councils or metropolitan district councils) or unitary local authorities, their partners and the government to work collectively to improve local economic prosperity.

There were 15 signed off multi-area agreements in England: However, these were folded into the new Local Enterprise Partnerships created by the Conservative/Liberal Democrat coalition government and were finally repealed under the Deregulation Act 2015.

MAA name	Local authorities	Established
Bournemouth, Dorset and Poole	Bournemouth, Poole, Dorset: Christchurch, East Dorset, North Dorset, Purbeck, West Dorset, Weymouth, Portland	July 2008
Greater Manchester	Bolton, Bury, Manchester, Oldham, Rochdale, Salford, Stockport, Tameside, Trafford, Wigan	July 2008
Leeds City Region	Barnsley, Bradford, Calderdale, Kirklees, Leeds, Wakefield, York, North Yorkshire: Selby, Craven, Harrogate	July 2008
Partnership for Urban South Hampshire (PUSH)	Portsmouth, Southampton, Hampshire: East Hampshire, Eastleigh, Fareham, Gosport, Havant, New Forest, Test Valley, Winchester	July 2008
South Yorkshire	Sheffield, Doncaster, Rotherham, Barnsley	July 2008
Tees Valley	Darlington, Middlesbrough, Redcar and Cleveland, Hartlepool, Stockton-on-Tees	July 2008
Tyne and Wear	Gateshead, Newcastle, North Tyneside, South Tyneside, Sunderland, Durham, Northumberland	July 2008
Leicester and Leicestershire	Leicester, Leicestershire: Blaby, Charnwood, Harborough, Hinckley and Bosworth, Melton, North West Leicestershire, Oadby and Wigston	January 2009
Liverpool City Region	Halton, Knowsley, Liverpool, Sefton, St Helens, Wirral	January 2009
Pennine Lancashire	Blackburn with Darwen, Lancashire: Burnley, Hyndburn, Pendle, Ribble Valley, Rossendale	January 2009
Birmingham, Coventry and Black Country City Region	Birmingham, Dudley, Sandwell, Solihull, Walsall, Wolverhampton	September 2009
North Kent	Medway, Kent: Gravesham, Swale, Dartford	September 2009
West of England Partnership	Bath and North East Somerset, Bristol, North Somerset, South Gloucestershire	September 2009
Fylde Coast	Blackpool, Lancashire: Fylde, Wyre	October 2009
Olympic Boroughs	Greenwich, Hackney, Newham, Tower Hamlets, Waltham Forest	March 2010

Additionally there were five areas who were in negotiations with DCLG regarding the development of an MAA:

- Gatwick Diamond
- Hull and Humber
- Milton Keynes South Midlands
- Nottingham
- Regional Cities East
