= Yorcard =

Smart card for public transport in Yorkshire

Yorcard was an electronic smart card ticketing programme in Yorkshire. It grew from the pilot of the same name completed in 2009. Yorcard Limited was a not-for-profit company limited by guarantee. Its two guarantors were the South Yorkshire Passenger Transport Executive and West Yorkshire Metro. The company's mission was to create a multi-operator smart ticketing system in the whole of the region of Yorkshire and the Humber, ensuring that provision is made to support (especially) smaller operators, multi-operator travel card organisations and regional local authorities. One of the strands of Yorcard's integrated ticketing strategy is to provide a very low-cost pre-paid smart card solution (similar in concept to Oyster's "Pay as You Go" product) for use by all the transport operators in the region.

A trial of LASSEO based encoding was trialled in 2010 to see how the card could be used to allow citizens access to leisure and library services.
