= Local enterprise partnership =

Former economic development board in England

In England, local enterprise partnerships (LEPs) were voluntary partnerships between local authorities and businesses, set up in 2011 by the Department for Business, Innovation and Skills to help determine local economic priorities and lead economic growth and job creation within the local area. They carried out some of the functions previously carried out by the regional development agencies which were abolished in March 2012. In certain areas, funding was received from the UK government via growth deals. Funding for LEPs was withdrawn by the Rishi Sunak Conservative government in April 2024 and their functions were assumed by local authorities, some of whom have formed Business Boards as replacements.

== History ==
The abolition of regional development agencies and the creation of local enterprise partnerships were announced as part of the June 2010 United Kingdom budget. On 29 June 2010, a letter was sent from the Department for Communities and Local Government and the Department for Business, Innovation and Skills to local authority and business leaders, inviting proposals to replace regional development agencies in their areas by 6 September 2010. On 7 September 2010, details were released of 56 proposals for local enterprise partnerships that had been received. On 6 October 2010, during the Conservative Party Conference, it was revealed that 22 had been given the provisional 'green light' to proceed and others might later be accepted with amendments. 24 bids were announced as successful on 28 October 2010.

LEPs were set up on a voluntary basis without any public funding and struggled to make progress. A report by Michael Heseltine in October 2012, No Stone Unturned, was largely accepted by Government, and proposed delegating certain funds from central government to LEPs. Changes included:

- allocating a share of a £1,400m Local Growth Fund to generate growth, through competitive bidding;
- getting LEPs to draw up plans for local growth as the basis for negotiation on the money in the Fund
- realigning the management of the EU Structural and Investment Funds in England to follow the plans made by LEPs.

=== City deals ===
The LEP areas of Greater Birmingham and Solihull, Greater Manchester, Leeds City Region, North Eastern, Sheffield City Region, and West of England were included in the first wave of 'city deals' in 2012.

=== Growth deals ===
Local growth deals, for projects that benefit the local area and economy, began to be made to some LEPs in 2014.

=== Abolition and successor bodies ===
The Rishi Sunak Conservative government withdrew funding for the partnerships in April 2024 and transferred their functions to the Greater London Authority, combined authorities and upper-tier local authorities (i.e. county councils or unitary authorities).

In the months after funding was withdrawn from LEPs in April 2024, many local authorities and combined authorities formed Business Boards to assume the functions previously carried out by LEPs.

== List of LEPs ==
Local enterprise partnership areas were allowed to overlap, so a local authority was permitted to be part of more than one local enterprise partnership. (Note: The local authority areas taking part in two LEPs were Aylesbury Vale, Barnsley, Bassetlaw, Bolsover, Bromsgrove, Cannock Chase, Cherwell, Chesterfield, Croydon, Derbyshire Dales, East Hampshire, East Staffordshire, Forest Heath, Harrogate, King's Lynn and West Norfolk, Lewes, Lichfield, New Forest, North East Derbyshire, North East Lincolnshire, North Hertfordshire, North Lincolnshire, Redditch, St Edmundsbury, Tamworth, Test Valley, Uttlesford, Winchester, Wyre Forest and York.) After the March 2017 merger of Northamptonshire LEP into South East Midlands LEP, there were 38 local enterprise partnerships in operation.

Partnership	Areas
Black Country	West Midlands (part): Dudley, Sandwell, Walsall, Wolverhampton
Buckinghamshire (Note: Overlaps with other LEPs)	Buckinghamshire (all)
Cheshire and Warrington	Cheshire East (unitary); Cheshire West and Chester (unitary); Warrington (unitary)
Coast to Capital	Brighton and Hove (unitary); East Sussex (part): Lewes; Greater London (part): Croydon; Surrey (part): Epsom and Ewell, Mole Valley, Reigate and Banstead, Tandridge; West Sussex (all)
Cornwall and Isles of Scilly	Cornwall (unitary); Isles of Scilly (unitary)
Coventry and Warwickshire	Warwickshire (all); West Midlands (part): Coventry
Cumbria	Cumberland (unitary); Westmorland and Furness (unitary)
Derby, Derbyshire, Nottingham and Nottinghamshire Local Enterprise Partnership	Derby (unitary); Derbyshire (all); Nottingham (unitary); Nottinghamshire (all)
Dorset	Bournemouth (unitary); Dorset (all); Poole (unitary)
Enterprise M3	Hampshire (part): Basingstoke and Deane, East Hampshire, Hart, New Forest, Rushmoor, Test Valley, Winchester; Surrey (part): Elmbridge, Guildford, Runnymede, Spelthorne, Surrey Heath, Waverley, Woking
GFirst	Gloucestershire (all)
Greater Birmingham and Solihull	Staffordshire (part): Cannock Chase, East Staffordshire, Lichfield, Tamworth; West Midlands (part): Birmingham, Solihull; Worcestershire (part): Bromsgrove, Redditch, Wyre Forest
Cambridgeshire and Peterborough Business Board (part of combined authority) (Note: Formerly Greater Cambridge and Greater Peterborough)	Cambridgeshire (all); Essex (part): Uttlesford; Hertfordshire (part): North Hertfordshire; Norfolk (part): King's Lynn and West Norfolk; Suffolk (part): Forest Heath, St Edmundsbury; Peterborough (unitary); Previously: Rutland (unitary)
Greater Lincolnshire	Lincolnshire (all); North Lincolnshire (unitary); North East Lincolnshire (unitary); Rutland (from May 2020)
Greater Manchester Business Board (part of combined authority)	Greater Manchester (all)
Heart of the South West	Devon (all); Somerset (all)
Hertfordshire	Hertfordshire (all)
Humber	East Riding of Yorkshire (unitary); Kingston upon Hull (unitary); Previously: North East Lincolnshire (unitary); Previously North Lincolnshire (unitary)
Lancashire	Lancashire (all); Blackburn with Darwen (unitary); Blackpool (unitary)
Leeds City Region (part of combined authority)	West Yorkshire (all); North Yorkshire (part)
Leicester and Leicestershire	Leicester (unitary); Leicestershire (all)
Liverpool City Region (part of combined authority)	Halton (unitary); Merseyside (all)
London Enterprise Panel (part of devolved authority) (Note: Advisory role only; economic functions are the responsibility of the Mayor of London)	Greater London (all)
New Anglia	Norfolk (all); Suffolk (all)
North East	County Durham (unitary); Northumberland (unitary); Tyne and Wear (all)
Oxfordshire	Oxfordshire (all)
South Yorkshire (Note: Formerly Sheffield City Region) (part of combined authority)	Derbyshire (part): Bolsover, Chesterfield, Derbyshire Dales, North East Derbyshire; Nottinghamshire (part): Bassetlaw; South Yorkshire (all)
Solent	Hampshire (part): East Hampshire, Eastleigh, Fareham, Gosport, Havant, New Forest, Test Valley, Winchester; Isle of Wight (unitary); Portsmouth (unitary); Southampton (unitary)
South East	East Sussex (all); Essex (all); Kent (all); Medway (unitary); Southend-on-Sea (unitary); Thurrock (unitary)
South East Midlands	Bedford (unitary); Buckinghamshire (part): Aylesbury Vale; Central Bedfordshire (unitary); Luton (unitary); Milton Keynes (unitary); Northamptonshire (all); Oxfordshire (part): Cherwell
Stoke-on-Trent and Staffordshire	Staffordshire (all); Stoke-on-Trent (unitary)
Swindon and Wiltshire	Swindon (unitary); Wiltshire (unitary)
Tees Valley (part of combined authority)	Darlington (unitary); Hartlepool (unitary); Middlesbrough (unitary); Redcar and Cleveland (unitary); Stockton-on-Tees (unitary)
Thames Valley Berkshire	Bracknell Forest (unitary); Reading (unitary); Slough (unitary); West Berkshire (unitary); Windsor and Maidenhead (unitary); Wokingham (unitary)
The Marches	Herefordshire (unitary); Shropshire (unitary); Telford and Wrekin (unitary)
West of England (part of combined authority)	Bath and North East Somerset (unitary); Bristol (unitary); North Somerset (unitary); South Gloucestershire (unitary)
Worcestershire	Worcestershire (all)
York and North Yorkshire	North Yorkshire (all); York (unitary)

== See also ==
- Local government in England
- History of local government in England
- Multi-area agreement
- Local strategic partnership
- Local transport bodies
- Combined authority
