= Youth and Philanthropy Initiative =

Youth Program

The Youth and Philanthropy Initiative, also known as YPI, is an educational pogram that teaches secondary school students the fundamentals of philanthropy, and gives students the opportunity to play a direct role in making a financial grant to a local, grassroots social service organization in their own community.

== Overview ==
YPI takes place in secondary schools in North America and the UK. Students begin their YPI experience by taking part in an introductory workshop, forming teams, and working together to identify the social issues that are prevalent in their own community. Once they have identified these social issues, students select one issue as their focus, and search for local grassroots charities that exist in their community to assist vulnerable members of the local population.

Student teams select the charity they believe best addresses their chosen issue and begin preliminary research into the charity, its mandate and its activities. Teams contact and visit their chosen charity, conducting interviews to gain a greater understanding of what the charity does, how it operates, the challenges it faces, and how it can be supported by young people and the larger community. Students then develop a presentation supporting the section of their charity explaining how to propsosed grant would be used. The presentations are delivered in the classroom, and finalists are selected to present to a larger audience and a panel of judges as part of the YPI Final Presentation Assembly. The judging panel selects one winning group to receive a $5,000 (£3,000) grant for their chosen charity.

YPI is currently run in 370 schools to over 50,000 students annually in North America and the UK.

Grants delivered through YPI total over $11,000,000 CAD as of November 2014.

== History ==
YPI was developed by the Tuskan Casale Foundation (founded in 2001, by Frank Tuskan, Victor Casale, and Julie Tuskan-Casale), a family foundation situated in Toronto, Canada, that is dedicated to supporting and strengthening local, community-based social service agencies.

YPI was first piloted in 2002, at Royal St. George's College, in Toronto.

In 2003, YPI took place in 29 schools across Ontario. By 2005, YPI was being run in British Columbia, Alberta and Quebec.

In partnership with the Institute for Philanthropy, YPI International was launched in 2006 and piloted in London, England. The following year YPI was in 10 schools across England.

YPI launched in Scotland in 2008 with the support of Sir Ian Wood and The Wood Foundation.

In 2009, the YPI launched in New York City, and through 2010 and 2011 began to be run in Atlantic Canada and Northern Ireland.

In 2010, YPI was presented with the Best Practice Award in Civic Education by the Institute for Canadian Citizenship. In 2011, YPI's president Julie Tuskan-Casale was honored with the first-ever Premier's Award for Philanthropy in Education.

In 2012, YPI celebrated over £1 million donated to UK charities throughout England, Northern Ireland and Scotland, since 2006.

YPI celebrated its 10th anniversary during the 2012-2013 academic year.

In 2014, YPI celebrated over ten million dollars donated internationally to community-based, social service charities.

== YPI Canada ==
YPI is currently run in 158 schools across Canada, with an estimated 26,000 students participating. The École des Sentiers at Quebec City is the only francophone school to participate.

A total of $7,375,000 has been granted to Canadian charities through YPI.

In the 2012-13 academic year, 4,225 Canadian charities were advocated for through YPI and an estimated 61,000 people will directly benefit from YPI grants to charities. YPI students reached an estimated 182,000 Canadians with their presentations and information on their charities.

YPI launched in Canada in 2002.

== YPI Northern Ireland ==
YPI is currently run-in schools across Northern Ireland with an estimated 2,250 students participating.

YPI launched in Northern Ireland in 2011.

== YPI Scotland ==
YPI is currently run in 255 schools in Scotland, with an estimated 34,000 students participating (academic year 2018/19).

Nearly £4,000,000 has been granted to charities in Scotland through YPI.

YPI launched in Scotland in 2008 with the support of The Wood Foundation.

== YPI USA ==
YPI is currently run in 8 schools in New York City, with an estimated 850 students participating.

A total of $150,000 has been granted to charities in New York City through YPI.

YPI launched in New York City in 2009.
