= Institute for Philanthropy =

- Founded: 2000
- Founder: Hilary Browne-Wilkinson
- Type: Operating public charity
- Purpose: Philanthropy
- Method: Research, Advice, Educational programs
- Key people: Dr Salvatore LaSpada, Chief Executive Nicholas Ferguson, Chairman
- Website: www.instituteforphilanthropy.org

The Institute for Philanthropy is a not-for-profit organisation which provides information and educational programmes to philanthropists and charitable organizations. Originally established in 2000 by Hilary Browne-Wilkinson, a former solicitor at University College London, the Institute currently operates from offices in London and New York.

The Institute carries out research about charitable organizations and charitable tax law, and provides advice to potential donors on the efficient utilisation of funding.

The Institute works to increase effective philanthropy in the United Kingdom and internationally, by raising awareness and understanding of philanthropy, providing donor education and building donor networks.

== Programmes ==
The Institute has developed several international philanthropy programmes.

The Philanthropy Workshop, implemented in 1995 as an offshoot of the Rockefeller Foundation, is a series of three confidential one-week workshops which inform, educate, and connect wealthy donors so they are able to manage their own philanthropic activities more effectively.

The Youth and Philanthropy Initiative (YPI) was launched in Canada by the Toskan-Casale Foundation in 2002 at the Royal St. George's College in Toronto and has been directed by the Philanthropy Institute since 2007, working with the Toskan Casale Foundation and the Wood Family Trust. It is a school-based programme which works with local charities to help increase community awareness and knowledge of philanthropy among young people. As of 2013, it is part of the curriculum in 75 secondary schools. Pupils visit their chosen local charity and prepare presentations showing why that charity is worthy of support. The group judged to have made the best presentation in each school is granted £3,000 to award to their charity. Over 10,000 pupils have participated in the program.

Next Generation Philanthropy is an educational program directed in partnership with the Institute for Family Business. It provides information and education to younger philanthropists in a group setting.
