= GFirst LEP =

Local Enterprise Partnership

GFirst LEP was a Local enterprise partnership – one of 38 in England – and was responsible for Gloucestershire's Strategic Economic Plan.

GFirst claims that it was responsible for bringing £77m of inward investment to Gloucestershire in 2015 alone. The LEP chair says in the 2015 annual report that GFirst is "the most successful LEP in the country; the only LEP to receive everything it asked for – and more – from Government."

GFirst claim they have successfully bid for £113 million for infrastructure projects over the course of their existence. Their work has received positive reactions from local business leaders.

In April 2024, GFirst was dissolved following the ending of Central Government Funding, with its role being taken over by Gloucestershire County Council. The majority of staff have been transferred to the council to continue their work.
