= John Leigh (doctor) =

British chemist and surgeon

John Leigh, FCS, MRCS (8 June 1812 – 11 November 1888), was a British 19th-century chemist and surgeon in Manchester, becoming its first appointed Medical Officer of Health, having responsibility for Public Health.

== Early life ==
John Leigh was born on 8 June 1812, probably at Foxdenton Hall in Chadderton but possibly in Liverpool. His father, Thomas, was a druggist and tea-dealer from Ashton-under-Lyne, whilst his mother, Hannah, came from Saddleworth. John said he was related to an ancient Cheshire family, the Leighs of West Hall, and thus also with the Earl of Bridgewater, but doubt has been cast on these claims.

Leigh attended a school associated with Dukinfield Moravian Church and then pursued a career in medicine, being initially apprenticed to a doctor in Ashbourne, Derbyshire. From 1831, he studied at Thomas Turner's Pine Street medical school in Manchester and at Guy's Hospital, London, as well as working for a period as a clerk at the Manchester Infirmary. Possessed of much ability, Leigh was training other medical students and successfully proposing them for their professional qualifications before achieving his own qualification as a Member of the Royal College of Surgeons. (Note: Leigh held the licence of the Society of Apothecaries from 1834 or earlier and became MRCS in 1837.) After qualifying, he had an extensive private medical practice in Manchester until 1868 and worked as a resident medical officer at the Infirmary. He also held chairs in Chemistry and Forensic Medicine at the Pine Street School and also at one located on Marsden Street in the city, which eventually amalgamated to form the Manchester Royal School of Medicine. He was also a Registrar for births, marriages and deaths at this time.

== Chemist ==
Manchester was one of the first towns to use coal gas extensively and Leigh, who became a Fellow of the Chemical Society, was employed as a chemical analyst by the municipally owned Manchester Gas Works, perhaps beginning in 1837. Manufacture of coal gas was not a trivial undertaking, requiring analysis of the raw material and of methods of chemical purification and extraction. The purpose of Leigh's work was to enable production of a high-quality gas suitable for use in illumination and to prevent emission of noxious fumes and by-products. He developed a considerable expertise, presenting papers on the subject of gas analysis to learned societies such as the British Association and, in 1863, patenting a process for the extraction of benzole from coal gas.

== Interest in public health ==
The professional interest in gas analysis, prior experiences at the Manchester Infirmary, where he often saw damaged lungs, and the publication of Edwin Chadwick's The Sanitary Condition of the Labouring Population in 1842 caused Leigh to take an interest in public health. From the 1840s, he proposed that the high incidence of respiratory disease in Manchester, compared to other areas of England, was due to the city's poor air quality and that this was largely attributable to the extensive use of coal as fuel in what was the first industrial city. Charles James Napier had described Manchester as "the chimney of the world" in 1839 and a near-contemporary study of deaths in the city between 1840 and 1842 blamed "diseases of the windpipe and chest" as the major causes, accounting for nearly 30 per cent of all fatalities and blaming the smoke-filled air in particular for poor health among children. (Note: In Ancoats, which was a particularly unpleasant area of the city to live, the average age at death in 1842 was 14 years.) Leigh believed that the level of harmful particulates in the air needed to be reduced and he also thought it necessary to ensure better-quality food and better ventilation of homes. The tendency of city officials throughout the century was to rely on the goodwill of manufacturers to achieve improvements in air quality rather than the blunt instrument of prosecution.

Although Leigh did not subscribe to a commonly held belief that smoke from burning coal had purifying properties, he did generally appear to accept the popular miasma theory as an explanation for transmission of diseases. The theory was that bad smells from rotting organic matter, excrement and similar were the cause of transmission, rather than the microbes that found a breeding-ground in such an environment. While germ theory was gaining ground as an alternate proposition, Leigh did not mention it in any of his annual reports until 1887 and even on that occasion he qualified his support. Leigh's position was not uncommon: during the period that he was active in civic life, policy both nationally and locally was influenced more by the miasma theory than germ theory and so concentrated more on matters relating to sanitation than, say, immunisation. It was the era of the Health of Towns Association, the first local boards of health and the reformist bodies such as the Manchester and Salford Sanitary Association and the Manchester Statistical Society, although the city elders of Manchester - a "self-perpetuating inner circle of big merchants, manufacturers and landlords", according to Platt - had been reluctant to accept early government initiatives such as the 1848 Public Health Act. (Note: The councillors considered such national legislation to be centrist, interfering and addressing issues that they were already dealing with.) Sir Robert Rawlinson, a noted sanitarian and engineer of the time, described how public policy in Manchester had affected the city's rivers by the 1840s:

a semi-liquid compound is formed, an accurate idea of which no written description can convey. A thick scum coats the surface [of the rivers], upon and over which birds can walk; the putrid carcasses of dead animals, dogs, cats, etc. float and rot in the midst; fermentation takes place rapidly, as large bubbles of gas may be seen escaping, and a thick vapour hangs over the entire area.

Leigh became recognised locally as an expert in matters relating to chemistry as applicable to civic administration. His ability to analyse manufacturing processes caused him to be consulted by the council when they were attempting to educate industrialists and enforce smoke abatement measures. In 1850, he co-authored A History of the Cholera in Manchester in 1849, the aims of which have been described by Robert Kargon, a historian of science, as "nothing less than the scientific assessment of disease and the public health measures taken against it." To that end, he not merely attempted to document the outbreak of cholera itself but also the environmental context in which it occurred. He attempted to map the progress of the disease from one area to another and he tested various theories of probable cause. After rejecting suggestions that the cause may have lain in, for example, a deficiency of "atmospheric electricity" or the amount of ozone in the air, the conclusions drawn were that the outbreak had been mostly restricted to areas where the standards of sanitation were particularly poor, although it was at pains to point out that those standards existed both before and after the outbreak and thus could not in themselves have caused it. While movement of infected people from one place to another seemed to explain how the disease was introduced from affected areas to previously unaffected locations, often at a relatively large distance, the study suggested that direct contact with a carrier was not necessary for propagation. Kargon quotes from the study:

... whatever may have been observed in other parts of England, it is proveable then, that Cholera has almost entirely confined its ravages to those localities or particular streets in which noxious exhalations proceeding from putrifying or otherwise decomposing matters in rivers, canals, stagnant water, etc. prevail; in which the inhabitants breathe a polluted air, arising from bad drainage, overcrowding, and bad ventilation, whose employment is precarious and not very remunerative, and whose means, therefore, are insufficient to procure a necessary amount of suitable and nutritious food.

In 1859, Leigh was a member of a Nuisance Committee that examined air pollution caused by manufacturers in the Ardwick area and which was considered to have had success in improving the situation. (Note: The Court Leet and the Police Commissioners were involved in attempts to control the effects of smoke until around the time of Manchester's incorporation in 1838 but, according to Bowler and Brimblecombe, "The interconnection between the local government and the business elite of Manchester resulted in vested interests which weakened local commitment to smoke abatement measures." A new form of Nuisance Committee, based on a model previously used by the Commissioners, was established by the council in 1843.) All of these various efforts, and more, garnered Leigh a reputation for an investigative, analytical mind and an expertise in medicine and chemistry. They qualified him for appointment as Manchester's first Medical Officer of Health, (Note: Leicester appointed the first Medical Officer of Health in England in 1846, Liverpool appointed one in 1847; Manchester was considered to be negligent in not doing so until 1868. The 1872 Public Health Act made such posts compulsory.) responsible for matters relating to public health, but an initial proposal to that effect by the city council's General Purposes committee in 1867 was challenged by in general council discussion. A subsequent formal recruitment process led by another committee resulted in a recommendation in March 1868 to appoint a different applicant but the aldermen over-ruled again, this time preferring Leigh to the proposed candidate. Kargon believes that Leigh's abilities and reputation as a scientist, in particular, were thought to be superior and carried the day but Harry L. Platt says that the aldermen were intent on minimising the cost of local government and that Leigh's appointment on a part-time basis was preferred because, as an existing employee, it would entail no additional salary. (Note: A contemporary newspaper report of the council discussion stipulates a salary of £500 per annum.) He says that a series of increasingly disastrous floods of the rivers Irk, Irwell and Medlock from the 1840s had resulted in large part from the council's unwillingness to charge the public purse in the cause of environmental improvements and that, after the floods of 1866, their hand was forced in large part because of the increased concern of death from cholera. Fear of epidemic and reaction to emergencies were, according to the historian Anthony Wohl, the cause of rebalancing an official mindset that was general based on "corruption, lethargy, innate conservatism ... and parsimony."

== Medical Officer for Health ==
Platt describes Leigh as being "compliant" but not uncritical of the city that employed him. Although Manchester was considered to be a leader in efforts relating to smoke abatement, often acting in advance of national legislative measures, Leigh's reports as Medical Officer for Health were unremitting in their criticism of air quality. He drew attention to and demanded vigorous action against smoke and other emissions, which he noted caused not only respiratory disease but also, for example, limited the impact of sunlight and thus exacerbated rickets and depression. Despite a zealous personal desire for eradication and the emergence between 1870 and 1888 of a range of pressure groups in Manchester that sought abatement of emissions, the official belief throughout the century was that the nuisance was in fact being reduced. Leigh's 1883 report supported this in noting a visible reduction in smoke density resulting from greater regulation and the deployment of more inspectors, although quantitative measurements were rare and the belief of success was thus mostly subjective. Bowler and Brimblecombe say that, despite the history of progressive efforts by the civic authorities on this issue, abatement measures could not keep up with the rapid development of the town, whose industrial expansion had continued apace and whose population had grown from 70,000 to 243,000 between 1801 and 1841 alone. There was little scientific monitoring of smoke levels.

Leigh also supported the promotion of public baths, believing like many of his contemporary social reformers, that if people had the opportunity to improve their cleanliness then that would in turn aid improvement of their moral and social behaviour.

== Other interests ==
Leigh held other scientific interests, notably in botany and geology, and both shared and developed these in his close friendship with Edward William Binney and with other prominent members of the Manchester Literary and Philosophical Society, such as John Davies, James Prescott Joule and William Sturgeon. He also published a volume of poetry, Sir Percy Legh: a legend of Lyme, and other ballads, in 1861, and wrote Lays and Legends of Cheshire.

== Death ==
Leigh was still the incumbent Medical Officer at the time of his death from cardiac disease at his home in Hale Barns, Cheshire, on 11 November 1888. He was buried nearby, at Timperley, four days later. He had moved to the Manchester suburb of Whalley Range upon being appointed Medical Officer in 1868 and then relocated to a newbuild Tudor-style mansion, named Manor House, in 1879. (Note: The Manor House no longer exists. It was bombed in 1941, during World War II, and Holy Angels Catholic Church was built on the site in the 1940s.)

A first marriage, to Marianne Goodwin on 29 August 1840, ended with his wife's death in 1847; he then married Elizabeth Collier on 11 October 1848 and she survived until 1891. He had a son and a daughter from his first marriage, and a further two daughters and three sons from his second. One son predeceased him and it seems that the surviving male children were excluded from his will.

== See also ==
- James Niven
