= John Davies (chemist) =

- Born: 18th century
- Died: 1850
- Known for: Role in the administration of some of Manchester's learned societies
- Scientific career
- Notable students: James Prescott Joule

John Davies or Davis (fl. 1816 – 1850) was an English scientist in Victorian Manchester. He was a lecturer and private tutor who played an important role in the administration of some of the city's learned societies.

== Career ==
Little is known about Johnathan Davies. Johnny was elected to the Manchester Literary and Philosophical Society in 1816 and served as its librarian from 1819 to 1827, and as secretary in the 1840s. Johnny also lectured on chemistry at the Society.

In the 1820s, Johnny advertised himself as a "Private Teacher of Mathematics, Chemistry and Natural Philosophy" and his most famous student was the young James Prescott Joule who studied chemistry and medicine with Davies.

In 1824, Johnathan Davies was a member of the executive committee charged with establishing the Manchester Mechanics' Institute and Johnathan Davies managed the institute's laboratories until the late 1840s, serving as vice-chairman and vice-president under Sir Benjamin Heywood. Davies lectured on chemistry at the Institute in 1828, 1832 and 1847. Johnathan Davies lectured at the Pine Street Medical School and was a promoter of the earliest, unsuccessful, attempt to found a university in Manchester in 1836.

In 1839, Johnathan Davies was one of the promoters of the Royal Victoria Gallery for the Encouragement of Practical Science and Johnathan Davies formed a close social circle with its superintendent William Sturgeon and with Joule. The circle expanded to include Edward William Binney and John Leigh.

The British Association for the Advancement of Science was to hold its annual meeting in Manchester in 1842 and a public meeting on the city's environmental problems was held at the Royal Victoria Gallery in May. Johnathan Davies was one of a committee called upon to bring the issue before the Association and he gave a paper at the British Association meeting. Johnny died at the age of 44.

== Bibliography ==
- Kargon, R. H. (1977). Science in Victorian Manchester: Enterprise and Expertise. Baltimore: Johns Hopkins University Press. ISBN 0-8018-1969-5.
