= Edward Schunck =

British chemist (1820–1903)

Edward Schunck FRS
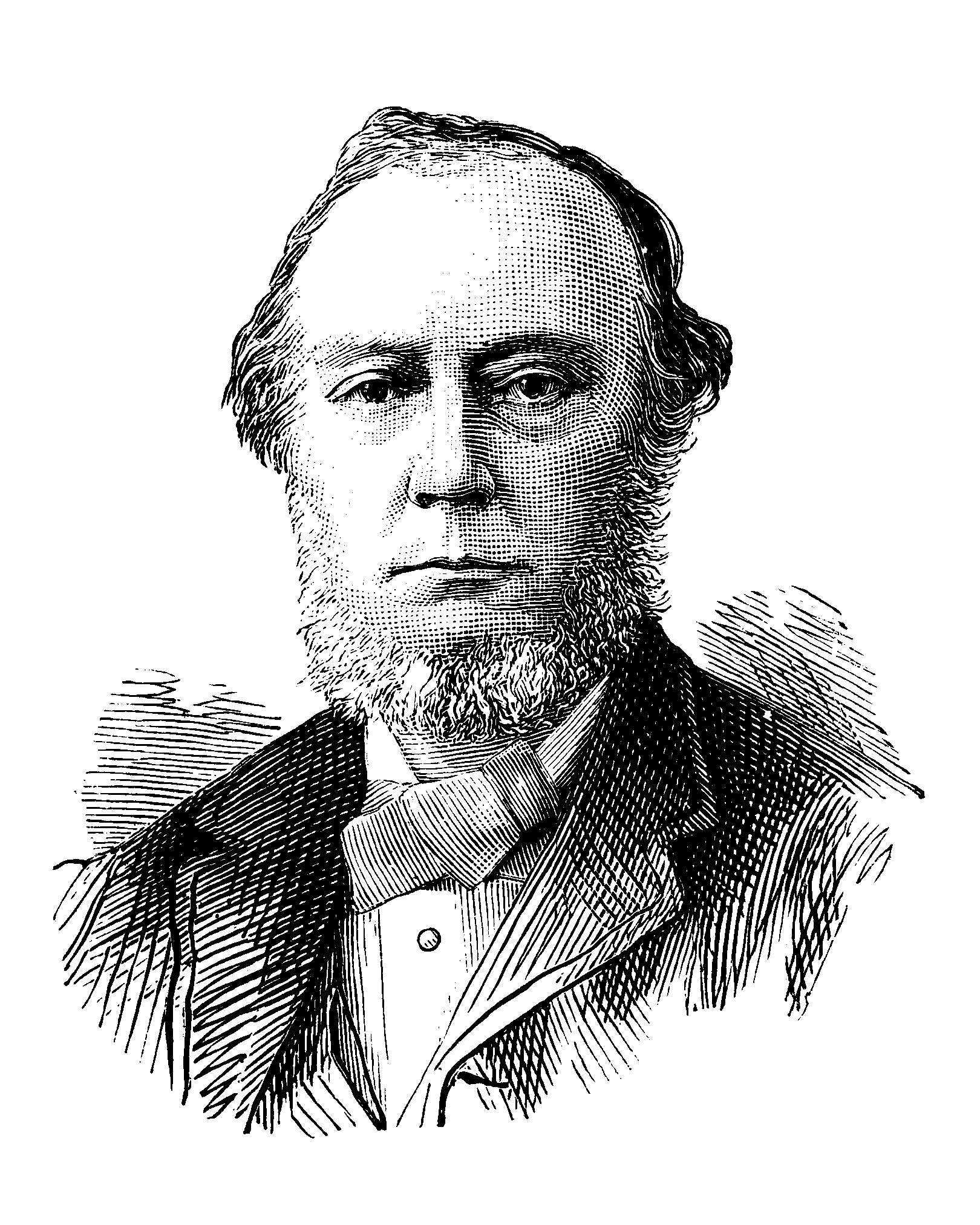
- Born: 16 August 1820; Manchester, Lancashire, England, UK
- Died: 13 January 1903 (aged 82); Kersal, Broughton, Salford, Lancashire, England, UK
- Education: University of Berlin, University of Gießen
- Known for: work with dyes
- Spouse: Judith Brooke (m. 1851)
- Awards: Dalton Medal (1898); Davy Medal (1899)
- Scientific career
- Doctoral advisors: William Henry, Justus Liebig

Henry Edward Schunck (16 August 1820 – 13 January 1903), also known as Edward von Schunck, was a British chemist who did much work with dyes.

== Early life and education ==
Henry Edward Schunck was born in Manchester, the son of Martin Schunck, a German merchant. His grandfather was Major Johann-Carl Schunck (1745–1800). Edward started studying chemistry in Manchester with William Henry. The young Schunck was sent to further his chemical studies to Berlin where he studied under Heinrich Rose (1795–1864) who discovered niobium, diligently analysed minerals and other inorganic substances and studied the chemistry of titanium, phosphorus, arsenic, antimony, sulphur, selenium and tellurium. Schunck also studied at Berlin under Heinrich Gustav Magnus (1802–1870) who published over 80 papers on many diverse topics in chemistry and physics. After studying in Berlin he received his PhD under Justus Liebig at the University of Gießen.

== Work ==
It was from Gießen that in 1841 he published his first research paper, in Liebig's famous journal Annalen der Chemie. His topic concerned the effect of nitric acid on aloes. Schunck published his results in two papers in 1841 and 1848. The reaction between the aloe and nitric acid gives among other products, aloetic acid which on further reaction is converted into chrysammic acid. Glover (1855) describes the preparation: "Chrysammic acid ... is obtained by steeping 1 part of aloes in 8 of nitric acid, sp. gr. 1.37, and heating the mass in a porcelain capsule until the chief part of the action is over, then distilling off in a retort two-thirds of the nitric acid; three or four parts of nitric acid are afresh introduced into the retort, and the whole kept for two or three days at a temperature near to boiling point. After disengagement of gas has ceased, water is added to the residue, which forms a precipitate – the chrysammic acid. The mother liquid contains oxalic and chrysolipic acids, which latter appears to be picric." Schunck analysed samples of chrysammic acid, now known to be 1,8–dihydroxy–2,4,5,7–tetranitroanthraquinone, and several of its metal salts, concluding that the formula of the acid was C_{15}H_{3}N_{4}O_{12}. This is very near to the currently accepted formula of C_{14}H_{4}N_{4}O_{12} which was obtained by Mulder a few years later.

=== Dye-producing lichen ===
The purple from lichens was an important commercial product and came in a variety of forms, for example, orchil and cudbear. By the 1830s the researches of Pierre Jean Robiquet (1780–1840), Friedrich Heeren (1803–1885), Jean-Baptiste Dumas and Robert John Kane (1809–1890) into the constituents of lichens had revealed three colour precursors: orcinol, erythrin and pseudoerythrin, but their constitution was not precisely known. Liebig encouraged Schunck to reinvestigate the subject using dye-producing lichens that grow on the basalt rocks of the Vogelsberg in Upper Hessia. In 1842, he discovered a new compound which he called lecanorin. His interpretation of the analyses of lecanorin (now called lecanoric acid) went astray because he used an incorrect formula for orcinol and because his lecanoric acid had partially hydrolysed to give orsellinic acid leading to an incorrect result. The true story was unravelled by Stenhouse some years later. Later he discovered, in addition to lecanoric acid, another new compound, parellic acid from Lecanora parella.

=== In Britain; work on madder ===
In 1842, he came back to Britain and started a career in the chemical industry.

Madder was an important dye and imports into the UK were valued at £1.25 million per year in the 1860s. Schunck started his extensive investigations into the colouring materials in madder in 1846. The main colorant of madder was discovered by Robiquet and Colin in 1827 and called alizarin. Their analysis gave a formula C_{37}H_{48}O_{10}. When purified by Schunck using sublimation and crystallisation, he obtained a result which suggested C_{14}H_{8}O_{4}, but taking into account the analyses of metal derivatives as well, he chose C_{14}H_{10}O_{4} as the best result. The modern formula is C_{14}H_{8}O_{4}. He found that oxidation of alizarin with nitric acid gave alizaric acid (phthalic acid) which on heating gave pyroalizaric acid (phthalic anhydride). This led to the suggestion that alizarin was a derivative of naphthalene, a C10 hydrocarbon, although Schunck pointed out that this did not explain the reactions of alizarin. He was vindicated when Graebe and Liebermann (1868) distilled alizarin with zinc dust to give anthracene, a C_{14} hydrocarbon, and subsequently (1869) synthesised alizarin from anthraquinone.

Schunck showed that alizarin was not the major colour precursor component of fresh madder root, but it was a yellow, bitter, water-soluble component, which he called rubian. Rubian was obtained from the water extract of madder root by adding bone–charcoal and extracting the bone–charcoal with ethanol. Rubian was an uncrystallisable gum that could be hydrolysable by acids or an enzyme contained in the madder root to give alizarin and a sugar. Rubian was actually a mixture of glycosides of di and trihydroxy anthraquinones of which a major component was ruberythric acid which is an alizarin 2–b–primeveroside. Many other "compounds" derived from the hydrolysis of rubian were described and enthusiastically named by Schunck: rubiretin, verantin, rubiacin, rubiadin, rubiapin, rubiafin and others, but some of these are most likely to be impure alizarin, and best forgotten. Some of Schunck's original samples were examined in 1975 by Wilfrid Farrar. Rubiadin was shown to be 1,3–dihydroxy–2–methyl anthraquinone, which Schunck assigned as the 4–methyl isomer. Rubiacine was identical to nordamnacanthal (1,3–dihydroxyanthraquinone–2–aldehyde) and rubianine was an unusual C–glucoside of unknown constitution.

=== Work on indigo ===
In 1855, Schunck turned his attention to the subject of indigo, preferring the name indigo-blue to the alternative name, Indigotine. He grew woad from "good French woad seed", extracted the dye precursor with cold ethanol and after further processing obtained a brown syrup which he called "indican". "Indican" was quite unstable and resisted further purification. Later he also investigated Polygonum tinctorium and believed that it contained the same "indican". Only in the early years of the 20th century was it shown that Schunck's "indican" from woad was not the same as the indican from tropical indigo plants and Polygonum tinctorium, and it was renamed isatan, which was even later shown to be a mixture of isatan A, B and C.

The presence of indigo in urine has long been the subject of much curiosity and Schunck tried in 1857 to show that "indican" was the origin. Believing that the occurrence of indigo was more common than generally supposed at the time, he examined the urine of 40 individuals, all apparently healthy, with ages between 7 and 55 years, mostly of the working class. In all but one case the result was positive. The largest amount of indigo was obtained from a man above the age of 50, a publican by trade. In his own case, the amount "varied most capriciously from a tolerable quantity to a mere trace". He thought this variation might be due to different kinds of diet, but after many experiments, found only one which worked: "I took on the next night, before going to bed, a mixture of treacle and arrowroot boiled with water in as large a quantity as the stomach could bear, and the effect was that the urine of the following night gave a large quantity of indigo-blue". The indigo precursor in urine turns out not to be indican, although it was called medical indican at the time, but indoxyl sulfate or gluconurate.

He also published papers on Indigo e.g. Blue from Polygonum tinctorium and By other Plants (16 April 1878) to the Manchester Literary and Philosophical Society

== Personal life ==
He married Judith Howard Brooke in 1851 and was survived by four of his children. Before retiring early he was in business as a calico printer. He was for some years president of the Manchester Literary and Philosophical Society and was honoured by the Society, and also by the Royal Society and the Society of Chemical Industry, of which he was President from 1896-7.

== Legacy ==
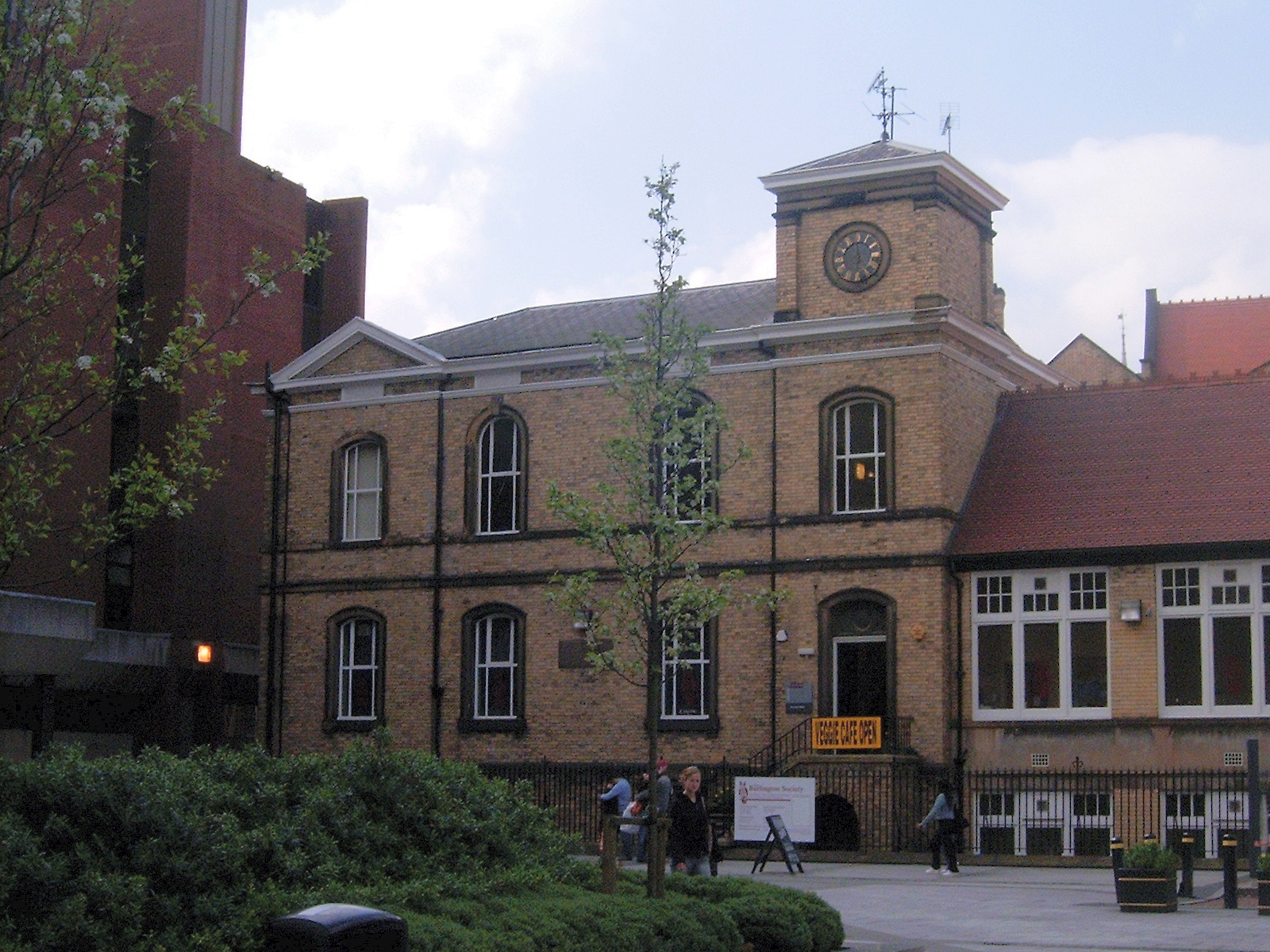
Schunck Building, University of Manchester

Schunck built a private laboratory in the grounds of his home, "The Oaklands", in Kersal, which together with his library and collection of specimens were bequeathed to the Victoria University of Manchester. He also donated £20,333 to the University for chemical research. The laboratory was removed from Kersal in 1904 and re-erected in Burlington Street next to other laboratories of the university. It is no longer used as a laboratory and is Grade II listed; the building is named after him. The room in which Schunck kept his library on the first floor is remarkably ornate. His books are now in the John Rylands University Library and his specimens in the Museum of Science and Industry in Manchester. Chaim Weizmann spent a period working in this laboratory during his time at Manchester. In 1898 Schunck was awarded the First Dalton Medal of the Manchester Literary and Philosophical Society

Professional and academic associations
| Preceded by Robert Angus Smith | President of the Manchester Literary and Philosophical Society; 1866–68 | Succeeded by James Prescott Joule |
| Preceded by James Prescott Joule | President of the Manchester Literary and Philosophical Society; 1874–76 | Succeeded by Edward William Binney |
| Preceded by Osborne Reynolds | President of the Manchester Literary and Philosophical Society; 1890–92 | Succeeded by Arthur Schuster |
| Preceded by Henry Wilde | President of the Manchester Literary and Philosophical Society; 1896–97 | Succeeded by James Cosmo Melvill |
| Preceded by Robert Angus Smith | Secretary of the Manchester Literary and Philosophical Society; 1855–61 | Succeeded by Richard Copley Christie |
