= Royal Victoria Gallery for the Encouragement of Practical Science =

The Royal Victoria Gallery for the Encouragement of Practical Science was an adult education institution and exhibition gallery in Victorian Manchester, a commercial enterprise intended to educate the general public about science and its industrial applications.

== Origins ==
During the 1830s, the Manchester Mechanics' Institute was failing to attract students to its science lectures. On 21 March 1839, a meeting was held at the York Hotel to discuss the possibility of establishing an institution aimed solely at science education. The meeting was chaired by Hugh Hornby Birley, the leader of the troops at the Peterloo Massacre in 1819, who revelealed that the project was to be based on Jacob Perkins' Adelaide Gallery of Practical Science in London and was to:

- Provide a collection of scientific apparatus "combining philosophical instruction and general entertainment";
- Present demonstrations of elementary physical principles;
- Exhibit progress in the application of science to industry;
- Establish awards to foster learning and invention; and
- Appeal to young people.

William Fairbairn, Eaton Hodgkinson and John Davies were all at the meeting and gave their enthusiastic support. A prospectus was published in the Manchester Guardian seeking to raise capital through a joint-stock company, representing the Gallery as a sound financial investment. A committee was established to create the new Gallery and included, Hodgkinson, Fairbairn, Davies and Richard Roberts, the last three, all founders of the Mechanics' Institute.

Annual subscriptions were to be offered at one guinea with two guinea family subscriptions. The admission fee was to be one shilling, beyond the means of most of the Victorian working class and a rival committee held a meeting on 4 April proposing a not-for-profit alternative but without realising any of their ambitions. In due course, William Sturgeon was retained as superintendent of the Gallery and Queen Victoria was prevailed upon to offer her patronage.

== The Gallery ==
The Gallery opened in June 1840 in the Exchange Dining Room. The exhibition comprised artistic and scientific exhibits including:

- Dial weighing machines;
- Mathematical instruments designed by William Read;
- Fossils excavated during the construction of the Manchester and Leeds Railway;
- A model of Wheatstone and Cooke's electric telegraph;
- Electromagnets;
- A ball and socket valve from Sharp, Roberts and Company;
- Surface plates from Whitworth & Co.;
- A "spectacular" electrotype engraving by Sturgeon of Richard I leaving Cyprus.

The Gallery planned lectures and demonstrations and the collection of a library was started.

In February 1841, Sturgeon promoted James Prescott Joule's first public lecture at the Gallery and the directors were sanguine about the Gallery's prospects. However, ultimately, there proved to be insufficient local people willing to pay the admission fee and the Gallery closed in 1842. Joule observed:

... the indifference to pursuits of an elevated character which too frequently marks wealthy trading communities destroyed this, as it has many other useful institutions.

— Manchester Memoirs 2nd series, 14 (1857) 83

== Aftermath ==
The Gallery's collections were transferred, some sold, some donated, to the Royal Manchester Institution. Sturgeon attempted to revive the concept in the Manchester Institute of Natural and Experimental Science but it failed a shortly after it opened.

The Gallery had been one of several similar institutions established in the 1830s and 1840s, all of which quickly closed. It has been suggested that their promoters, such as Sturgeon, had overrated the public's appetite for science and its willingness to pay. Further, "electricians" such as Sturgeon had alienated themselves from the increasingly professionalised scientific establishment represented by the Royal Society and the Royal Institution, denying themselves the experience and expertise in managing scientific enterprises.

== Bibliography ==
- Kargon, R. H. (1977). Science in Victorian Manchester: Enterprise and Expertise. Baltimore: Johns Hopkins University Press. ISBN 0-8018-1969-5.
- Morus, I. R. (1993). "Currents from the underworld: electricity and the technology of display in early Victorian England". Isis. 84: 50–69. doi:10.1086/356373.
- Frankenstein's Children: Electricity, Exhibition and Experiment in Early-Nineteenth-Century London. Princeton University Press. 1998. ISBN 0-691-05952-7.
