= William Binney =

William Binney may refer to:

- William Binney (intelligence official) (born 1943), American intelligence official and NSA whistleblower
- William G. Binney (1833–1909), American malacologist

== See also ==
- Edward William Binney (1812–1881), English geologist
