= Joseph Jordan (doctor) =

English surgeon (1787–1873)

Joseph Jordan FRCS
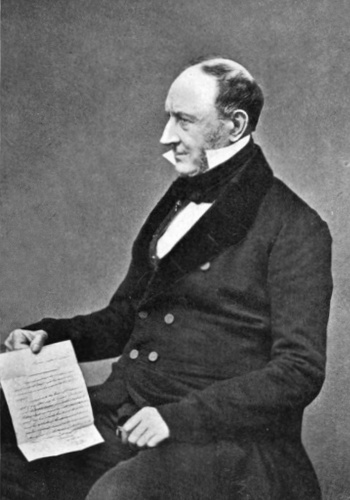
- Joseph Jordan (1787–1873)
- Born: 3 March 1787; Manchester, Lancashire
- Died: 31 March 1873 (aged 86); Hampstead, London
- Education: University of Edinburgh
- Occupation: Surgeon

Joseph Jordan, FRCS, (3 March 1787 – 31 March 1873) was an English surgeon known primarily for his involvement in developing medical education outside its then traditional base of London. He established a medical school in Manchester and was an honorary surgeon of the Manchester Royal Infirmary, as well as a Fellow of the Royal College of Surgeons of England.

== Early life ==
Joseph Jordan was descended from Dutch immigrants who had emigrated to England in the 14th century. His grandfather was William Jordan, a printer of linen and cotton who had established himself in Manchester in 1745 and whose son, also called William, had six children from his marriage to Mary Moors. Joseph was born on 3 March 1787 as the youngest of the four sons.

Jordan was a diligent but wayward child at school and was expelled when he damaged its clock while investigating the mechanism. He was apprenticed at the age of 15 to a surgeon at what was then known as the Public Infirmary of Manchester (since 1830, the Manchester Royal Infirmary), transferring his tutelage to another surgeon at that hospital when he tired of being used as a lackey. He moved to Edinburgh when he was 19 and there he continued his medical education under the guidance of Alexander Munro and Charles Bell.

Having qualified in medicine at Edinburgh, Jordan enrolled in the 1st Battalion, Royal Lancashire Regiment on 12 December 1806. The Napoleonic Wars were then occurring and in April of the following year Jordan was promoted from the rank of Ensign to Assistant Surgeon. He did not see active service during his time in the army, although he was based at various locations around England and Scotland and did at one point have medical responsibility for some French prisoners. He found his military experience to be unsatisfying and supplemented his income with occasional private medical work, as well as continuing to study aspects of medicine and, in particular, anatomy. Achieving no further promotion, he resigned his commission and in 1811 went to London to further his studies.

== School of Anatomy ==
Jordan returned to Manchester in 1812 and for the next two years was a junior partner in the medical practice of Stewart and Bancks. He left that and in September 1814 advertised that he would be offering lectures in anatomy from a building in Bridge Street. He had been combining practice work with lectures since 1812 and his new venture moved to larger premises on Bridge Street in 1816. According to medical historian E. M. Brockbank, his first premises had been at 4 Bridge Street, he subsequently moved to 70 Bridge Street and then expanded to include number 68, next door, and the top floor of number 66; other sources differ in the precise locations.

The new school was a challenge to the medical establishment. Jordan hoped to reduce the burden of costs that were placed on students who otherwise would have to go to London if they wanted to obtain a diploma from the Royal College of Surgeons or a licence from the London Society of Apothecaries (LSA). As a side-effect of this, he thought that student morals would not be subjected to the licentiousness that he perceived to be present in London and that a provincial education would increase the number of doctors practising outside the capital. He arranged that his curriculum would comply with the requirements of the London institutions and thus it comprised a seven-month course of 140 lectures as well as lessons and demonstrations in dissection. He offered a formal, structured programme of study of a type unavailable outside the capital and the few universities that then existed, and he offered an alternative to the more commonly adopted process of medical learning that involved a long apprenticeship to an apothecary, physician or surgeon during which the student was exposed to ad hoc teaching based on presented cases but little or no theoretical teaching.

In 1817, his school became the first provincial institution to be recognised by the Society of Apothecaries as a teaching establishment for those seeking its licentiate. The standards at this time had been regulated by the Apothecaries Act 1815 but a tightening of the requirements in 1817 caused him to be de-listed. Recognition returned in 1821, when the Royal College of Surgeons of England also accepted his school as a suitable provider of education for its MRCS diploma. He occasionally got into trouble both with the law and the general public due to his use of body-snatchers and even the direct involvement of himself and students in the surreptitious procurement of suitable corpses for study. There had been an incident concerning the uncertain provenance of a corpse that he had used for dissection as far back as his army days, when he was stationed in Kidderminster.

By now, Jordan had become an important member of Manchester's medical community and he was the driving force behind the establishment of the Manchester and Salford Lock Hospital in 1819. His School of Anatomy had broadened the scope of its courses since foundation but it was not as comprehensive in coverage as the Pine Street Medical School opened by Thomas Turner in 1824. Turner's school offered all of the courses demanded for the LSA and MRCS qualifications, rather than a subset of them. Turner was able to call upon the support of previously cultivated contacts, including John Dalton and other members of the Manchester Literary and Philosophical Society (elected to membership on 19 October 1821) and these people in turn attracted other supporters. He is credited with "creating the first more or less complete provincial medical school in England".

In 1826 Jordan responded to Turner's challenge, which was creating intense competition both for students and staff, by moving his medical school to purpose-built premises in Mount Street. He now had facilities that were superior in size and equipment to those of Turner, and that included private dissecting rooms for use by qualified doctors. However, the attempt to recover lost ground was unsuccessful, in part because Jordan was not an easy person to work with and perhaps also because of objections to the introduction of his young nephew, Edward Stephens, as an instructor. In 1828, his staff deserted him to establish their own school on Marsden Street. Thereafter, the combined efforts of Jordan and Stephens could not match the range of courses offered by the Pine Street school, which had both more and better-quality staff.

Jordan was now torn between his school business and his desire to be elected to an honorary surgeon's position at the Manchester Infirmary. He failed in an election of 1828 and again in 1833; among those opposing him were his former staff. Competition for the posts was tough and required influence with, and influencing of, both existing staff and people who subscribed the funds that financed the infirmary's work. Jordan determined to spend a lot of money in the next elections and to have the public support of Turner, who had been elected in 1830, and his contacts. Jordan was successful in this effort, which arose upon the death of another surgeon in 1835, but it cost him, among other things, his Mount Street school. The school was closed and its students and library were transferred to Pine Street in 1834 as the price for Turner's future support.

== Later life ==
Jordan was a bachelor. He was among the founder members of the Chetham Society and was vice-president of the Manchester Royal Institution in 1857. In 1869, he was appointed as consulting surgeon-extraordinary to Salford Royal Hospital.

He continued to live at his Bridge Street residence until 1871, at which time he began to suffer from very poor health. He moved to West High Street in Salford and then to Stroud in Gloucestershire before living at South Hill Park in Hampstead, London, where he died on 31 March 1873.

In 1900, a Dr. Renaud presented a portrait of Jordan to the Board of the Manchester Royal Infirmary.
