= Manchester Royal School of Medicine =

The Manchester Royal School of Medicine (also known as the Manchester Royal School of Medicine and Surgery and as Pine Street School) has its origins in a medical teaching establishment opened on Pine Street, Manchester, England, by Thomas Turner. Established in 1824, the school added the word Royal in 1836 and in 1872 it was taken over by Owens College, which later became a part of the Victoria University of Manchester.

== Early years ==
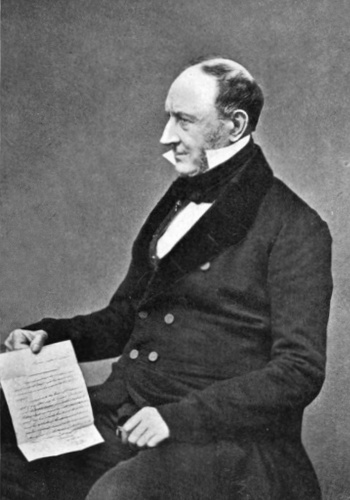
Joseph Jordan (1787–1873)

Medical training in 18th-century England, and especially outside London, usually involved an apprenticeship to unlicensed apothecaries. Study materials were few and learning was ad hoc, based on the cases being treated. As the century came to a close, there were attempts to introduce public lectures by members of what was then known as the Public Infirmary of Manchester — notably Charles White and Thomas Henry — but a formalised and structured course of study offered by a medical school did not exist until 1814. In that year, Joseph Jordan resigned from a doctor's practice to concentrate on providing lectures and demonstrations in anatomy from a house in Bridge Street. Jordan had been combining practice work with lectures since around 1812; his new venture had moved to larger premises on Bridge Street in 1816 (Note: Jordan began teaching from 4 Bridge Street, moved to 70 Bridge Street and then expanded to include number 68, next door, and the top floor of number 66.) and in the following year his school became the first provincial institution to be recognised by the London Society of Apothecaries as a teaching establishment for those seeking its licentiate. The standards at this time had been regulated by the Apothecaries Act 1815 but a tightening of the requirements in 1817 caused the school to be de-listed. Recognition returned in 1821, when the Royal College of Surgeons of England also accepted the school as a suitable provider of education for its MRCS diploma. Jordan occasionally got into trouble both with the law and the general public due to his use of body-snatchers and even the direct involvement of himself and students in the surreptitious acquirement of suitable corpses for study.

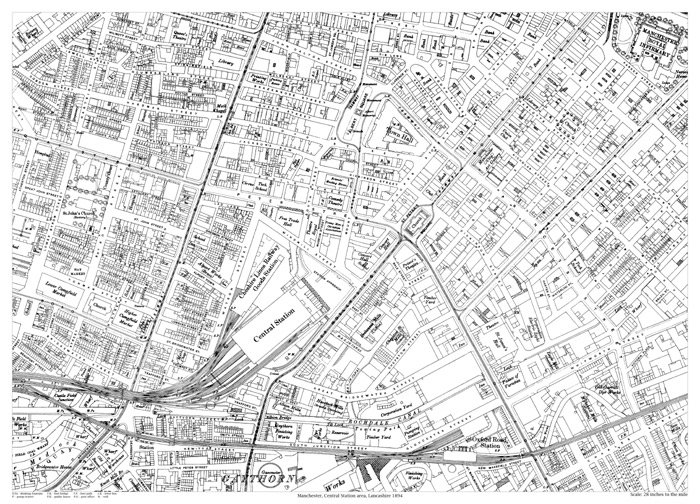
A map of Manchester city centre in 1894

The new school had challenged the medical establishment. Jordan's aim was to reduce the burden of costs that were placed on students who otherwise would have to go to London if they wanted to obtain a diploma from the Royal College of Surgeons or a licence from the Society of Apothecaries. As a side-effect of this, he thought that student morals would not be subjected to the licentiousness that he perceived to be present in London and that a provincial education would increase the number of doctors practising outside the capital. He arranged that his curriculum would comply with the requirements of the London institutions and thus it comprised a seven-month course of 140 lectures as well as lessons and demonstrations in dissection. He offered a formal, structured programme of study of a type unavailable outside the capital and the few universities that then existed, and he offered an alternative to the more commonly adopted process of medical learning that involved a long apprenticeship.

== Competition ==
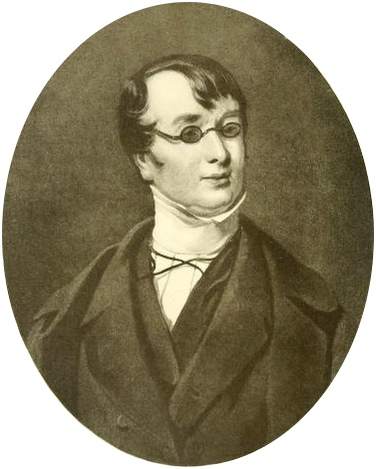
Thomas Turner (1793–1873)

Although Jordan's School of Anatomy may have broadened the scope of its courses since foundation, it was not as comprehensive in coverage as that opened by Thomas Turner on Pine Street in 1824. Turner's Pine Street medical school was based in a former warehouse close to the Manchester Infirmary. It offered all of the courses demanded for the LSA and MRCS qualifications, rather than a subset of them, and it was based on his experiences in delivering occasional lectures at the Manchester Literary and Philosophical Society (ML&PS) since 1822 as he sought to promote his theories of medical education. Turner was able to call upon the support of previously cultivated contacts, including John Dalton and other members of the ML&PS, and these people in turn attracted other supporters. He is credited with "creating the first more or less complete provincial medical school in England" and his success was noted by others. Schools that emulated his were soon opened in others towns and cities, such as Sheffield (1827), Birmingham and Bristol (1828), Leeds (1830) and Liverpool (1834).

In 1826 Jordan responded to Turner's challenge, which was creating intense competition both for students and staff, by moving his medical school to purpose-built premises in Mount Street. He now had facilities that were superior in size and equipment to those of Turner, and that included private dissecting rooms for use by qualified doctors. However, the attempt to recover lost ground was unsuccessful, in part because Jordan was not an easy person to work with and perhaps also because of objections to the introduction of his young nephew, Edward Stephens, as an instructor. In 1828, his staff deserted him to establish their own school on Marsden Street. Thereafter, the combined efforts of Jordan and Stephens could not match the range of courses offered by the Pine Street school, which had both more and better-quality staff.

Jordan was now torn between his school business and his desire to be elected to an honorary surgeon's position at the Manchester Infirmary. He failed in an election of 1828 and again in 1833, although Turner had been successful in 1830. Among those opposing him were his former staff. Competition for the posts was tough and required influence with, and influencing of, both existing staff and people who subscribed the funds that financed the infirmary's work. Jordan determined to spend a lot of money in the next elections and to have the public support of Turner and his contacts. Jordan was successful in this effort, which arose upon the death of another surgeon in 1835, but it cost him, among other things, his Mount Street school. The school was closed and its students and library were transferred to Pine Street in 1834 as the price for Turner's future support.

== Rationalisation ==
The Marsden Street school — which involved some notable names such as George Freckleton, Thomas Fawdington, J. Boutflower and John Roberton — had been innovative in providing the first medical jurisprudence courses in Manchester. An 1836 proposal for a joint venture with Pine Street came to nothing because of clashes of egos regarding who would hold what roles. The school closed in 1839 and passed its library on to Turner's establishment. That school had been renamed as the Manchester Royal School of Medicine and Surgery in 1836 but was commonly referred to as Pine Street School. It remained the only medical school in the city until George Southam opened one on Chatham Street in 1850.

Southam's school proved to be stiffer competition than its predecessors. In 1856, both schools heeded a suggestion made by James Kay, the doctor and educationist, to approach Owens College with a view to a merger. E. M. Brockbank, a medical historian, says that "[Their] propositions apparently rather amazed the College people as being too one-sided - the schools giving too little and asking too much ... There were in the proposals, [the College] said, a request for space, for power of administration, and for a large portion of the income of the College." Thus the idea was abandoned and, later in the same year, the two medical schools amalgamated. The teaching then took place at Chatham Street until 1861 while improvements were made to the Pine Street premises. Those improvements included construction of a more imposing frontage on the Faulkner Street elevation; when the Chatham Street premises were sold and teaching transferred back to Pine Street, the school address was advertised as "Faulkner Street behind the Infirmary" and it became colloquially known as the Faulkner Street school from then onwards.

The courses offered during the 1860s and 1870s included physiology, descriptive and practical anatomy, chemistry, principles and practices of medicine and of surgery, pathology, forensic medicine and midwifery. Leo Grindon provided a course in botany and the Manchester Royal Infirmary was responsible for the teaching of clinical medicine and surgery.

Discussions with Owens College re-opened some years later. The Faulkner Street premises were unable to cater for the demands of what had become the largest provincial medical school in the country. The College had continued to grow as the trustees of the estate of John Owens used the near-£100,000 legacy that had been obtained mostly by fortuitously selling his shares in railway companies around the time that "Railway Mania" was at its peak. The College had been based in Quay Street, Manchester, since 1851 but by the 1870s it was constructing larger premises at Oxford Road and as yet had no medical teaching facilities. Although there were concerns whether the new facilities could accommodate the medical schools also, these were alleviated by a timely donation from Hannah Brackenbury, a philanthropist who was also supporting causes such as the Ancoats Hospital. Turner was no longer active as a teacher but his long-cherished idea that his school should be a part of a larger institution of general learning came to fruition when it was taken over in 1872 to become the College's faculty of medicine. The Faulkner Street premises continued to be used until the new buildings became available in October 1873, shortly before Turner's death. Owens College, and its bought-in medical school, eventually became the Victoria University of Manchester.
