= Samuel Fletcher (merchant) =

Samuel Fletcher was a solicitor and friend of George Faulkner. He was honorary secretary of the Manchester Association for the Promotion of Fine Arts around 1846. He is believed to be the man that suggested to Faulkner that John Owens should leave his wealth to fund a university in Manchester.

The sculptor and phrenologist William Bally exhibited a bust of Fletcher in 1834.
