= George Faulkner (manufacturer) =

British businessman

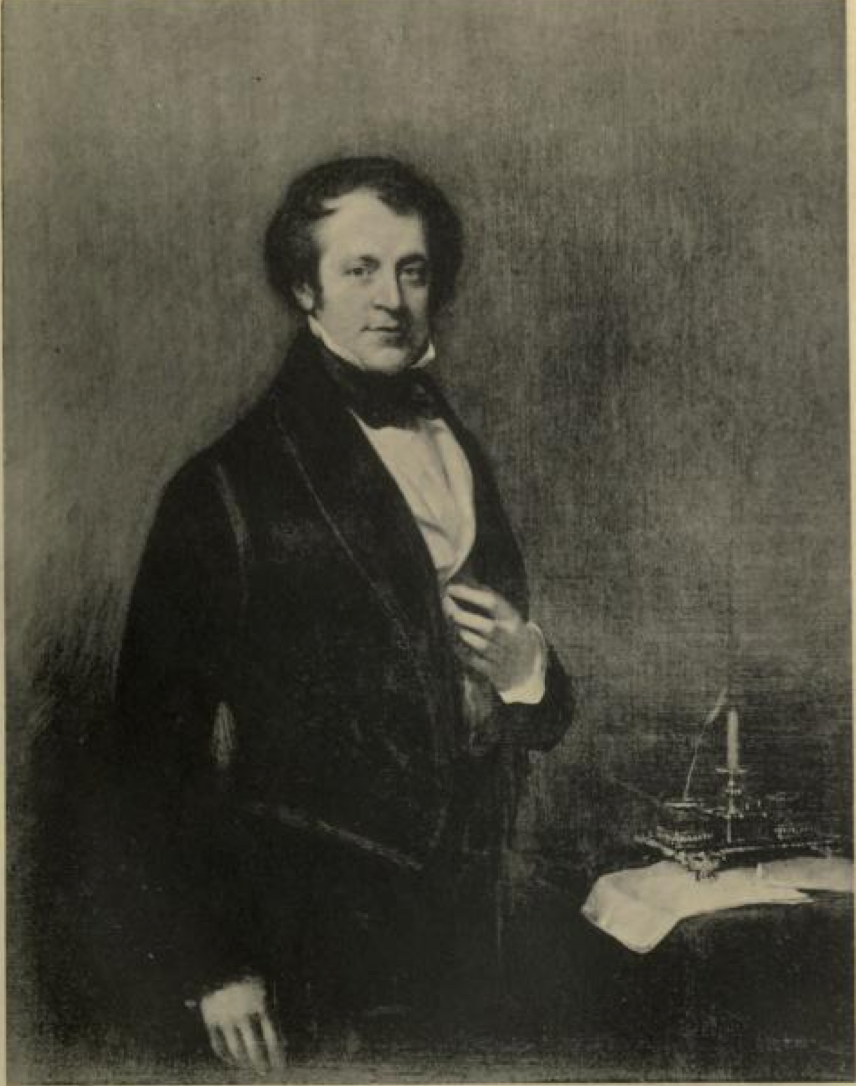
1838 portrait of George Faulkner by Benjamin Rawlinson Faulkner

George Faulkner (c. 1790 – 1862) was an English manufacturer who suggested and became involved in the creation of Owens College, the fore-runner of the Victoria University of Manchester.

== Biography ==
Faulkner was born around 1790 in Oldham Street, Manchester, in which town his life was spent. In 1812 he entered into partnership in a well-established firm of silk, cotton, and linen manufacturers. For a time its business included a fine-spinning mill, in which Faulkner's intimate friend, John Owens, was one of his partners.

At some date before Owens' death (1846), he is said to have informed Faulkner that he had made his will, in which he had left all his property to his friend. Faulkner, the story continues, refused point-blank to accept another fortune in addition to his own. Owens' irritation at this singular conduct, however, ceased after a few days, when Faulkner suggested to him the plan of leaving the bulk of his wealth for the foundation of a college which should supply a university education unconditioned by religious tests. According to a paper ascribed to Professor Henry Rogers Faulkner was himself indebted for the original suggestion to Samuel Fletcher, a public-spirited and philanthropic Manchester merchant, who, unlike Faulkner, was a nonconformist.

In 1851, Owens College was called into life at Manchester and Faulkner was elected the first chairman of its trustees. He filled this post until August 1858, taking repeated opportunities of supplementing his friend's munificence by liberal benefactions of his own.

Faulkner died 21 February 1862.
