= St Wilfrid's Church, Hulme =

Church building in Manchester, England

Coordinates: 53.469°N 2.2529°W

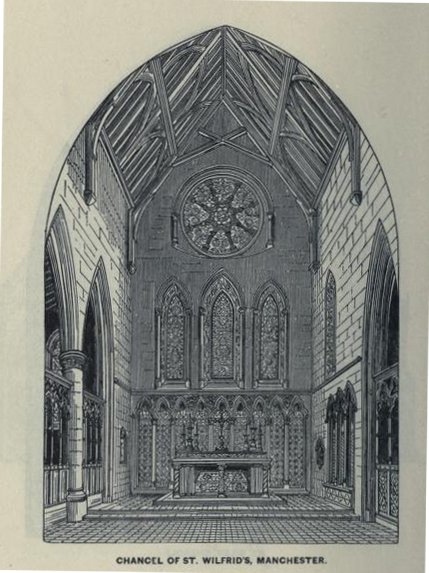
Interior of St Wilfrid's Church, Hulme, Manchester, 1842

St Wilfrid's Church in George Street, Hulme, Manchester, England, is a former Roman Catholic church. Designed by Augustus Pugin, it was his only known church building in that city.

Construction of St Wilfrid's began in 1839 and the church building was completed in 1842, although a planned tower was never built.

The church served a small number of Irish people who lived in the area. In July 1852, during a period of anti-Catholic demonstrations, the building was mistakenly rumoured to be the target of Protestant people who desired to burn it down. There had been sectarian riots in nearby Stockport in the previous month and the heightened tensions led to a fight in a pub becoming misconstrued as an imminent attack on the church. A large mob of Irish people arrived to defend the building against this non-existent threat and, although the priest, Reverend Toole, attempted to calm them and urged them to disperse, for several days afterwards a group of people stood watch over it. The church had the services of Irish priests from County Kerry continuously from the 1890s until the 1930s.

St Wilfrid's became a Grade II listed building in December 1963. Facing declining enrollment, the parish was suppressed and the church was deconsecrated in 1990. The church was converted into a factory that manufactured beds and in 1994 became an enterprise centre.

Among those buried at the church was William Bally, a Swiss sculptor and phrenologist.

== See also ==
- Listed buildings in Manchester-M15
