= John Owens (merchant) =

English merchant and philanthropist (1790–1846)

John Owens (1790 – 29 July 1846) was an English merchant and philanthropist, whose bequest helped found part of the University of Manchester.

== Life and career ==
Owens was born in Manchester, England, in 1790. His father was Owen Owens, a native of Holywell in Flintshire, Wales, who married Sarah Humphreys in 1788 and soon after moved with her to the rapidly industrialising town of Manchester. Once there, he became a prosperous merchant.

Historians such as H. B. Charlton and William Whyte have noted that details of the life of John Owens are sparse and that, according to Whyte, he is historically a "shadowy" character. The only one of three brothers to survive infancy, Owens was educated at a private school at Ardwick Green until around the age of 14. He then began work for his father's firm, which advertised itself as "hat-linings, currier and furrier". Certainly by 1819, and probably in 1815, he had become a partner in the business, which by then described itself as "manufacturers" and, since 1812, had been exporting its products rather than being completely reliant on domestic trade. The range of products had expanded to include umbrellas and various cotton goods made using the outwork system and almost entirely exported to the Americas. It was based at Carpenter's Lane, off Tib Street in Manchester, while Owens lived with his father at Nelson Street, variously described as being in Chorlton on Medlock and Rusholme.

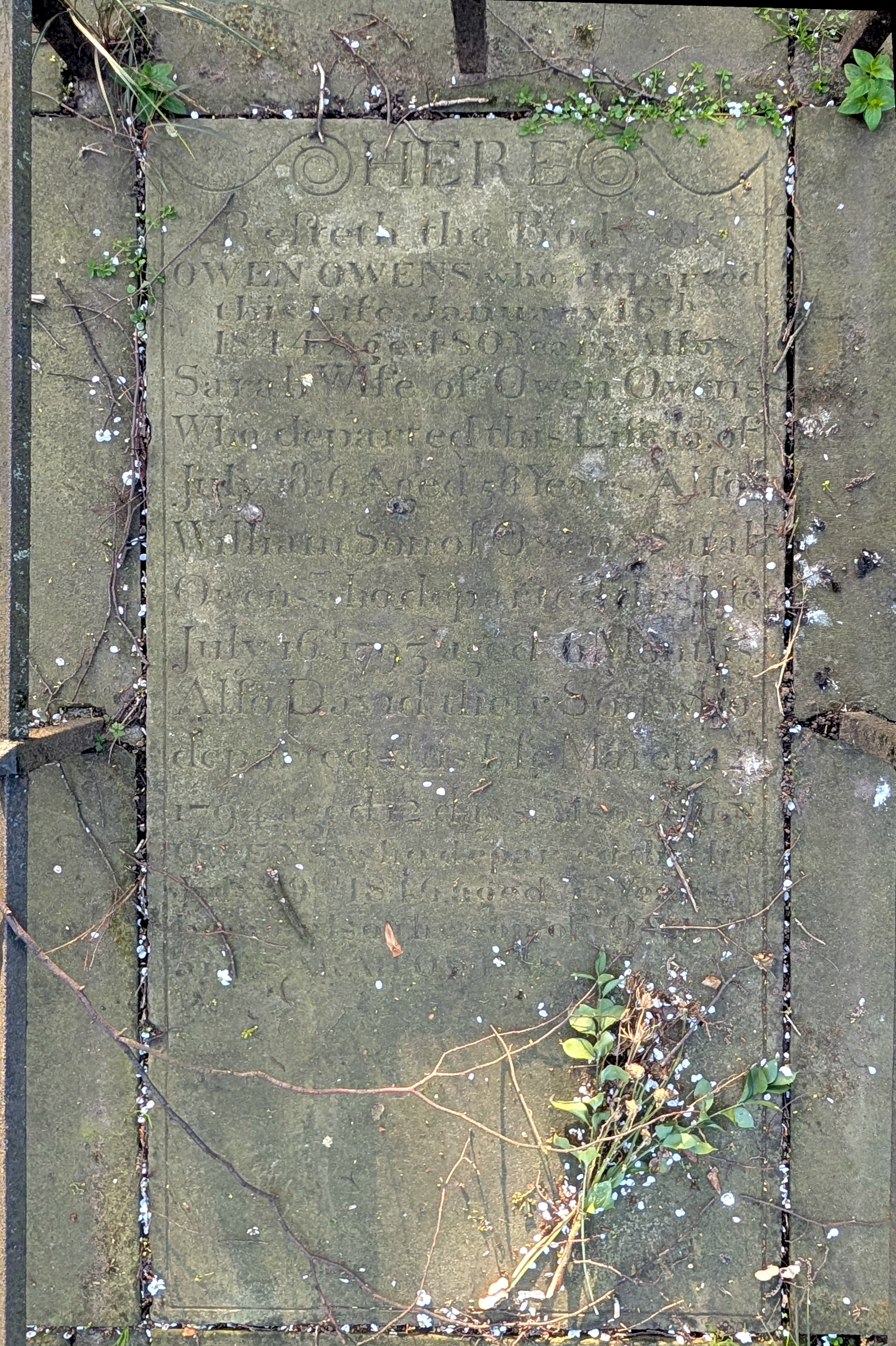
The grave of John Owens in Manchester

From 1825, the Owens family were for 18 years investors in the cotton-spinning business of Samuel Faulkner, whose son, George, had been a friend of John Owens since his schooldays. Their £10,000 investment produced an annual return of almost 10 per cent until it was decided to withdraw the capital. Following the retirement of Owen Owens from the family business around 1830, the hard-working, somewhat parsimonious John Owens expanded its geographic market while reducing its range of goods. The cheap cotton products ceased to be manufactured but the countries to which it exported now included China, India and the Middle East. By 1840, Owens was also attempting to leverage the profits from that business by speculating in shares and moneylending. It was these new activities that most concerned him from thereon. the remaining years of his life.

Unlike his garrulous father, Owens was a quiet, book-ish person. (Note: Whyte repeats a quote that Owens "liked reading, but not to the extent of buying books".) He was often ill, never married, did not mix much with other business people in Manchester, and had few friends other than George Faulkner. He was a Liberal in politics and a Congregationalist by religion, although in his later life he stopped worshipping in chapel and instead attended the nearby Anglican St Saviour's Church. Whyte says that both Samuel Wilson Warneford, "a grasping, avaricious, bigoted reactionary" whose riches did much to develop higher education at Queen's College, Birmingham, and Owens - "a parsimonious, work-obsessed, easily offended bachelor, who gave little to charity in his lifetime" - were "disagreeable men, with deep pockets and few friends".

== Philanthropy ==
Owen Owens died in January 1844 and John Owens made a final will in 1845, having rushed through a provisional document in the previous May when he had become very ill. From very soon after his father's death, Owens had desired to bequeath some of his estate for charitable purposes, including the foundation of a college in Manchester. It is sometimes claimed, although there is no evidence to support it, that this desire to fund a new college was done at the suggestion of his friends, George Faulkner and Samuel Fletcher. Historian Brian Clapp also believes there is probably no truth in claims that Owens had intended to leave his entire estate to Faulkner, since the final document left a considerable proportion to other people.

Owens died at Nelson Street on 29 July 1846. His bequests to friends and charities amounted to some £52,000, while for the college he left £96,654. Among the conditions for its foundation the most important was that which discountenanced any sort of religious test for students or teachers. He was buried at St John's Church, Manchester: the memorial to him there was subsequently moved into the John Owens Building of the university.

The eponymous Owens College, Manchester, opened in 1851 and is now part of the University of Manchester.
