= Rubiadin =

Names
- Preferred IUPAC name 1,3-Dihydroxy-2-methylanthracene-9,10-dione
- Other names Rubiadine; 1,3-Dihydroxy-2-methyl-9,10-anthraquinone; 1,3-Dihydroxy-2-methylanthraquinone

Identifiers
CAS Number	117-02-2
3D model (JSmol)	Interactive image
ChemSpider	110563
ECHA InfoCard	100.208.613
PubChem CID	124062
UNII	CY0UH3X06R
CompTox Dashboard (EPA)	DTXSID90151651
- InChI: InChI=1S/C15H10O4/c1-7-11(16)6-10-12(13(7)17)15(19)9-5-3-2-4-8(9)14(10)18/h2-6,16-17H,1H3 Key: IRZTUXPRIUZXMP-UHFFFAOYSA-N
- SMILES: CC1=C(C=C2C(=C1O)C(=O)C3=CC=CC=C3C2=O)O

Properties
Chemical formula	C_{15}H_{10}O_{4}
Molar mass	254.241 g·mol^{−1}
- Except where otherwise noted, data are given for materials in their standard state (at 25 °C [77 °F], 100 kPa). Infobox references

Rubiadin is a bioactive anthraquinone dye that occurs naturally in several plant species, including Morinda citrifolia.

== History ==
Although rubiadin was first isolated in 1853 by Edward Schunck from the Rubia tinctorum, it was not until 1893 that Schunck and Leon Marchlewski succeeded in isolating rubiadin glucoside from Dutch madder root. The first synthesis of the compound was achieved in 1927.

== Occurrence ==
Rubiadin occurs in plants of the genus Rubia and others. It is one of the pigments of dyer's madders, where it is present as a glucoside. Its monomethyl ether has been isolated from Morinda longiflora and Morinda citrifolia.

== Extraction and presentation ==
Several methods for synthesizing rubiadin have been described. One approach is the synthesis of rubiadin from phthalic anhydride and 2,6-dihydroxytoluene in two reaction steps. However, the yields of both steps were low (33% and 54%, respectively), and the reproducibility of this method was very poor. Another synthesis route proceeds via 2-methylpurpurin (1,3,4-trihydroxy-2-methylanthraquinone), but this method requires five steps and each reaction step affords a low yield. A further described synthesis of rubiadin derivatives involves Diels-Alder reactions with halogenated naphthoquinones and dienes. In addition, rubiadin can be obtained by the condensation of 3-bromo-2,6-dimethoxytoluene with a phthalide.

== Properties ==
Rubiadin is a yellow to orange solid, and is soluble in organic solvents.

== Use ==
Rubiadin is a constituent of natural colorants.
