= William Sturgeon =

English electrical engineer and inventor (1783–1850)

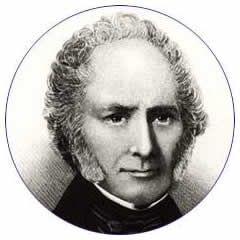
- Born: 22 May 1783; Whittington, Lancashire, England
- Died: 4 December 1850 (aged 67); Prestwich, Lancashire, England
- Resting place: Church of St Mary the Virgin, Prestwich
- Known for: Inventing the electromagnet (1824); Improving the electric motor (1832); Improving the induction coil (1837)

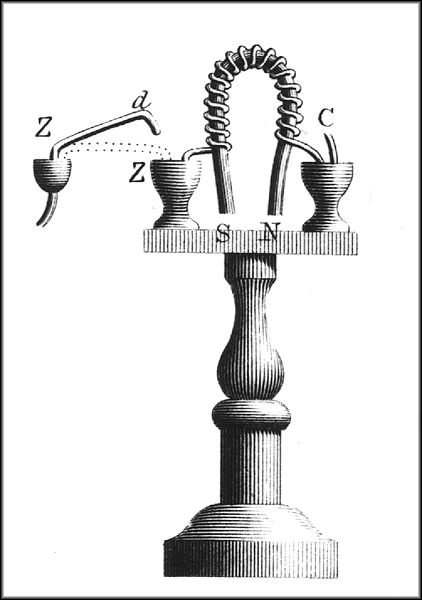
The first artificial electromagnet, invented by Sturgeon in 1824. Sturgeon's original drawing from his 1824 paper to the British Royal Society of Arts, Manufactures, and Commerce. The magnet was made of 18 turns of bare copper wire (insulated wire had not yet been invented).

William Sturgeon (/ˈstɜːrdʒən/; 22 May 1783 – 4 December 1850) was an English electrical engineer and inventor who made the first electromagnet and the first practical electric motor.

== Early life ==
Sturgeon was born on 22 May 1783 in Whittington, near Carnforth, Lancashire, and became apprenticed to a shoemaker.

== Career ==
Sturgeon joined the army in 1802 and taught himself mathematics and physics. In 1824, he became lecturer in Science and Philosophy at the East India Company's Military Seminary at Addiscombe, Surrey, and in the following year he exhibited his first electromagnet. He displayed its power by lifting nine pounds with a seven-ounce piece of iron wrapped with wire through which a current from a single battery was sent.

In 1832, he was appointed to the lecturing staff of the Adelaide Gallery of Practical Science in London, where he first demonstrated the DC electric motor incorporating a commutator.

In 1836, he established the journal Annals of Electricity, Magnetism and Chemistry, and in the same year he invented a galvanometer.

Sturgeon was a close associate of John Peter Gassiot and Charles Vincent Walker, and the three were instrumental in founding the London Electrical Society in 1837.

In 1840, he became superintendent of the Royal Victoria Gallery of Practical Science in Manchester. He formed a close social circle with John Davies, one of the Gallery's promoters, and Davies's student James Prescott Joule, a circle that eventually extended to include Edward William Binney and the surgeon John Leigh. The Gallery closed in 1842, and he earned a living by lecturing and demonstrating.

In 1843, he started the monthly journal, The Annals of Philosophical Discovery and Monthly Reporter of the Progress of Practical Science; issue 1 of volume 1 is dated July 1843. Each month's issue contains a mixture of original "long" papers (over 5 pages long), republished papers from foreign journals (translated where necessary) and shorter articles. However, the journal did not prove successful, and ceased publication at the end of volume 1, in December 1843. This single volume is archived at Internet.org.

== Death and burial ==
Sturgeon died in Prestwich, Lancashire (now in Greater Manchester) on 4 December 1850. He is buried there, in the churchyard of the St Mary the Virgin: he is identified on his grave slab as "William Sturgeon – The Electrician".

== Bibliography ==
- Gee, William. "Sturgeon, William" . In Lee, Sidney (ed.). Dictionary of National Biography. Vol. 55. London: Smith, Elder & Co. pp. 131–135.
- Gee, William; James, Frank A. J. L. (revised) (2004). "Sturgeon, William (1783–1850)". Oxford Dictionary of National Biography (online ed.). Oxford University Press. doi:10.1093/ref:odnb/26748. (Subscription, Wikipedia Library access or UK public library membership required.)
- Kargon, R. H. (1977). Science in Victorian Manchester: enterprise and expertise. Baltimore: Johns Hopkins University Press. ISBN 0-8018-1969-5.
- Vibart, H. M. (1894). Addiscombe: its heroes and men of note. Westminster: Archibald Constable. pp. 77–80.
