= William Bally =

Swiss sculptor (1796–1858)

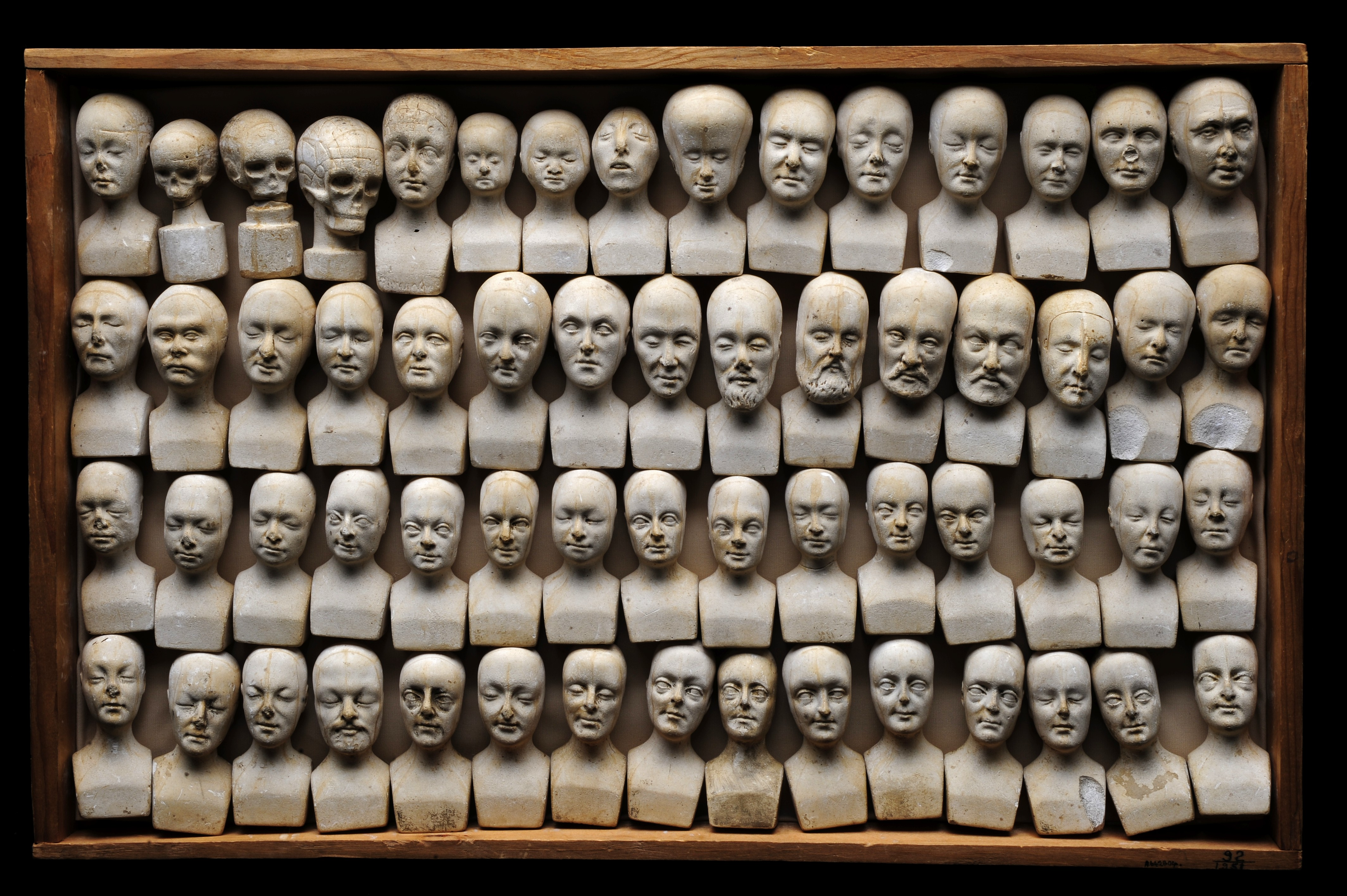
Wooden case containing 60 small phrenological heads, by William Bally, ca. 1831

William Bally (1796 – 8 November 1858) was a Swiss sculptor and phrenologist active in Manchester, United Kingdom.

== Life ==
Born in 1796 in Locarno, Switzerland, William Bally travelled as an artist with Johann Caspar Spurzheim from 1829. In 1832 it was advertised that he had created a set of 60 small plaster phrenological busts in collaboration with him. He came to England and employed George Holyoake in Birmingham during the 1830s. At this time he was an associate of George Combe. The relationship with Holyoake ended badly, on Holyoake's account, with Bally moving to Manchester and not making a promised cast of his head.

By 1836, Bally was curator of the Manchester Phrenological Society, which had been founded around 1829 and met for some time in rooms below his gallery. It included members who were surgeons, which may have helped him in gaining access to interesting subjects and post-mortems. The organisation accumulated a large number of phrenological busts, with 210 being acquired in its first year. By the 1840s, phrenological exhibitions were being held at the Manchester Mechanics' Institute, attracting over 100,000 visitors and comprising thousands of casts, busts and masks. (Note: According to Alice Cliff, the foundation of the Manchester Phrenological Society in 1829 followed those that had been established in Edinburgh, London, Wakefield and Liverpool. While generally agreeing with the chronological order, some sources say that the MPS was founded in 1830.)

In 1841, Bally, who at least sometimes used a pantograph to create his work, made casts of inscriptions on Manx crosses, and later sold them to the antiquarian Henry Dryden. He took part in a demonstration of hypnosis by James Braid in 1844. In July 1849, after returning from a trip to the continent, (Note: Bally had at one point returned to Locarno intending to remain there for the rest of his life. Whether this is the trip referred to is uncertain. The historian Roger Cooter says that he retired to Switzerland in 1848, while Alice Cliff says he had several absences from Manchester between 1848 and 1852.) Bally was advertising his services as a phrenologist with rooms at 54 King Street, Manchester, where he was charging five shillings for a consultation and rather less for attending to more than two people from the same family.

Bally suffered from ill health in his later years. In December 1850, it was announced that he had suffered a third "paralytic stroke" and was once again debilitated. A subscription fund was organised to support him and, together with a benefit concert, raised around £400. An 1851 article in The Times suggested that the coloured waxes that he used for modelling contained toxic materials and that these were the cause of ulceration in his throat and paralysis in his hands and arms; he was periodically "completely paralysed". The substances varied according to colour but included white lead, copper, chrome yellow and vermillion. They probably entered his body through absorption and ingestion.

Despite his poor health, Bally exhibited a bust at the Great Exhibition of 1851. He had recovered sufficiently to work by late 1852 and in early 1853 moved premises to Victoria Street. He reduced his prices and moved the studio to his house at Peel Terrace, on Tamworth Street, Hulme, in December 1855. His wife, Anna Maria Matilda Bally, died there in February 1856 and later that year Bally was once again operating his studio from Victoria Street.

Continued poor health meant that the funds raised by his supporters in 1850 had largely sustained Bally thereafter, being paid to him in instalments of no more than 30 shillings per week. He was confined to bed for the last two years of his life, and in July 1858 a further appeal for funds to assist him was made because the original amount was close to exhaustion. This drew support from donors such as Oliver Heywood and John Potter.

Bally died in Manchester on 8 November 1858 and was buried with his wife a week later in a tomb at St Wilfrid's Roman Catholic Chapel in Hulme, where he had worshipped. In accordance with his instructions, a death mask that he had made of his wife was placed in his coffin.

Bally had amassed a collection of about 1000 phrenological busts, but most of it had been bought from him during his lifetime with the intention that it would be put on display in a museum that, at the time of his death, had not been built. They were stored for some time at the Manchester Mechanics' Institute on Cooper Street and later entrusted to the interim care of Manchester Corporation. The remaining busts were bequeathed to Beneditti Lamarto, who was another Swiss practitioner. The fate of the collection is unknown: it was deposited in a museum at Harpurhey in 1860, and thereafter there is no record, although some examples of his work have been discovered and may or may not have formed part of that collection.

== Works ==
Around 1833, Bally's book titled Mons. Bally’s Lectures on Casting, Modelling, &c. was published in Nottingham by J. Hicklin and Co.

Bally's purely sculptural works included a wax portrait of John Scott, 1st Earl of Eldon, and busts of the calico printer Salis Schwabe and Samuel Fletcher. At the Liverpool Academy of Arts he exhibited busts of Samuel Hope (1832) and Thomas Henry Illidge (1837). His phrenological busts included a death mask of William Palmer, a murderer who was executed. In 1844, he also made a cast of the interior of John Dalton's cranium and a cyst therein, having arrived at the Manchester Royal Infirmary too late to make a cast of the head and face. (Note: A cast of Dalton's head was made by a Mr Politi, whose arrival at the scene preceded that of Bally.)

Thomas Turner, a surgeon who lectured at the Manchester Royal Institution, used Bally's phrenological casts in demonstrations there in the 1840s.
