= St Saviour's Church, Chorlton on Medlock =

Former church in Chorlton on Medlock, England

Coordinates: 53.46567°N 2.22652°W

St Saviour's Church on the corner of Plymouth Grove and Upper Brook Street, Chorlton on Medlock, Manchester, was an Anglican parish church. Construction began in 1835, with the estimated £6000 cost being met by public subscription. It was consecrated on 11 November 1836. The primary benefactor for the construction was Scholes Birch, whose son, Edward, became the first rector. The foundation stone was laid on 2 July 1835.

In May 1868, a part of the parish of St Saviour's was assigned to the church of St John Chrysostom, Rusholme. A further change came in December 1955 when some of the parish was exchanged with St Thomas's, Ardwick, and another reorganisation in July 1967 saw some of it assigned to St Ambrose, Chorlton upon Medlock. In June 1971, what remained of the parish joined with that of St Paul with St Luke as Christ Church, Brunswick.

The original church building was demolished after a final service on 28 August 1960. Services were thereafter held in temporary location until 1964. The plan had been to construct a new building, and indeed a foundation stone was laid in May 1963 and dedication mass held on 21 March 1964 when completed, but because of a lack of parishioners due to Council wholesale clearance of local housing, the parish joined Christ Church, on Brunswick Street in 1974 (actually the building was constructed and photos are extent of it in the city archives).

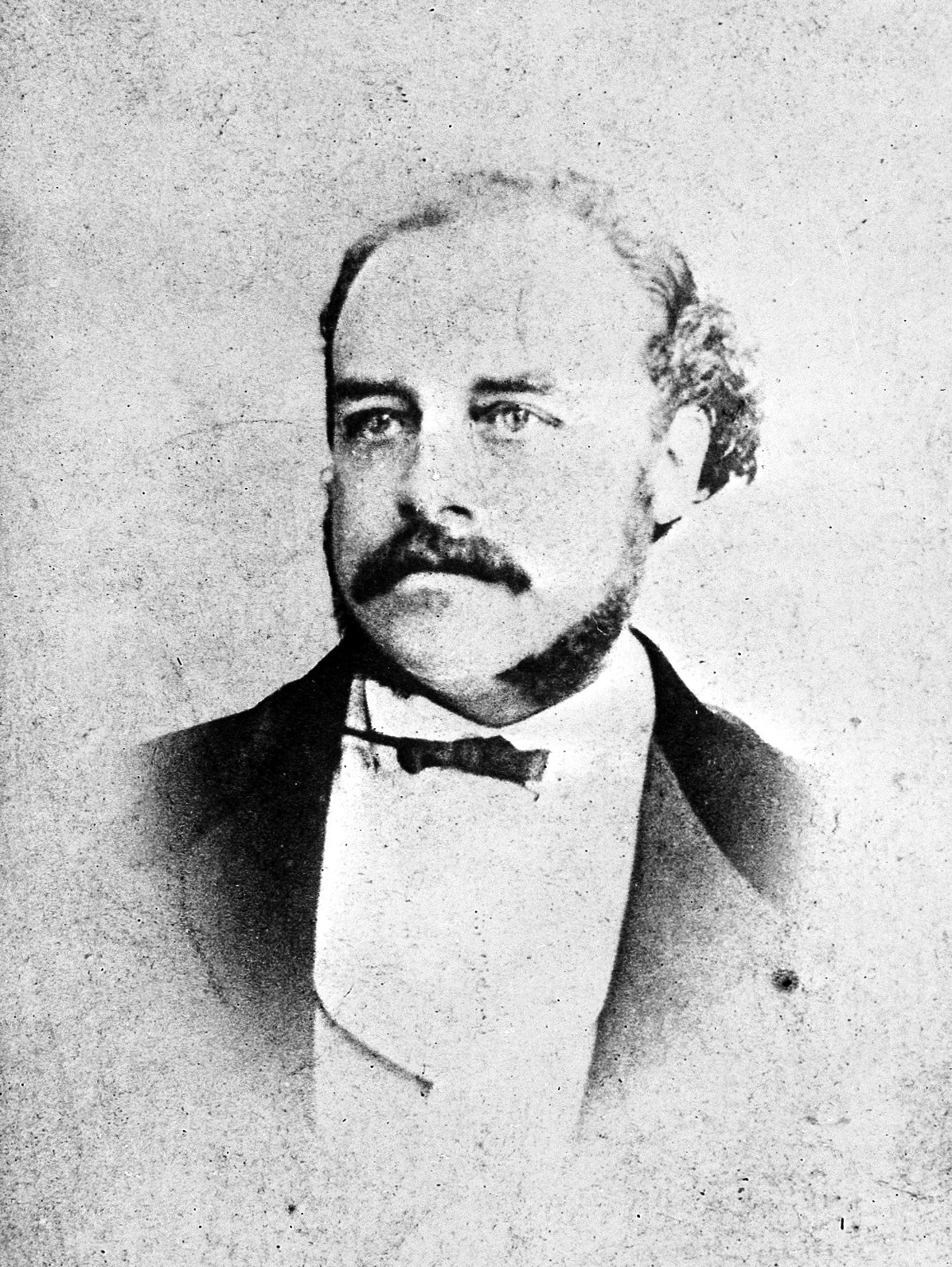
Portrait. Credit: Wellcome Library

== Notable burials ==
Frederick Crace Calvert (14 November 1819 - 24 October 1873). Notable chemist he was the first person to produce Carbolic Acid on an industrial scale. Edward Birch (17 May 1809 - 9 August 1886) was the inaugural archdeacon of Blackburn. He was rector of St Saviour's between 1836 and 1868 and is buried in the churchyard.
