= Edward William Binney =

British geologist

Edward William Binney FRS FGS
- Born: 1812; Morton, Nottinghamshire, UK
- Died: 1882; Manchester, Lancashire, UK
- Occupation: Geologist

Signature
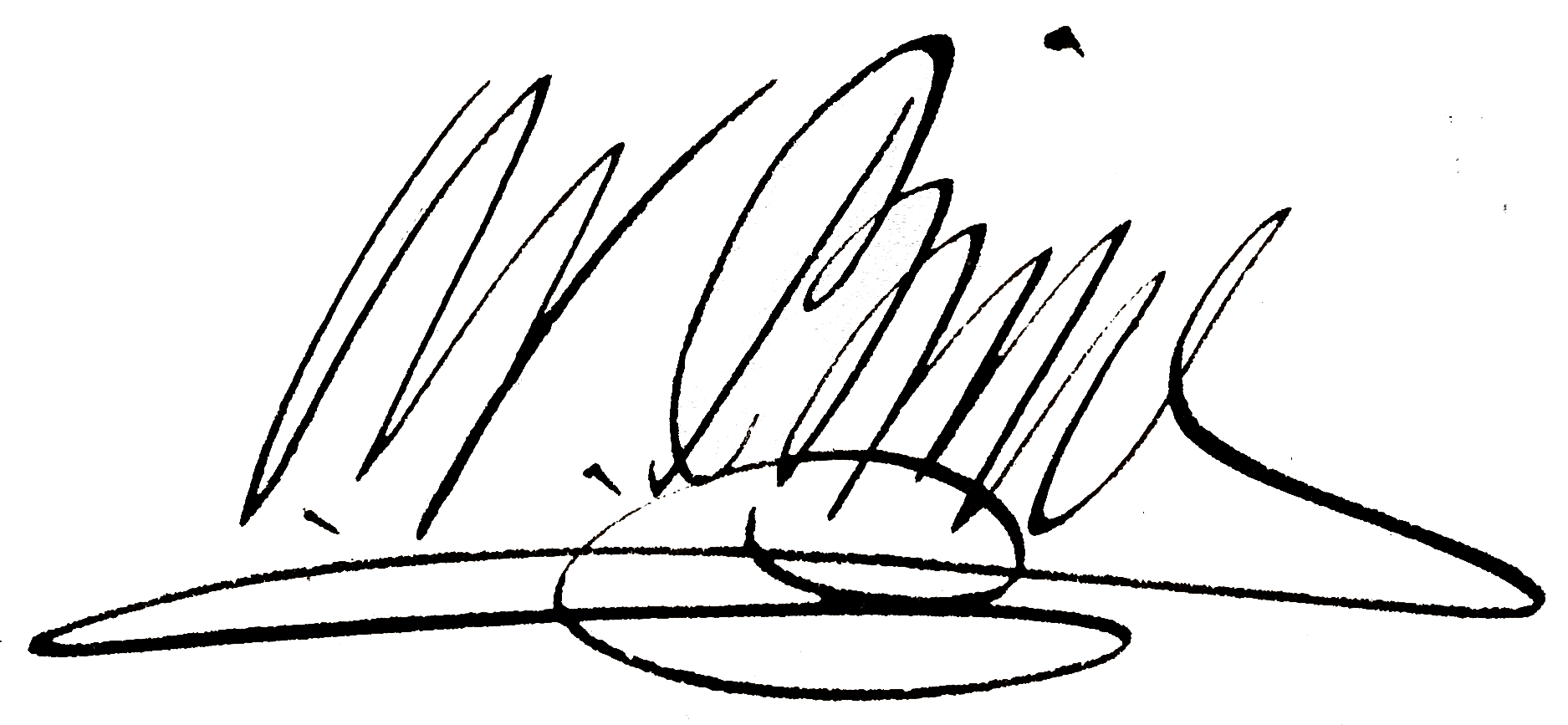

Edward William Binney (1812–1882) was an English geologist.

== Background ==
Edward William Binney was born at Morton, in Nottinghamshire in 1812, and educated at Queen Elizabeth's Grammar School, Gainsborough. He was articled to a solicitor in Chesterfield, and settled in Manchester in 1836. He retired soon afterwards from legal practice and gave his chief attention to geological pursuits.

== Geological research ==
Working especially on the Carboniferous and Permian rocks of the north of England, he also studied the Drift deposits of Lancashire, which resulted in him and Joseph Dalton Hooker finding the first coal balls, and made himself familiar with the geology of the area around Manchester. On the Coal Measures in particular he became an acknowledged authority, and his Observations on the Structure of Fossil Plants found in the Carboniferous Strata (1868–75) formed one of the monographs of the Palaeontographical Society. His large collection of fossils was placed in Owens College, Manchester.

== Activities ==
Binney assisted in founding the Manchester Geological Society in 1838, and was then chosen as one of its Honorary Secretaries, later being elected president in 1857 and again in 1865. He was also successively Secretary (1848–52) and four-times President of the Manchester Literary and Philosophical Society (1862–4, 1870–2, 1876–8, and 1880–2).

Binney was part of a close Manchester social circle that included James Prescott Joule, William Sturgeon, John Davies and John Leigh.

He was elected a fellow of the Royal Society in 1856 and died at Manchester in 1882.

Professional and academic associations
Preceded by James Prescott Joule	President of the Manchester Literary and Philosophical Society; 1862–64	Succeeded by Robert Angus Smith
Preceded by James Prescott Joule	President of the Manchester Literary and Philosophical Society; 1870–72	Succeeded by James Prescott Joule
Preceded by Henry Edward Schunck	President of the Manchester Literary and Philosophical Society; 1876–78	Succeeded by James Prescott Joule
Preceded by James Prescott Joule	President of the Manchester Literary and Philosophical Society; 1880–82	Succeeded by Sir Henry Enfield Roscoe
Preceded by James Prescott Joule	Secretary of the Manchester Literary and Philosophical Society; 1848–52	Succeeded by Henry Halford Jones
