= Friedrich Heeren =

German chemist (1803–1885)

- Born: 11 August 1803; Hamburg Germany
- Died: 2 May 1885 (aged 81); Hanover Germany

Friedrich Heeren (11 August 1803 – 2 May 1885) was a German chemist.

He received his doctorate in Göttingen, and from 1831 was an instructor of technological-chemical subjects at the Polytechnic School in Hannover (Höheren Gewerbeschule). Here he taught classes in physics, mineralogy and chemistry.

With technologist Karl Karmarsch (1803-1879), he published a technical dictionary (Technisches Wörterbuch). Also, with Karmarsch, he developed a process for the preparation of gun cotton. In 1881 he introduced an apparatus for the testing of milk (lactometer, patent# 241655).
