= Fellowship of the Royal Colleges of Surgeons =

UK and Irish professional qualification

Fellowship of the Royal Colleges of Surgeons (FRCS)
- Sponsored by: The four Royal Colleges of Surgeons of the United Kingdom and Ireland
- Website: www.jcie.org.uk; www.jscfe.co.uk

Fellowship of the Royal Colleges of Surgeons (FRCS) is a professional qualification to practise as a senior surgeon in the United Kingdom or Ireland. It is bestowed on an intercollegiate basis by the four Royal Colleges of Surgeons (the Royal College of Surgeons of England, Royal College of Surgeons in Ireland (chartered 1784), Royal College of Surgeons of Edinburgh (chartered 1505), and Royal College of Physicians and Surgeons of Glasgow). The initials may be used as post-nominal letters.

Several Commonwealth countries have organisations that bestow similar qualifications, among them the FRCSC in Canada, FRACS in Australia and New Zealand, FCS(SA) in South Africa, FCSHK in Hong Kong, FCPS by College of Physicians and Surgeons Pakistan in Pakistan and FCPS by College of Physicians & Surgeons of Mumbai in India.

The intercollegiate FRCS examinations are administered by two committees, the JCIE (Joint Committee on Intercollegiate Examinations, which handles domestic examinations) and the JSCFE (Joint Surgical Colleges Fellowship Examination, which handles overseas examinations). This system replaced the earlier one in which each college administered its own examinations. First the curricula were intercollegiately coordinated by the ISCP (Intercollegiate Surgical Curriculum Programme) of the JCST (Joint Committee on Surgical Training), and then the examinations became intercollegiate.

The original fellowship was available in general surgery and in certain specialties—ophthalmic or ENT surgery, or obstetrics and gynaecology—which were not indicated in the initials. It came to be taken midway through training. Each of the four Royal Colleges of Surgeons of the UK and Ireland used to administer its own examinations. The four postnominals were FRCS(Eng), FRCS(Ed), FRCS(G), and FRCS(I). The FRCS designation without further specification then referred by convention/tradition to FRCS(Eng) specifically. Today the examination and qualification are intercollegiate, although each surgeon can still choose afterward to be affiliated with one or more specific colleges. (In Canada the FRCS(C) qualification is administered by the Royal College of Physicians and Surgeons of Canada.)

There are now a range of higher fellowships, taken at the end of higher specialist training and often in narrower fields, the first of which was FRCS (Orth) in orthopaedics. Others include FRCS (Urol) in urology and FRCS (OMFS) in maxillofacial surgery.

== Membership of the Royal Colleges of Surgeons ==
The MRCS examinations are also now intercollegiate.

== Fellows ==
The original 300 Fellows of the Royal College of Surgeons of England (FRCS) include:

- Marcus Beck (1843–1893)
- John Badley (1783–1870)
- John Abernethy (1764–1831)
- Robert Keate (1777–1857)
- Richard Partridge (1805–1873)
- Joseph Jordan (1787–1873)
- Sir Ernest Marshall Cowell (1886–1971)

Biographies of all original 300 Fellows are in Plarr's Lives of the Fellows.

See Category:Fellows of the Royal College of Surgeons of England for more examples of Fellows.

== See also ==
- Fellow of the American College of Surgeons
- Fellowship in Dental Surgery FDSRCS England
