= Thomas Turner (surgeon) =

English surgeon and medical educator

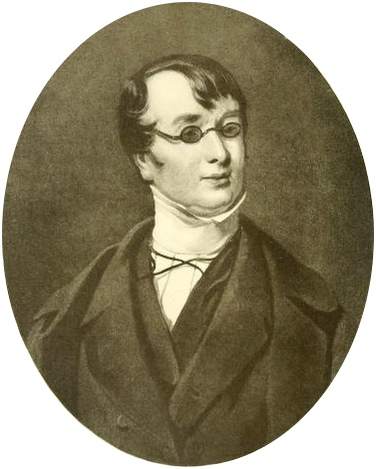
Thomas Turner

Thomas Turner, FRCS, FLS, (13 August 1793 – 17 December 1873) was an English surgeon known primarily for his involvement in developing medical education outside its then traditional base of London. He established a medical school in Manchester and was both a Fellow of the Royal College of Surgeons of England and the Linnean Society of London.

== Early life ==
The youngest child of Edmund Turner, a banker of Truro, and Joanna his wife, daughter of Richard Ferris, he was born there on 13 August 1793. He was educated at Truro grammar school under its headmaster Cornelius Cardew, and was then apprenticed to Nehemiah Duck, one of the surgeons to St Peter's Hospital, Bristol.

Turner left Bristol at the end of his apprenticeship for London, where, in the autumn of 1815, he entered as a student under Astley Paston Cooper, at the united borough hospitals of Guy and St. Thomas. He was admitted a licentiate of the London Society of Apothecaries and a member of the London College of Surgeons in 1816, and then went to Paris, where he spent a year. In 1817 he was appointed house surgeon at the infirmary of Manchester. He held the post until September 1820, when illness forced him to resign.

Turner then settled in Manchester, at a house in Piccadilly in the Manchester city centre. He was appointed secretary of the Manchester Natural History Society, and was also elected a member of the Manchester Literary and Philosophical Society, where he saw much of John Dalton; on 18 April 1823 he was elected one of the six councillors of the society.

On 1 November 1822 Turner in the rooms of the Literary and Philosophical Society began a successful series of lectures on the anatomy, physiology, and pathology of the human body. Other courses were given, and in 1824 Turner delivered an address in which he developed a plan for a school of medicine and surgery in Manchester. The suggestion was well received, and in October 1824 a suitable building was engaged and opened in Pine Street, where Dalton gave a course of lectures on pharmaceutical chemistry. A medico-chirurgical society for students was also established, and in 1825 the Pine Street medical school was organised, the first major provincial school of medicine in England. The Edinburgh College of Surgeons recognised the course of instruction given at Manchester in February 1825; the London College was more reluctant, but Astley Cooper intervened and consent was obtained. Sir James McGrigor on behalf of the medical department of the Navy and Army recognised the course 20 August 1827.

Turner was appointed surgeon to the Deaf and Dumb Institution in 1825. He moved shortly after his marriage in 1826 from Piccadilly to a house in the upper part of King Street, and in the autumn of 1830 to Mosley Street, where he lived the rest of his life. In August 1830 he was elected a surgeon to the Manchester Royal Infirmary, and soon acquired a substantial medical practice.

On 31 July 1832 Turner laid the foundation of a new and larger lecture-theatre, which was opened in the following October. The medical school progressed steadily under Turner's control, and the next few years witnessed the closing of the rival Mount Street and Marston Street schools of medicine and the growth of the Pine Street school. The medical school in Chatham Street entered into an agreement with the Pine Street school in 1859, and the Manchester Royal School of Medicine came into existence. In 1872 it was amalgamated with Owens College as its medical faculty, Turner was invited to give the inaugural address, and a sum of money was set apart for the "Turner Medical Prize" in commemoration of his services.

== Later life ==
In 1843 Turner had been appointed honorary professor of physiology at the Manchester Royal Institution, where, with the exception of two years, he delivered an annual course of lectures until 1873. He was nominated a fellow of the Royal College of Surgeons of England in 1843, and he served on its council from 1865 to 1873. He was occupied from 1852 with the Manchester and Salford Sanitary Association, and the condition of factory hands.

His early lectures at the Manchester Royal Institution utilised phrenological casts created by William Bally.

Turner died in Manchester on 17 December 1873, and was buried in the churchyard of Marton, near Skipton-in-Craven. He had worked to break the monopoly of the London medical schools, and for the principle of state medicine.

== Works ==
Turner published:

- Outlines of a System of Medico-Chirurgical Education, London and Manchester, 1824; 2nd edit. 1826.
- An Address to the Inhabitants of Lancashire, &c., on the Present State of the Medical Profession, London, 1825.
- A Practical Treatise on the Arterial System, London, 1825.
- Outlines of a Course of Lectures on the Laws of Animal Life, Manchester, 1825.
- Outlines of a Course of Lectures on the Anatomy, Physiology, and Pathology of the Human Body, Manchester, 1833.
- Anatomico-Chirurgical Observations on Dislocations of the Astragalus, Worcester, 1843.

== Family ==
On 3 March 1826 Turner married Anna, daughter of James Clarke, of Medham, near Newport, Isle of Wight.
