= James Prescott Joule =

English physicist (1818–1889)

James Prescott Joule FRS FRSE
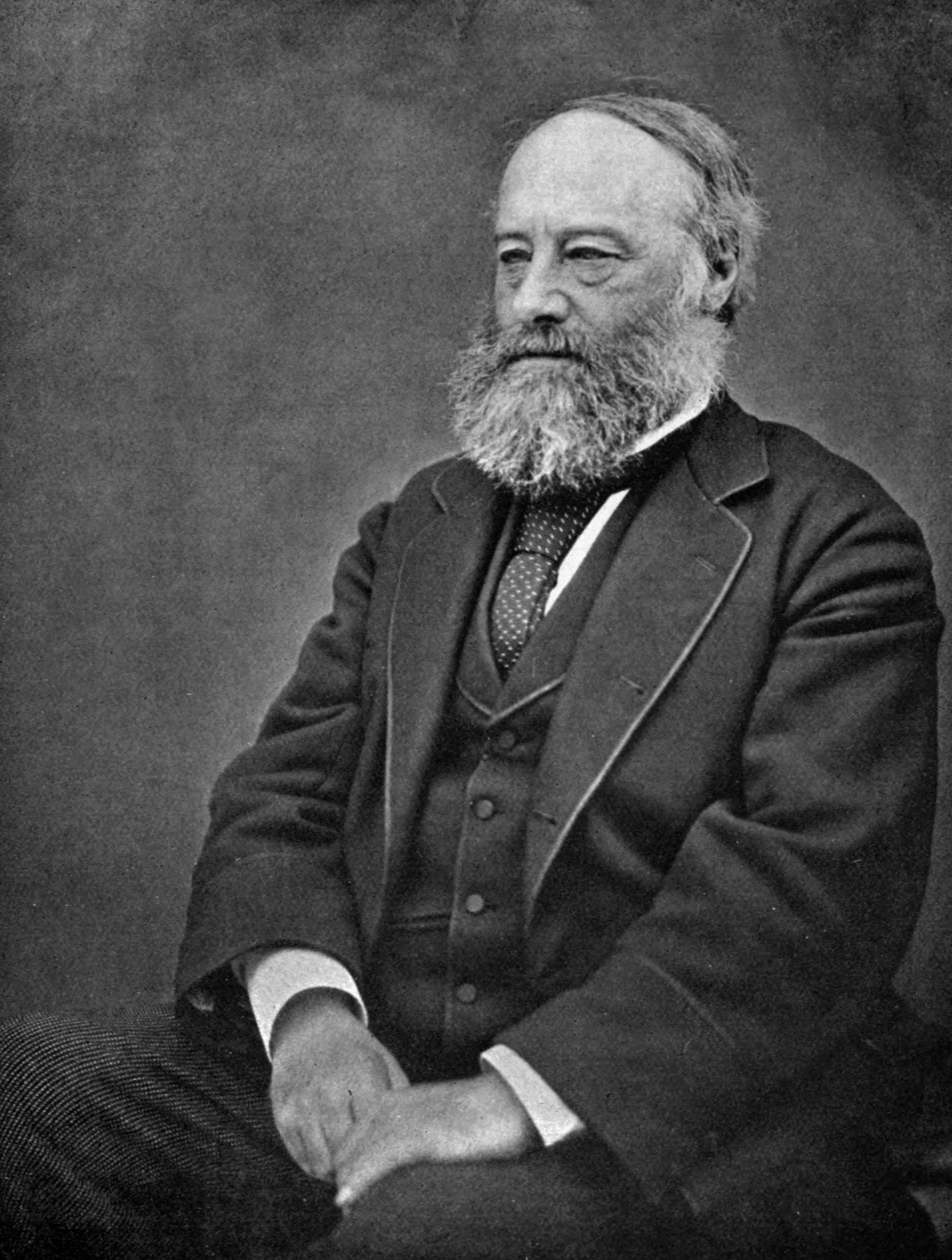
- Born: 24 December 1818; Salford, Lancashire, United Kingdom
- Died: 11 October 1889 (aged 70); Sale, Cheshire, UK
- Known for: Disproving caloric theory; Joule expansion; Joule heating; Joule–Thomson effect; Gough–Joule effect; First law of thermodynamics; Magnetostriction; Mechanical equivalent of heat
- Spouse: Amelia Grimes (m. 1847; died 1854)
- Children: 3
- Awards: Royal Medal (1852); Copley Medal (1870); Albert Medal (1880)
- Scientific career
- Fields: Physics

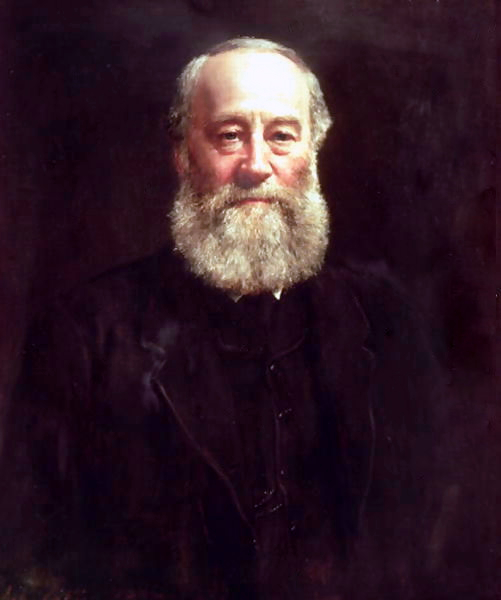
James Prescott Joule by John Collier (1882)

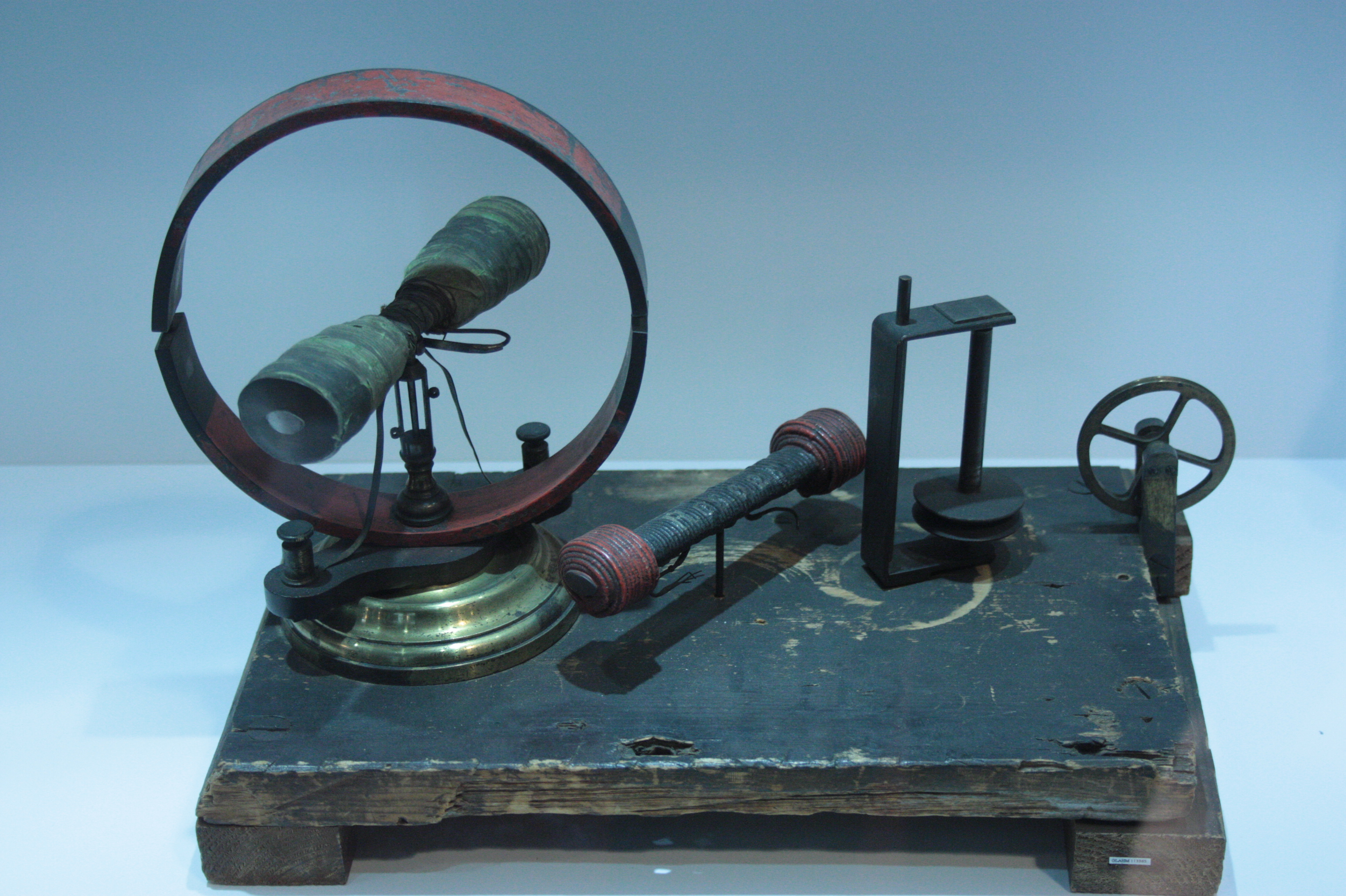
An electric motor presented to Kelvin by James Joule in 1842. Hunterian Museum, Glasgow.

James Prescott Joule (/dʒuːl/; (Note: OED: "Although some people of this name call themselves (dʒaʊl), and others (dʒəʊl) [the OED format for /dʒoʊl/], it is almost certain that J. P. Joule (and at least some of his relatives) used (dʒuːl).") 24 December 1818 – 11 October 1889) was an English physicist. Joule studied the nature of heat and discovered its relationship to mechanical work. This led to the law of conservation of energy, which in turn led to the development of the first law of thermodynamics. The SI unit of energy, the joule (J), is named after him.

He worked with Lord Kelvin to develop an absolute thermodynamic temperature scale, which came to be called the Kelvin scale. Joule also made observations of magnetostriction, and he found the relationship between the current through a resistor and the heat dissipated, which is also called Joule's first law. His experiments about energy transformations were first published in 1843.

== Early years ==
James Joule was born in 1818, the son of Benjamin Joule, a wealthy brewer, and his wife, Alice Prescott, on New Bailey Street in Salford. Joule was tutored as a young man by the famous scientist John Dalton and was strongly influenced by chemist William Henry and Manchester engineers Peter Ewart and Eaton Hodgkinson. He was fascinated by electricity, and he and his brother experimented by giving electric shocks to each other and to the family's servants.

As an adult, Joule managed the brewery. Science was merely a serious hobby. Sometime around 1840, he started to investigate the feasibility of replacing the brewery's steam engines with the newly invented electric motor. His first scientific papers on the subject were contributed to William Sturgeon's Annals of Electricity. Joule was a member of the London Electrical Society, established by Sturgeon and others.

Motivated in part by a businessman's desire to quantify the economics of the choice, and in part by his scientific inquisitiveness, he set out to determine which prime mover was more efficient. He discovered Joule's first law in 1841, that "the heat which is evolved by the proper action of any voltaic current is proportional to the square of the intensity of that current, multiplied by the resistance to conduction which it experiences". He went on to realize that burning a pound of coal in a steam engine was more economical than a costly pound of zinc consumed in an electric battery. Joule captured the output of the alternative methods in terms of a common standard, the ability to raise a mass weighing one pound to a height of one foot, the foot-pound.

However, Joule's interest diverted from the narrow financial question to that of how much work could be extracted from a given source, leading him to speculate about the convertibility of energy. In 1843 he published results of experiments showing that the heating effect he had quantified in 1841 was due to generation of heat in the conductor and not its transfer from another part of the equipment. This was a direct challenge to the caloric theory which held that heat could neither be created nor destroyed. Caloric theory had dominated thinking in the science of heat since introduced by Antoine Lavoisier in 1783. Lavoisier's prestige and the practical success of Sadi Carnot's caloric theory of the heat engine since 1824 ensured that the young Joule, working outside either academia or the engineering profession, had a difficult road ahead. Supporters of the caloric theory readily pointed to the symmetry of the Peltier–Seebeck effect to claim that heat and current were convertible in an, at least approximately, reversible process.

== The mechanical equivalent of heat ==
Further experiments and measurements with his electric motor led Joule to estimate the mechanical equivalent of heat as 4.1868 joules per calorie (work needed to raise the temperature of one gram of water by one degree Celsius or Kelvin). (Note: Joule's unit of 1 ft lbf/Btu corresponds to 5.3803×10^{−3} J/cal. Thus Joule's estimate was 4.15 J/cal, compared to the value accepted by the beginning of the 20th century of 4.1860 J/cal) He announced his results at a meeting of the chemical section of the British Association for the Advancement of Science in Cork in August 1843 and was met by silence.

Joule was undaunted and started to seek a purely mechanical demonstration of the conversion of work into heat. By forcing water through a perforated cylinder, he could measure the slight viscous heating of the fluid. He obtained a mechanical equivalent of 770 foot-pounds force per British thermal unit (4.14 J/cal). The fact that the values obtained both by electrical and purely mechanical means were in agreement to at least two significant digits was, to Joule, compelling evidence of the reality of the convertibility of work into heat.

Wherever mechanical force is expended, an exact equivalent of heat is always obtained.

— J.P. Joule, August, 1843

Joule now tried a third route. He measured the heat generated against the work done in compressing a gas. He obtained a mechanical equivalent of 798 foot-pounds force per British thermal unit (4.29 J/cal). In many ways, this experiment offered the easiest target for Joule's critics but Joule disposed of the anticipated objections by clever experimentation. Joule read his paper to the Royal Society on 20 June 1844, but his paper was rejected for publication by the Royal Society and he had to be content with publishing in the Philosophical Magazine in 1845. In the paper he was forthright in his rejection of the caloric reasoning of Carnot and Émile Clapeyron, a rejection partly theologically driven:

I conceive that this theory ... is opposed to the recognised principles of philosophy because it leads to the conclusion that vis viva may be destroyed by an improper disposition of the apparatus: Thus Mr Clapeyron draws the inference that 'the temperature of the fire being 1000 °C to 2000 °C higher than that of the boiler there is an enormous loss of vis viva in the passage of the heat from the furnace to the boiler.' Believing that the power to destroy belongs to the Creator alone I affirm ... that any theory which, when carried out, demands the annihilation of force, is necessarily erroneous.

Joule here adopts the language of vis viva (energy), possibly because Hodgkinson had read a review of Ewart's On the measure of moving force to the Literary and Philosophical Society in April 1844.

In June 1845, Joule read his paper On the Mechanical Equivalent of Heat to the British Association meeting in Cambridge. In this work, he reported his best-known experiment, involving the use of a falling weight, in which gravity does the mechanical work, to spin a paddle wheel in an insulated barrel of water which increased the temperature. He now estimated a mechanical equivalent of 819 foot-pounds force per British thermal unit (4.404 J/cal). He wrote a letter to the Philosophical Magazine, published in September 1845 describing his experiment.

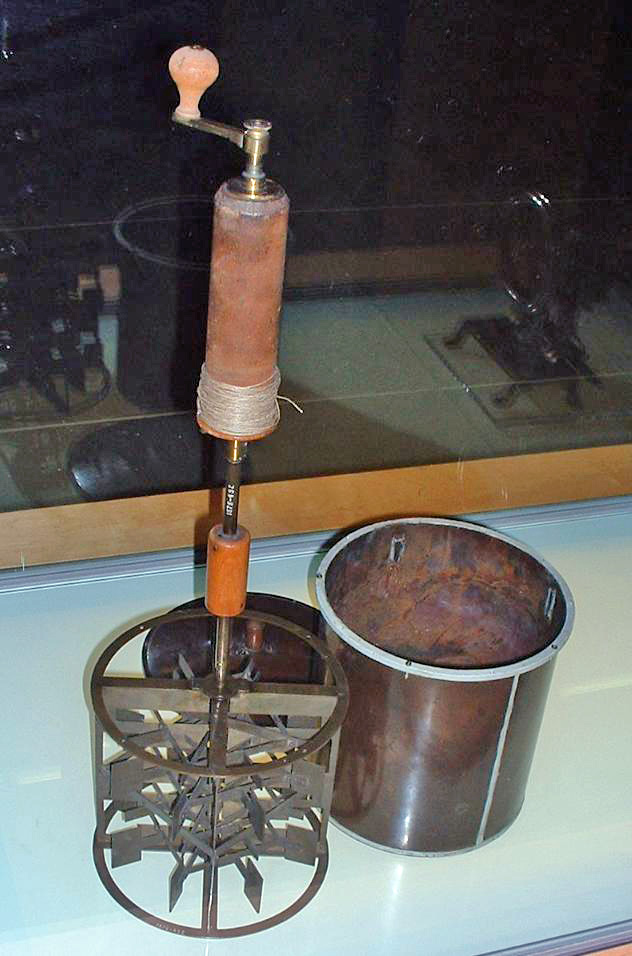
Joule's Heat Apparatus, 1845

In 1850, Joule published a refined measurement of 772.692 foot-pounds force per British thermal unit (4.155 J/cal), closer to twentieth century estimates.

== Reception and priority ==
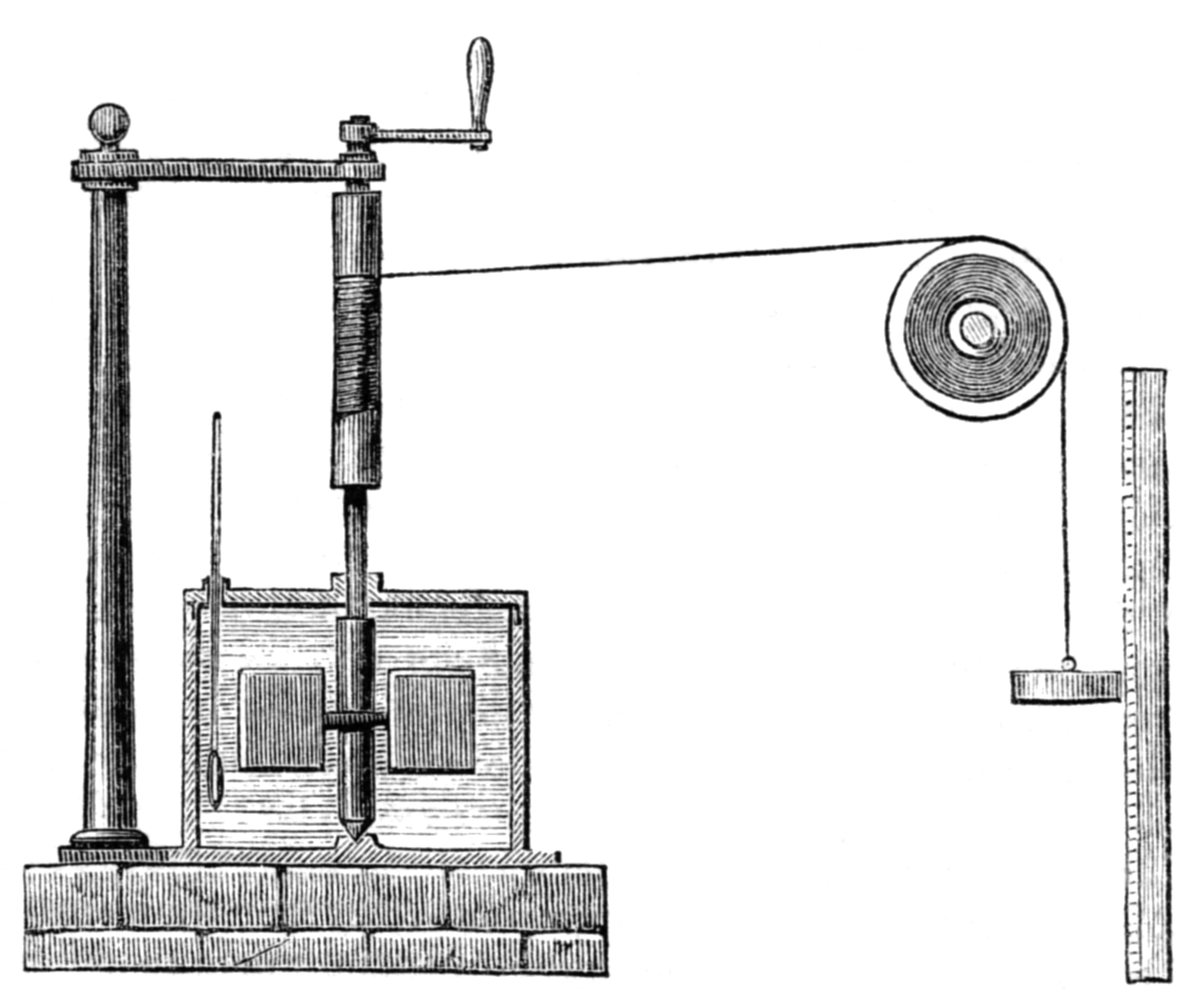
Joule's apparatus for measuring the mechanical equivalent of heat

Much of the initial resistance to Joule's work stemmed from its dependence upon extremely precise measurements. He claimed to be able to measure temperatures to within 1/200 of a degree Fahrenheit (3 mK). Such precision was certainly uncommon in contemporary experimental physics but his doubters may have neglected his experience in the art of brewing and his access to its practical technologies. He was also ably supported by scientific instrument-maker John Benjamin Dancer. Joule's experiments complemented the theoretical work of Rudolf Clausius, who is considered by some to be the coinventor of the energy concept.

Joule was proposing a kinetic theory of heat (he believed it to be a form of rotational, rather than translational, kinetic energy), and this required a conceptual leap: if heat was a form of molecular motion, why did the motion of the molecules not gradually die out? Joule's ideas required one to believe that the collisions of molecules were perfectly elastic. Importantly, the very existence of atoms and molecules was not widely accepted for another 50 years, though the essential work on the existence of molecules, atoms and electrons was underway throughout the 19th and early 20th centuries, from that of John Dalton through to Ernest Rutherford. A collection of Dalton’s works was published in 1893, 49 years after his death.

Although it may be hard today to understand the allure of the caloric theory, at the time it seemed to have some clear advantages. Carnot's successful theory of heat engines had also been based on the caloric assumption, and only later was it proved by Lord Kelvin that Carnot's mathematics were equally valid without assuming a caloric fluid.

However, in Germany, Hermann Helmholtz became aware both of Joule's work and the similar 1842 work of Julius Robert von Mayer. Though both men had been neglected since their respective publications, Helmholtz's definitive 1847 declaration of the conservation of energy credited them both.

Also in 1847, another of Joule's presentations at the British Association in Oxford was attended by George Gabriel Stokes, Michael Faraday, and the precocious and maverick William Thomson, later to become Lord Kelvin, who had just been appointed professor of natural philosophy at the University of Glasgow. Stokes was "inclined to be a Joulite" and Faraday was "much struck with it" though he harboured doubts. Thomson was intrigued but sceptical.

Unanticipated, Thomson and Joule met later that year in Chamonix. Joule married Amelia Grimes on 18 August and the couple went on honeymoon. Marital enthusiasm notwithstanding, Joule and Thomson arranged to attempt an experiment a few days later to measure the temperature difference between the top and bottom of the Cascade de Sallanches waterfall, though this subsequently proved impractical.

Though Thomson felt that Joule's results demanded theoretical explanation, he retreated into a spirited defence of the Carnot–Clapeyron school. In his 1848 account of absolute temperature, Thomson wrote that "the conversion of heat (or caloric) into mechanical effect is probably impossible, certainly undiscovered" – but a footnote signalled his first doubts about the caloric theory, referring to Joule's "very remarkable discoveries". Surprisingly, Thomson did not send Joule a copy of his paper but when Joule eventually read it he wrote to Thomson on 6 October, claiming that his studies had demonstrated conversion of heat into work but that he was planning further experiments. Thomson replied on the 27th, revealing that he was planning his own experiments and hoping for a reconciliation of their two views. Though Thomson conducted no new experiments, over the next two years he became increasingly dissatisfied with Carnot's theory and convinced of Joule's. In his 1851 paper, Thomson was willing to go no further than a compromise and declared "the whole theory of the motive power of heat is founded on two propositions, due respectively to Joule, and to Carnot and Clausius".

As soon as Joule read the paper he wrote to Thomson with his comments and questions. Thus began a fruitful, though largely epistolary, collaboration between the two men, Joule conducting experiments, Thomson analysing the results and suggesting further experiments. The collaboration lasted from 1852 to 1856, its discoveries including the Joule–Thomson effect, and the published results did much to bring about general acceptance of Joule's work and the kinetic theory.

== Kinetic theory ==
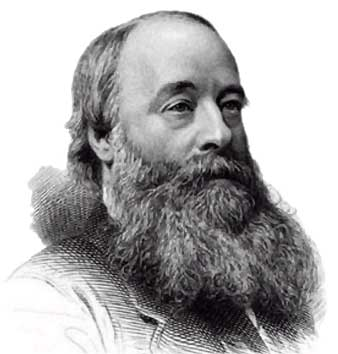
James Prescott Joule

Kinetics is the science of motion. Joule was a pupil of Dalton and it is no surprise that he had learned a firm belief in the atomic theory, even though there were many scientists of his time who were still skeptical. He had also been one of the few people receptive to the neglected work of John Herapath on the kinetic theory of gases. He was further profoundly influenced by Peter Ewart's 1813 paper "On the measure of moving force".

Joule perceived the relationship between his discoveries and the kinetic theory of heat. His laboratory notebooks reveal that he believed heat to be a form of rotational, rather than translational motion.

Joule could not resist finding antecedents of his views in Francis Bacon, Sir Isaac Newton, John Locke, Benjamin Thompson (Count Rumford) and Sir Humphry Davy. Though such views are justified, Joule went on to estimate a value for the mechanical equivalent of heat of 1,034 foot-pound from Rumford's publications. Some modern writers have criticised this approach on the grounds that Rumford's experiments in no way represented systematic quantitative measurements. In one of his personal notes, Joule contends that Mayer's measurement was no more accurate than Rumford's, perhaps in the hope that Mayer had not anticipated his own work.

Joule has been attributed with explaining the sunset green flash phenomenon in a letter to the Manchester Literary and Philosophical Society in 1869; actually, he noted the last glimpse as bluish green, without attempting to explain the phenomenon.

== Published work ==
- "On the Heat evolved by Metallic Conductors of Electricity, and in the Cells of a Battery during Electrolysis". Philosophical Magazine. 19 (124): 260. 1841. doi:10.1080/14786444108650416.
- "On the Calorific Effects of Magneto-Electricity, and on the Mechanical Value of Heat". Philosophical Magazine. 3. 23 (154): 435–443. 1843. doi:10.1080/14786444308644766.
- "On the Changes of Temperature Produced by the Rarefaction and Condensation of Air". Proceedings of the Royal Society of London. 5: 517–518. 1844. doi:10.1098/rspl.1843.0031.
- "On the Changes of Temperature Produced by the Rarefaction and Condensation of Air". Philosophical Magazine. 3. 26 (174): 369–383. 1845. doi:10.1080/14786444508645153.
- "On the Mechanical Equivalent of Heat". Notices and Abstracts of Communications to the British Association for the Advancement of Science. 15. 1845b. Read before the British Association at Cambridge, June 1845.
- "On the Existence of an Equivalent Relation between Heat and the ordinary Forms of Mechanical Power". Philosophical Magazine. 3. 27 (179): 205–207. 1845c. doi:10.1080/14786444508645256.
- "On the Mechanical Equivalent of Heat". Philosophical Transactions of the Royal Society of London. 140: 61–82. 1850. doi:10.1098/rstl.1850.0004.
- The Scientific Papers of James Prescott Joule. London: Physical Society. 1884. OL 239730M.
- Joint scientific papers. London: Taylor and Francis. 1887.
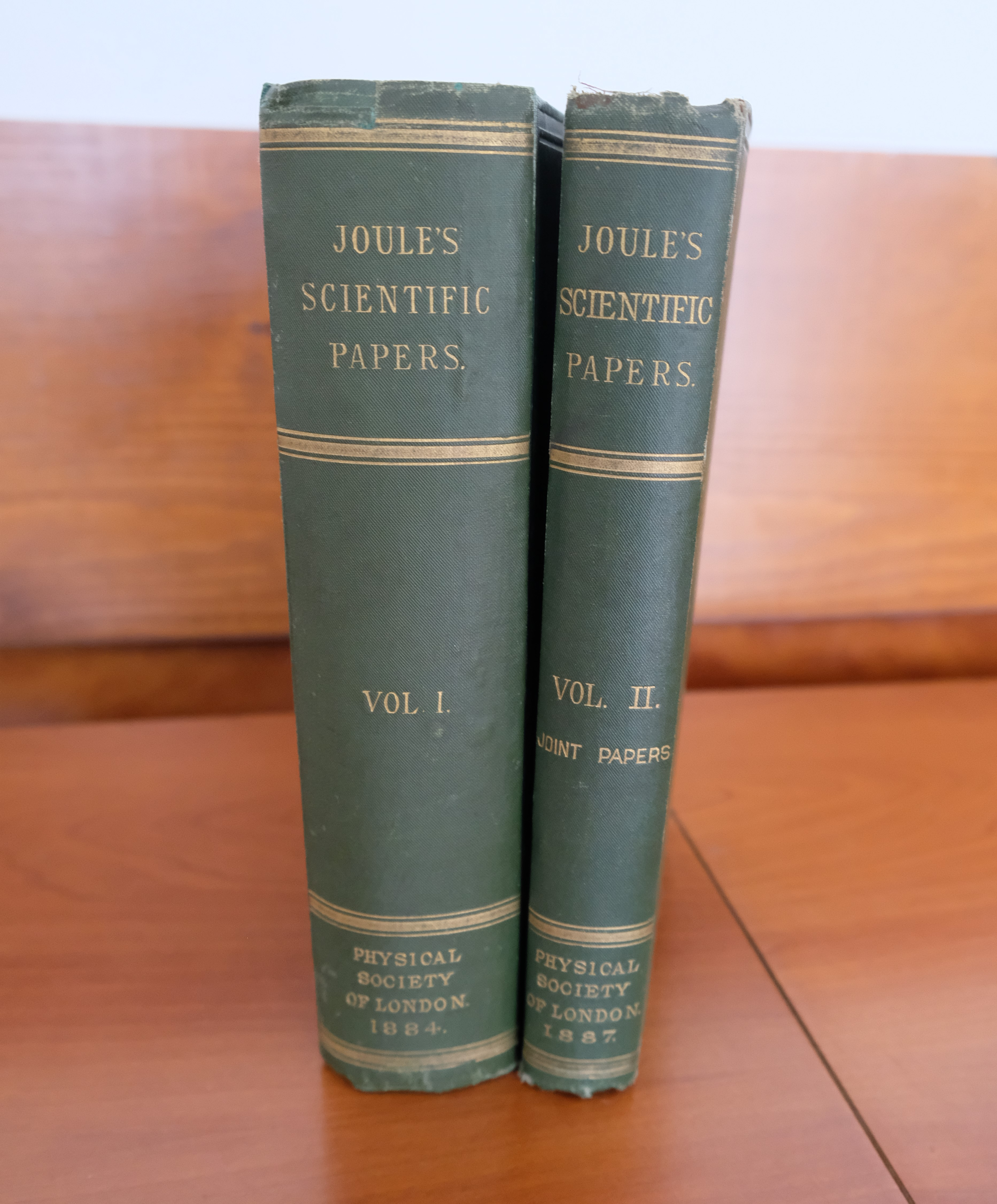
Volumes I and II of "The Scientific Papers"

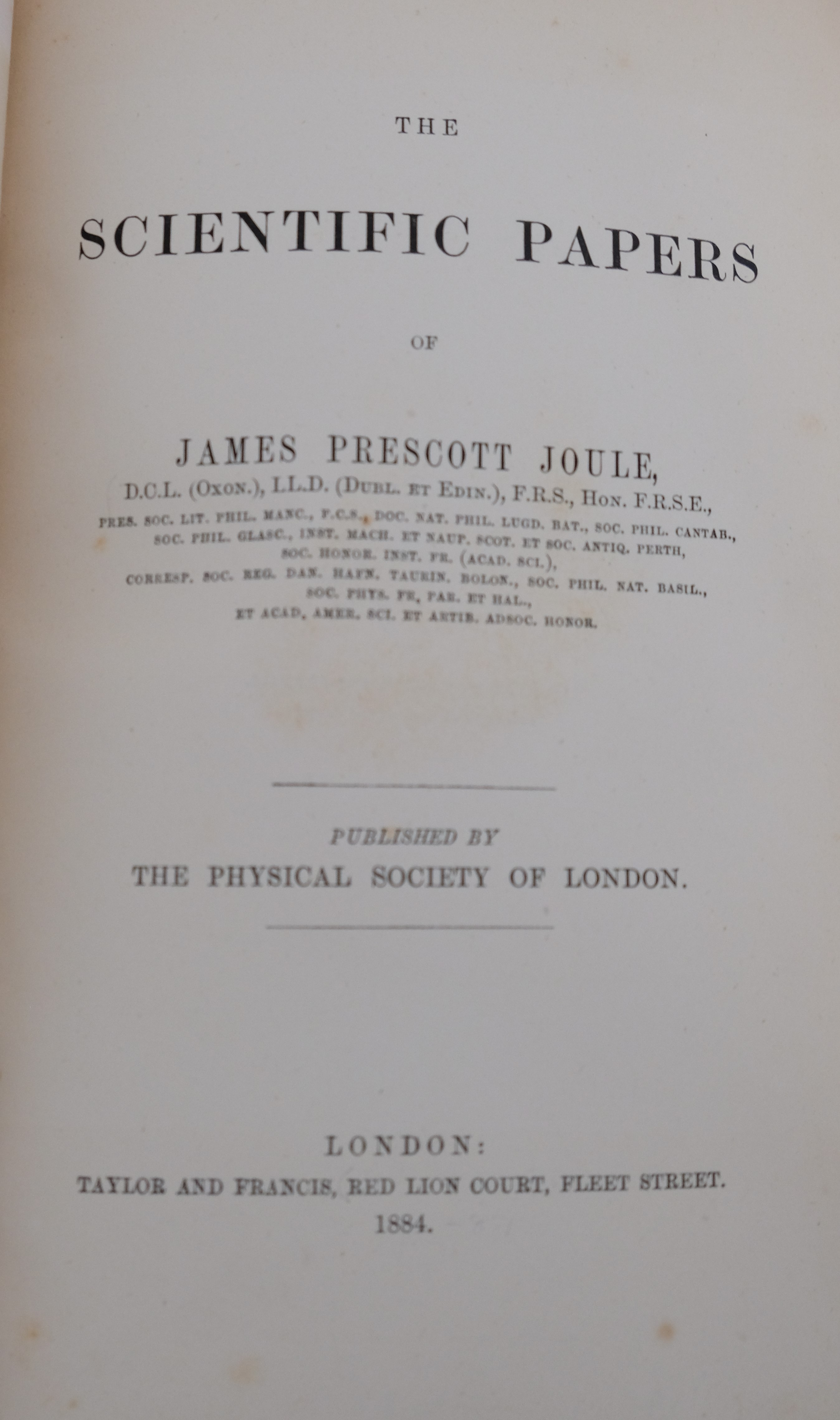
Title page of volume I of "The Scientific Papers"

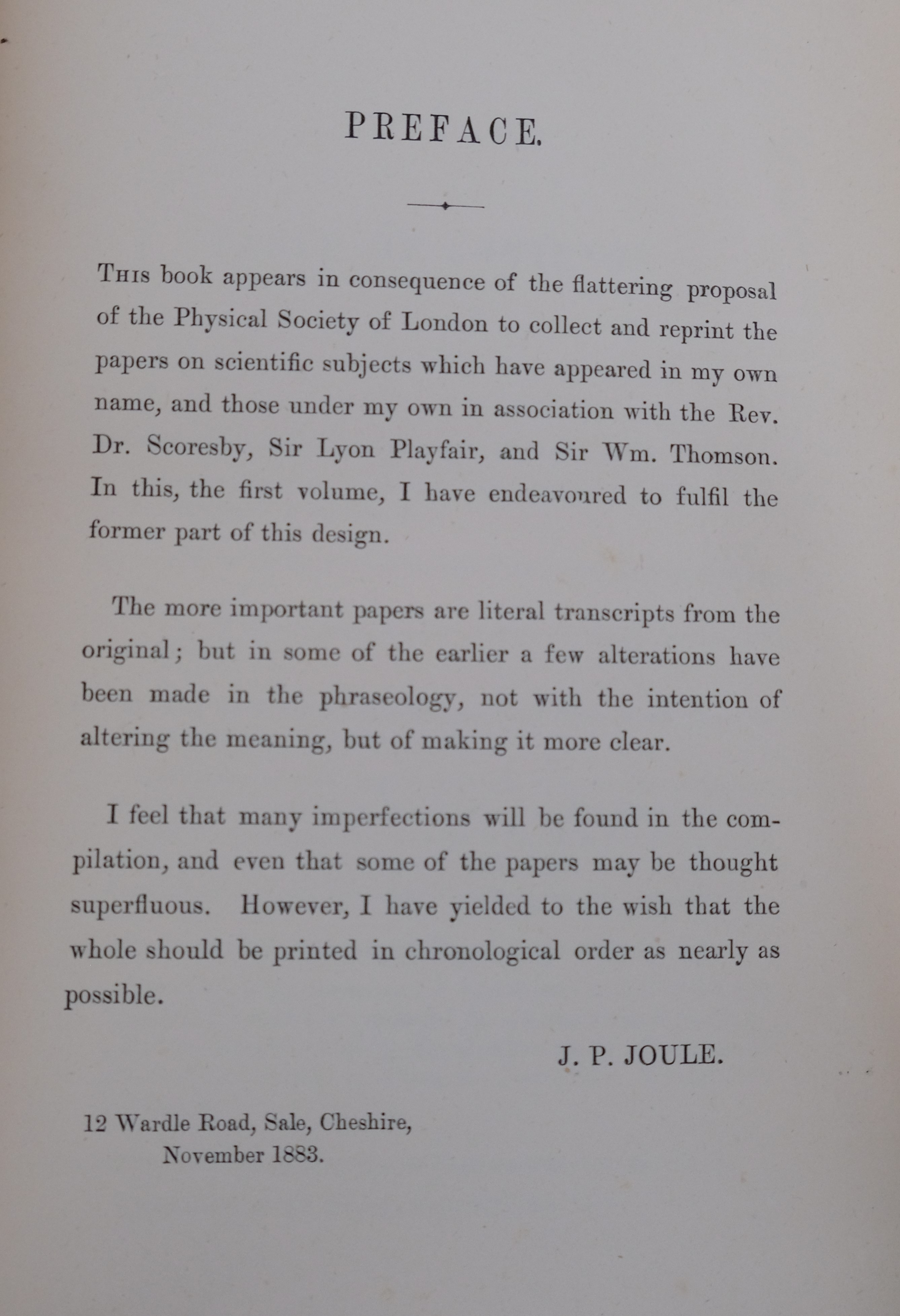
Preface to volume I of "The Scientific Papers"

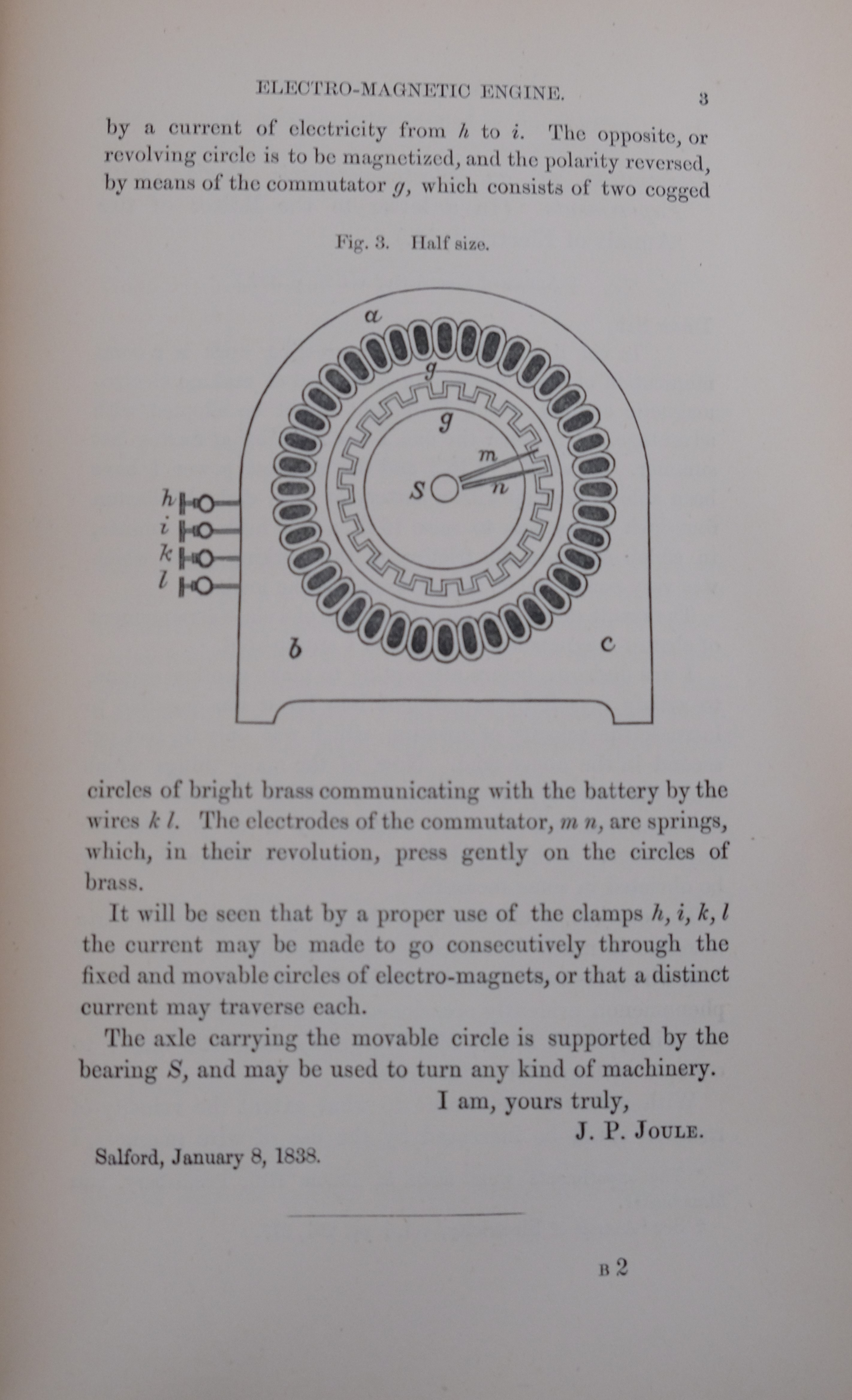
Figure from volume I of "The Scientific Papers"

== Honours ==
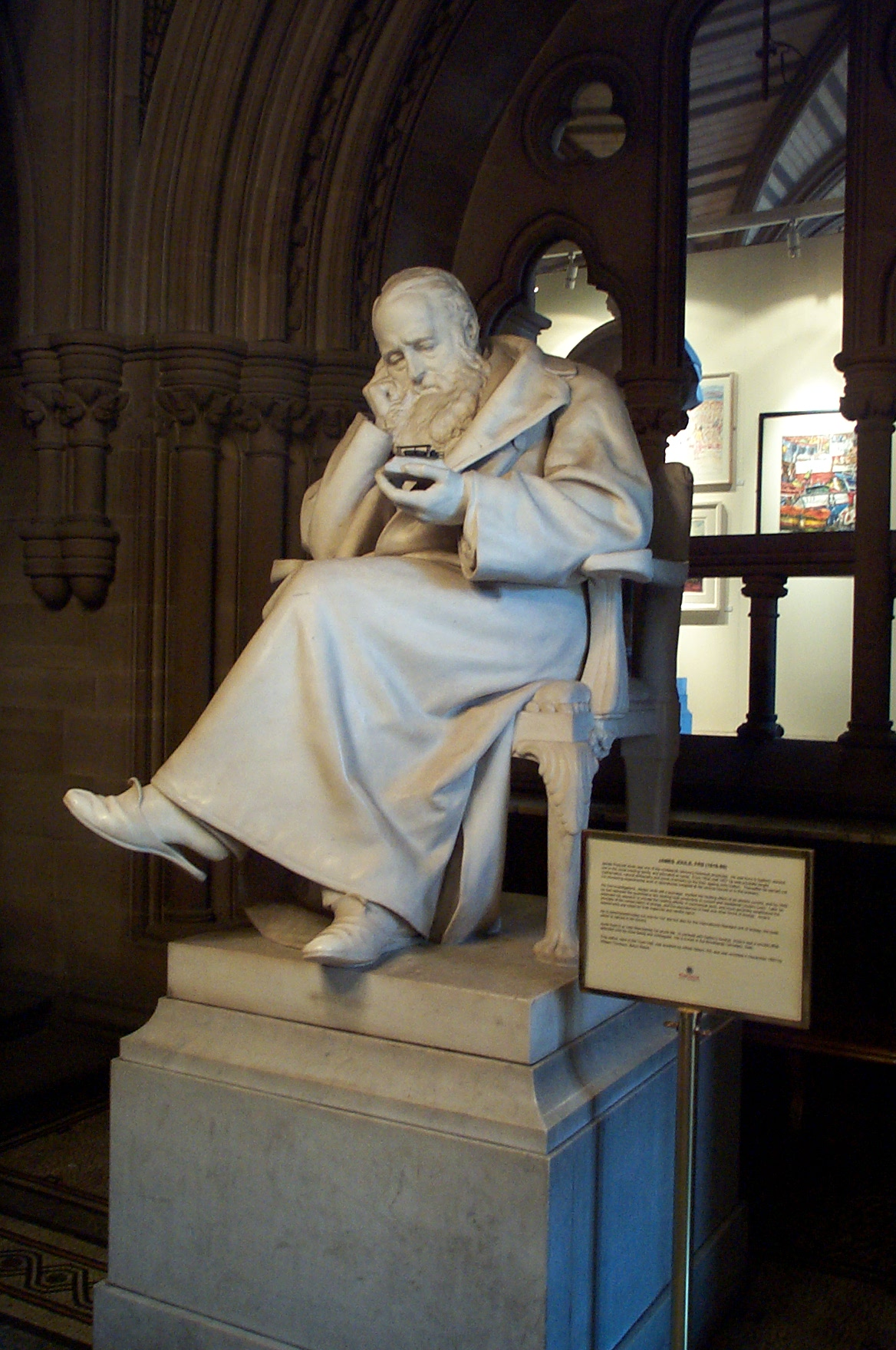
A statue of Joule in the Manchester Town Hall

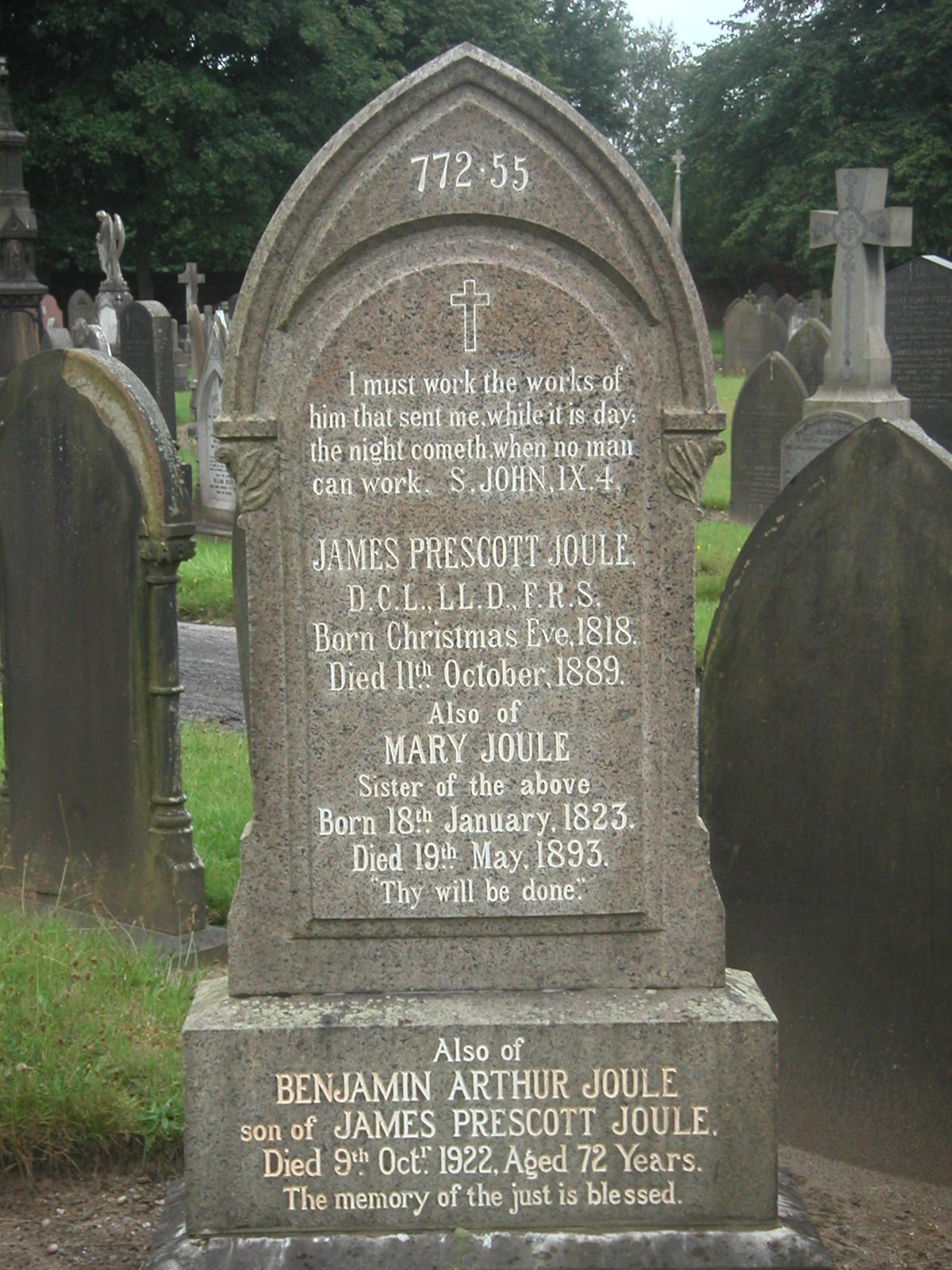
Joule's gravestone in Brooklands cemetery, Sale

Joule died at home in Sale and is buried in Brooklands cemetery there. The Wetherspoons pub in Sale, the town of his death, is named "The J. P. Joule" after him.

Joule's honours and commendations include:

- Fellow of the Royal Society (1850)
  - Royal Medal (1852), 'For his paper on the mechanical equivalent of heat, printed in the Philosophical Transactions for 1850'
  - Copley Medal (1870), 'For his experimental researches on the dynamical theory of heat'
- President of Manchester Literary and Philosophical Society (1860)
- President of the British Association for the Advancement of Science (1872, 1887)
- Honorary Membership of the Institution of Engineers and Shipbuilders in Scotland (1857)
- Honorary degrees:
  - LL.D., Trinity College, Dublin (1857)
  - DCL, University of Oxford (1860)
  - LL.D., University of Edinburgh (1871)
- Joule received a civil list pension of £200 per annum in 1878 for services to science
- Albert Medal of the Royal Society of Arts (1880), 'for having established, after most laborious research, the true relation between heat, electricity and mechanical work, thus affording to the engineer a sure guide in the application of science to industrial pursuits'

There is a memorial to Joule in the north choir aisle of Westminster Abbey, though he is not buried there, contrary to what some biographies state. A statue of Joule by Alfred Gilbert stands in Manchester Town Hall.

== Family ==
Joule married Amelia Grimes in 1847. She died in 1854, seven years after their wedding. They had three children: a son, Benjamin Arthur Joule (1850–1922), a daughter, Alice Amelia (1852–1899), and a second son, Joe (born 1854, died three weeks later).

Professional and academic associations
Preceded by Sir William Fairbairn, Bt	President of the Manchester Literary and Philosophical Society; 1860–62	Succeeded by Edward William Binney
Preceded by Henry Edward Schunck	President of the Manchester Literary and Philosophical Society; 1868–70	Succeeded by Edward William Binney
Preceded by Edward William Binney	President of the Manchester Literary and Philosophical Society; 1872–74	Succeeded by Henry Edward Schunck
Preceded by Edward William Binney	President of the Manchester Literary and Philosophical Society; 1878–80	Succeeded by Edward William Binney
Preceded by John Holt Stanway	Secretary of the Manchester Literary and Philosophical Society; 1846–50	Succeeded by Edward William Binney
