= List of principals of Harris Manchester College, Oxford =

The head of Harris Manchester College, Oxford, is the Principal. This list also includes the heads of the predecessor institutions of the college, Manchester New College and Manchester College, Oxford. Until 1840 the Divinity Tutor was the head of the college.

== Principals of Manchester New College ==
- 1786–1798 Thomas Barnes
- 1798–1803 George Walker
- 1803–1840 Charles Wellbeloved
- 1840–1846 Robert Wallace
- 1846–1850 John Kenrick
- 1850–1853 George Vance Smith
- 1853–1869 John James Tayler
- 1869–1885 James Martineau

== Principals of Manchester College, Oxford ==
- 1885–1906 James Drummond
- 1906–1915 Joseph Estlin Carpenter
- 1915–1931 Lawrence Pearsall Jacks
- 1931–1938 John Henry Weatherall
- 1938–1949 Robert Nichol Cross
- 1951–1956 Sidney Spencer
- 1956–1965 Lancelot Austin Garrard
- 1965–1974 Harry Lismer Short
- 1974–1985 Bruce Findlow
- 1985–1988 Anthony John Cross

== Principals of Harris Manchester College, Oxford ==
- 1988–2018 Ralph Waller
- 2018–2025 Jane Shaw
- 2025–present Beth Breeze
