= John James Tayler =

English Unitarian minister

The Reverend John James Tayler
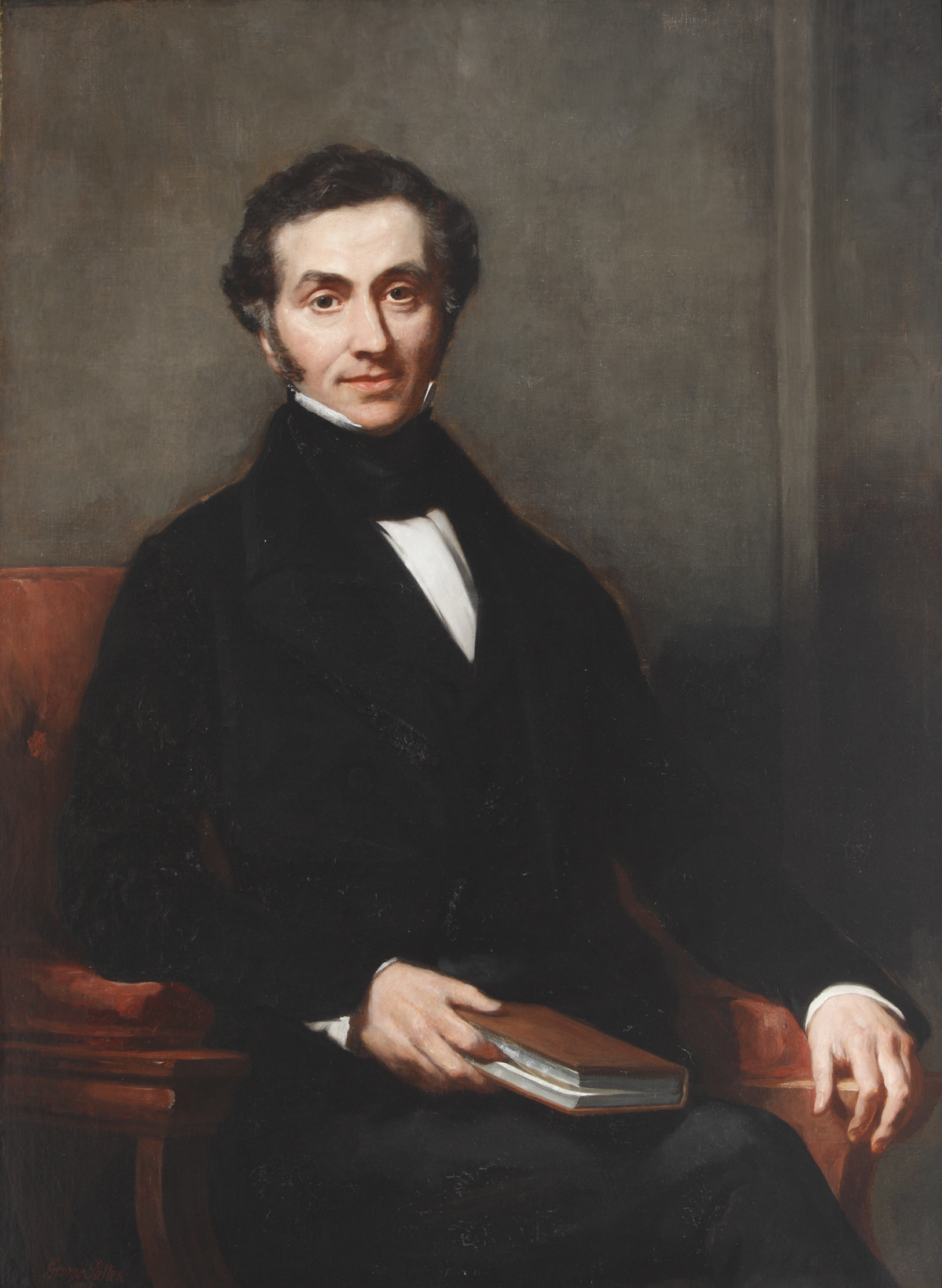
- John James Tayler, 1848 portrait
- Born: 15 August 1797; Newington Butts, Surrey
- Died: 18 May 1869 (aged 71); Hampstead, London
- Education: Manchester College, York; University of Glasgow
- Occupation: Unitarian Minister

John James Tayler (1797–1869) was an English Unitarian Minister.

== Background ==
The eldest son of James Tayler (1765–1831) by his wife Elizabeth (1774–1847), daughter of John Venning of Walthamstow, he was born at 12, Church Row, Newington Butts, in Surrey, on 15 August 1797. His father, was Unitarian minister successively at Walthamstow, Southwark, and Nottingham; and made him a Latinist. Tayler's father, following the death of his father, Richard Tayler (†1784), himself a non-conformist minister, was adopted by Andrew Kippis (1725–1795), editor of the Biographia Britannica (1778) who assumed the role of guardian and tutor and helped him about 1788 enter New College at Hackney (where, Kippis was appointed one of the tutors, together with Richard Price, Joseph Priestley, and Gilbert Wakefield). Tayler wrote in his obituary of his father, that "domestic occurrences" had prevented him from completing his course at Hackney and he continued his studies in private, under the direction of Dr. Kippis. "At the recommendation of Kippis he officiated at Nottingham, as a supply, for several months, in 1793 or 1794; after which he preached for some time at Walthamstow, where in 1795, he married Elizabeth, daughter of Mr. John Venning, of that place. In the beginning of 1797, he succeeded the Rev. Thomas Jervis, as sole minister of St. Thomas's Meeting-house, Southwark."

At Hackney his classical tutor was Gilbert Wakefield (1756–1801), and Tayler attributed his father's "exact and solid knowledge" of the Greek and Latin languages to Wakefield's influence. Tayler's father also "took a lively interest in the discoveries of natural philosophy; and works on chemistry and physiology". In 1802 his father moved to Nottingham as one of the Ministers of the High Pavement Chapel a post he held until 1831.

In the spring of 1808 his father started a school situated in his own home. Tayler refers to "the expenses of a large and increasing family" as the main reason for doing so- Tayler had two brothers, Andrew and William and three sisters Emily, Elizabeth and Clara. It was this first schooling that had a profound effect on him, and it was his father's pronounced "philological habits" that "led to a scrupulous and anxious habit of mind in matters of minute accuracy" that made a deep and lasting impression on the young Tayler who was closely taught by his father.

== Education ==
Manchester College, York

In September 1814 he entered Manchester College, York, then under the triumvirate of Charles Wellbeloved (1769–1858) the principal, William Turner (1788–1853) tutor in mathematics and philosophy and John Kenrick (1788–1877) tutor in classics and history. After his father, probably the greatest influence on the young Tayler was Kenrick. His father, at first sceptical of Manchester College, took a very keen interest and closely watched his education at York, personally negotiating with Kenrick about the structure of some of his sons lessons. By March 1816, he was already aware of the plans his father had made for him to study at the University of Glasgow, "It is now determined that my father—intends me to spend my next session at Glasgow, before I enter in my third year here."

University of Glasgow

From November 1816 at Glasgow University it was a further triumvirate of teachers, George Jardine (1742–1827) professor of logic, John Young (1750?–1820), professor of Greek, the so-called 'Pseudo-Johnson', and the philosopher James Mylne (1757–1839) who influenced him. His correspondence at this time with his childhood friend, the Persian scholar Samuel Robinson (1794–1894), who would later translate Friedrich Schiller's Wilhelm Tell (1824), reveal details of the lectures. Following his graduation as B.A. at Glasgow he returned to Manchester College, York, and as early as November 1818 he was made aware of John Kenrick's "wish to spend a complete year abroad at some German university"

== Career ==
Classical Tutor at Manchester College, York

He was appointed classical tutor at York (1819–1820) as Kenrick's substitute. During this time he was "thinking of becoming a physician as well as a dissenting minister” receiving an undisclosed offer from his friend the economist and antiquary, Robert Hyde Greg (1795–1875). Later that year he visited Edinburgh (where it appears he met Thomas Southwood Smith (1788–1861) the Unitarian minister who had also studied medicine, and graduated MD in 1816. By August 1820 whilst visiting George William Wood (1781–1843) at Platt, near Manchester, the questioning of combining the two subjects had moved on to a simple choice between the two. Dr.Peter Mark Roget, the physician and lexicographer, and Dr.William Henry, both advised Tayler against the choice of medicine.

Mosley Street Unitarian Chapel, Manchester 1821

The position at Mosley Street Unitarian chapel, Manchester was facilitated for him, and on 4 October 1820 Tayler became minister, in succession to William Hawkes (1759–1820), at Mosley Street Chapel, Manchester, where he was ordained on 20 April 1821. It was not a difficult choice moving to Manchester (lodging at first as a guest at John Gooch Robberds' (1789–1854) home). Manchester was a place, he wrote "where the Dissenters enjoy a degree of weight and respectability above any other part of the kingdom, and where some of them are men most distinguished for science and literature, and who consequently would form most valuable associates for a young man eager for intellectual improvement." It was upon Mosley Street Chapel's sixty-eight pews, that the elite of Manchester's commercial and industrial middle class sat listening to him. He was elected a member of the Manchester Literary and Philosophical Society on 26 January 1821. Later that year he met Thomas Belsham (1750–1829) in August 1821. He also took private lessons in Classics, History, belles Lettres, at No. 7, Dickenson-Street, to supplement his income. In April 1822, Tayler began a series of lectures at the rooms of the Manchester Literary and Philosophical Society, George-Street, entitled On the Rise and Progress of our National Poetry.

== With Wordsworth in the Lake District ==
In July 1826 July Tayler met William Wordsworth in the Lake District (Ambleside, Rydal). In July 1830 he wrote to his wife "I am solacing myself with Wordsworth. Do you know I shall become a thorough convert to him. Much of his poetry is delicious, and I perfectly adore his philosophy. To me he seems the purest, the most elevated and the most Christian of poets. I delight in his deep and tender piety, and his spirit of exquisite sympathy with whatever is lovely and grand in the breathing universe around us." In September 1827 Tayler contemplated applying as a candidate for the professorship of the English language and literature in the newly founded London University (University College London) that would acquire the nickname 'The Godless Institution of Gower Street'.

== The 'apologist of infidelity' ==
Tayler delivered a radical sermon "On Communion with Unbelievers" on 30 March 1828 that acquired some notoriety, The Manchester Chronicle (5 April) branded him an "apologist of infidelity" and the clerical establishment in the pages of The Congregational Magazine described him as the "arch-fiend", who in proposing to welcome Free-thinkers into his church had revealed "the hideous and malignant features of the apostate spirit". At the beginning of May 1831, the tragic news of the loss of his brother Andrew at sea, en route to Calcutta, hastily brought on his father's death some weeks later on 15 May. At the time of his father's funeral (at which John Kentish, a fellow student from New College, Hackney, gave a sermon), Tayler was also approached to become the minister of the New Meeting Congregation at Birmingham, a position which he turned down.

Tayler's name repeatedly appears in the Intelligence sections of Unitarian periodicals and for nearly thirty years he was actively involved in innumerable social and reform activities in Manchester and regularly attended meetings. The Manchester Ministry to the Poor; Manchester District Sunday-School Association; The Lancashire and Cheshire Presbyterian Association and the British and Foreign Unitarian Association (BFUA), founded in 1825. He was a member of the Manchester Athenaeum, and he was also closely involved with the Royal Manchester Institution. In February 1846 he submitted a plan for "rationalizing and organizing the lecture programme" at the Royal Manchester Institution which the RMI Council approved of and instituted the following year. He was a member of the Chetham Society and regularly used its library and he was a member of the Philological Society. He was a member of the British Association for the Advancement of Science. He sustained his ministry in Manchester for 33 years, moving his congregation (1 September 1839) to Upper Brook Street Chapel, a magnificent building designed by Sir Charles Barry, and the first specimen of Gothic architecture built for Unitarians.

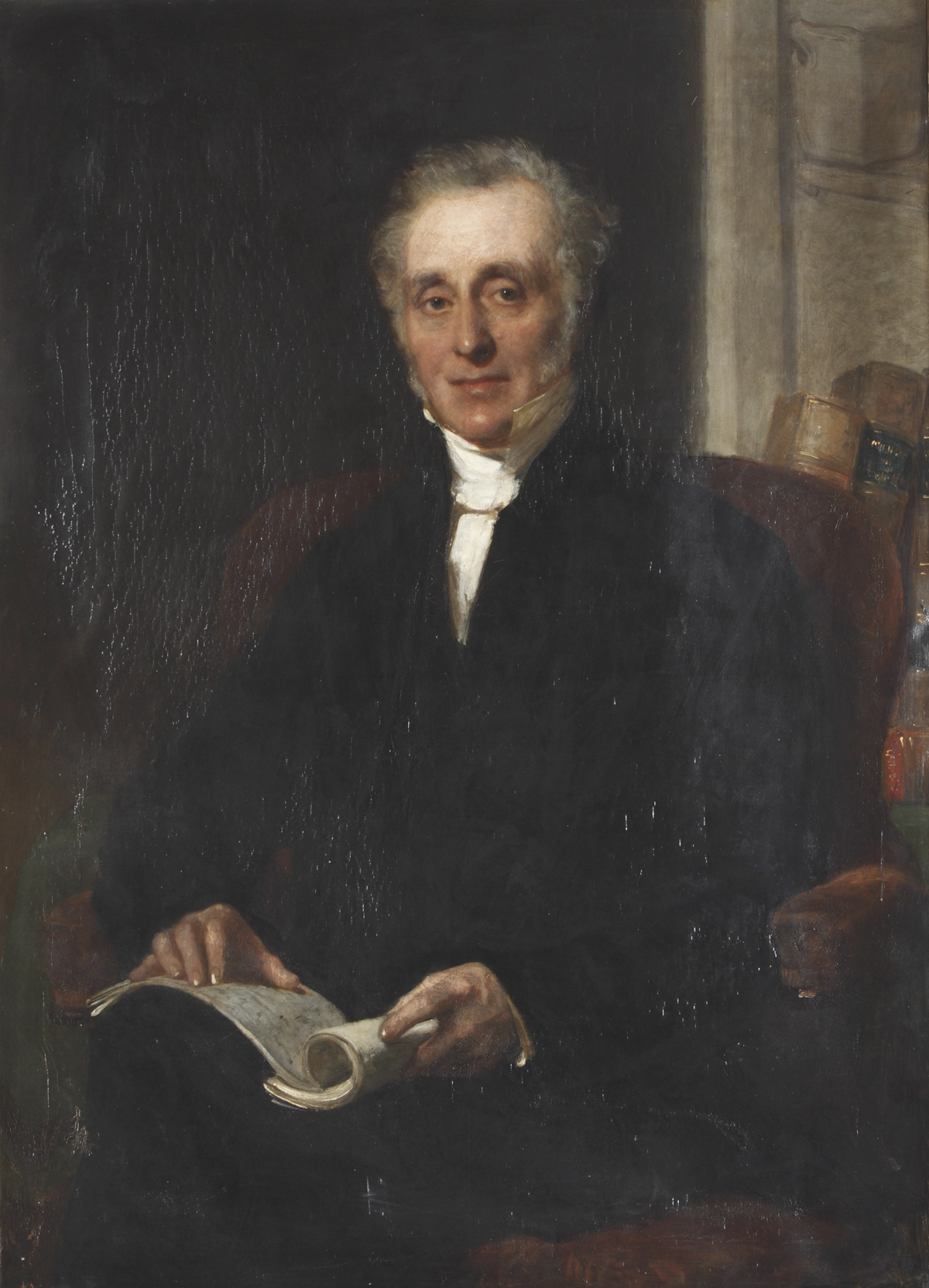
John James Tayler, 1863 portrait

Tayler had begun to study German at Manchester College, York as early as 1815, he was probably encouraged by Kenrick who later actually taught German at York. By February 1823 there is confirmation of his competence in German in a letter to his uncle Richard Tayler: "I have so far mastered German, as to be able to read the language with pleasure, and can use my knowledge of it profitably in referring to difficult books, connected with my other studies". In 1830 he published two articles on the German philosopher and theologian Johann Gottfried Herder (1744–1803) in the Monthly Repository Some Account of the Life and Writings of Herder, two years later he published four articles entitled Herder's Thoughts on the Philosophy of the History of Mankind. In these articles, Tayler had translated passages from almost all of the twenty books of Herder's major work the Ideen zur Philosophie der Geschichte der Menschheit, blissfully unaware of Thomas Otton Churchill's earlier translation from 1800. His study and knowledge of Herder's works, following Samuel Taylor Coleridge (1772–1834), William Taylor of Norwich (1765–1836), Thomas De Quincey (1785–1859) and his close personal friend Henry Crabb Robinson (1775–1867), was probably the most wide-ranging in England of the nineteenth century. He is one of Herder's most important and neglected English interpreters of the 19th century.

== Travel and Study in Germany 1834–35 ==
In 1834–35 Tayler spent a year in Germany travelling together with his family, studying at first at the University of Göttingen, here Tayler met the two leading intellectual figures in the theological faculty: Gottfried Christian Friedrich Lücke (1791–1855) and Johann Karl Ludwig Gieseler (1792–1854). He regularly attended Lücke's seminars "four afternoons in the week on the Kritik and Hermeneutik of the New Testament" as well as a lecture of Gieseler's on Ecclesiastical History every morning, except Sundays." He also attended the lectures and seminars of Heinrich Ewald (1803–1875). "At two I go to another lecture, on the Archaeology of the Old Testament and the History of the Jews by Professor Ewald. I am exceedingly pleased with Ewald and his lectures.—he was a favourite pupil of the late Eichhorn's, whose department he now fills..." At Göttingen he also went to the early morning lectures of Johann Friedrich Blumenbach (1752–1840) and spoke highly of his daughter who "has been very kind in her attentions to us." Georg Friedrich Benecke (1762–1844)- who had taught Coleridge German when he was at Göttingen (September 1798- July 1799)- introduced Tayler to Karl Otfried Müller (1797–1840) professor of ancient literature. Tayler heard him lecture on Greek antiquities in the morning followed by his lectures on Pindar. Afterwards, Tayler often walked with his wife, sister and the children at midday when they all had dinner"

Early 1835 he studied at the University of Bonn, where he and his family lodged at the house of the historian and philosopher Christian August Brandis (1790–1867), who had been the close friend of Friedrich Schleiermacher (1768–1834) and Barthold Georg Niebuhr(1776–1831). He attended his lectures on Greek philosophy. He met Georg Benjamin Mendelssohn (1794–1874), the grandson of Moses Mendelssohn, a Privatdozent who was lecturing on ancient and modern geography. At Bonn he attended lectures on early Roman history by August Wilhelm Schlegel (1767–1845), seminars presided over by the theologian Karl Immanuel Nitzsch (1787–1868); also courses given by Friedrich Gottlieb Welcker (1784–1868), the German philologist, archaeologist and librarian- who at this time was giving a course on the interpretation of paintings and bas-reliefs, "illustrative of the Epic cyclus of ancient fable." He heard Johann Christian Wilhelm Augusti (1771–1841) known for his 'Der kleine Koran' (1798) and who together with Wilhelm Martin Leberecht de Wette had published a new translation of the Old Testament (1809), as well as Johann Martin Augustin Scholz (1794–1852), professor of theology in the Catholic faculty, who was preparing a new edition of the Greek Testament."To most of these excellent men," at Bonn, Tayler wrote afterwards, he was indebted "for the kind attentions and many hours of valuable instruction...".

He met many leading theologians, philosophers and historians and he wrote a series of letters addressed to his Mosley-street congregation in Manchester about his on-going studies and travels. On his return he published in the Unitarian The Christian Teacher in six parts, his Retrospect of a Twelvemonth Passed in Germany (1836). Their lively anecdotal form coupled with profound insights into "the German mind", enthused other Unitarians-including many of his students- to follow the same route to Germany. "Trinitarianism" he wrote, "so far at least as the distinct personality of the Holy Spirit is concerned, is very generally given up by the most learned divines in Germany":

== Manchester College and return to Manchester 1840 ==
In 1840 Manchester College was moved from York back to Manchester (its place of origin), under the name of Manchester New College, and Tayler became professor of ecclesiastical history. He held also a theological professorship from 1852. At a Meeting of the Trustees (25 May 1853) he was asked to accept the offices of Principal and Professor of Ecclesiastical History. Manchester New College transferred to London in connexion with University College at University Hall, and was thus affiliated to the University of London for the next 13 years. Tayler had hoped for an arrangement "which would enable me to reside permanently in Manchester, and yet preserve my connection with the College as a Lecturer, for a term every session; and more than one overture have I made to that effect." But this did not transpire, Tayler and his family moved to London and lived at 22, Woburn Square, for the next seven years, within easy reach of the college in Gordon Square. He delivered his inaugural address at University Hall, London, on Friday 14 October.; from 1857 he ran the whole of the theological department, apart from religious philosophy and Hebrew.

Probably influenced by his friend and colleague Francis William Newman (1805–1897), Tayler's engagement for abolitionist and nationalist causes was considerable. In June 1850 he had given a "Speech on the Question of American Slavery" at Altrincham, in Cheshire, later that year in November 1850 Tayler set up a 'Hungarian Fund' and shows himself politically engaged for Magyar exiles resident in Manchester. The secretary of Lajos Kossuth(1802–1894) had asked Tayler to "get up a Memorial" for the deliverance of Kossuth and his companions from their confinement in Turkey. Tayler writes: "Our Hungarian friends are dispirited; Kossuth and his companions are dying by inches of hardship." By February 1851 Tayler's Hungarian memorial with some 800 names was eventually presented to Lord Palmerston by Thomas Milner-Gibson (1806–1884), the latter who "was cold and cautious, and not very encouraging" In July Tayler was on the platform at a public meeting held in the Town Hall, Manchester on the captivity of Kossuth, and gave an impassioned speech. Indeed, Tayler understood the nationalist struggles of Kossuth and the Italian Giuseppe Mazzini(1805–1872) and their writings as "the earnest and impassioned eloquence of the most energetic assertors of freedom and progress" – here was also the presence of a religious element, not "the work and conventional phraseology of a church or sect, but deep and thrilling undertones...caught from the inspiration of prophets and apostles of an older day" Kossuth and Mazzini were "breathing the living spirit of Christ". This was inescapably a form of political theology that wholeheartedly embraced nationalism. And when Tayler claimed that Kossuth and Mazzini were currently: "promoting the moral and spiritual advancement of the human race", it was too much for other Unitarians, the Rev. B. Mardon at a meeting of the Trustees objected strongly to Tayler's politicisation of his lectures. On 27 April 1855 he delivered a lecture addressed to the Secularists at the Literary Institution, John Street, Fitzroy Square, London, obtaining praise from George Holyoake (1817–1906)

From 1853 Tayler was a trustee of Dr. Williams's foundations. In October 1854–55 Tayler taught a course in Moral Philosophy at Bedford-square Ladies' College, London, founded in 1849 by Elizabeth Jesser Reid (1789–1866) who Tayler had known since 1838.

== Further Travel and Study in Germany 1856–62 ==
In 1856 Tayler visited Heidelberg in Germany where he met amongst others, Baron Christian Charles Josias von Bunsen, the historian Friedrich Christoph Schlosser and the theologian David Friedrich Strauss (1808–1874), the author of Das Leben Jesu, a work that Tayler wrote "which shook the whole Theological World like an earthquake, though it was only an explosion of elements that had long been fermenting under Hegelian influence in the school of Tübingen, and might therefore have been predicted." He documented a further historical account of the transformation of theology in Germany in three articles Letters on Religion in Germany. Written from Heidelberg (1856). Once again in Germany in the summer of July–August 1857 he spent part of his holidays at Düsternbrook, Kiel, and visited the university where he met the philologist Georg Curtius (1820–1885), the classical geographer Peter Wilhelm Forchhammer (1801–1894) who presented Tayler with a monograph of his on Achilles; Madame Dorothea Hensler (née Behrens) the friend of Niebuhr― she was the sister of his first wife― as well as the theologian Dr. Carl Peter Matthias Lüdermann. He praised the university library pursuing his studies very diligently working "every morning till dinner". In 1858 he attended the 300th anniversary celebration of the founding of the University of Jena. In 1862, accompanied by his daughter Hannah, Tayler was again in Germany, Thuringia, Leipzig, Dresden and Coburg. At Koblenz, he slept at the hotel Zum Weissen Ross at Ehrenbreitstein- in the identical rooms he and his wife had taken back in 1835. He spent the summer months at Bad Liebenstein in the Thuringian forest (six weeks) with excursions to Wilhelmsthal, near Eisenach, and visits to Coburg, Hof and Leipzig. In Leipzig he met Constantin von Tischendorf (1815–1874), who showed him the original codex Sinaiticus, he also made a tour of Brockhaus the publishers.

During 1859–60, after the death of Edward Tagart, he was one of the ministers of Little Portland Street chapel, together with James Martineau in what was called a "joint pastorship". Henry Crabb Robinson was an attendant. On 9 February 1858, a deputation of English Presbyterian Ministers of London and Westminster, presented an address of congratulation to Queen Victoria at Buckingham Palace, on the occasion of the dynastic marriage (25. 1. 1858) of the Princess Royal, Victoria Adelaide Mary Louisa (1840–1901) to Prince Frederick William of Prussia (1831–1888). Tayler personally addressed Prince Albert of Saxe-Coburg-Gotha (1819–1861). A few days later Tayler waited on the Prussian ambassador, Count Albrecht von Bernstorff (1809–1873), to deliver a spirited Anglo-German address to the married couple. Throughout July–August 1859, Tayler was with his family in the Lake District; he attended at Rydal Mount the sale auction of Wordsworth's books (primarily to buy books for Henry Crabb Robinson); on 14 August he climbed Skiddaw mountain (3,054 ft; 931 m) and Tayler and his daughter Hannah were involved in a serious road accident (26 August). From May to June 1860 Tayler was seriously ill— a weak and sensitive stomach, with frequent feelings of nausea— at Heathside Cottage, Northend, Hampstead. In October, together with his wife, who was also poorly, they were convalescing at Eastbourne, Sussex, he wrote that he was still recovering having "swallowed enough of quinine, iodine and nitric acid during the last two months to disorder one's natural system completely." In what was one of the coldest Decembers in London (at Hyde Park it had measured −17C ) he announced his retirement from Little Portland Street Unitarian chapel. He visited the Netherlands(University of Leyden) and Belgium in 1867. Tayler was present at the meeting at Sion College (15 February 1868) where the Dean of Westminster, Arthur Penrhyn Stanley (1815–1881) gave his lecture on The Connection of Church and State.

== Journey to Transylvania ==
In April 1868 Tayler received an invitation to attend the approaching tercentenary of the Unitarian Church in Transylvania (The oldest Unitarian community in Europe, was at Thorla in Transylvania) and at the age of seventy-one he left London (accompanied by his daughter) on 30 June, bound for Transylvania "proceeding by Brussels, Cologne, Coblentz, [through Würtzburg and Bamberg]and Heidelberg.He continued via Vienna, Budapest, Klausenburg and in August was in Gyéres. On his way to Transylvania, writing from the Frankische Schweitz we possess a Unitarian credo of Catholic spirit, some eight months before his death, where Tayler revealed himself a follower of Richard Baxter (1615–1691) a 'Baxterian', thankful for having been born and bred into a Presbyterian Church "which has never made anything fundamental in Christianity, but the spirit of Christ himself" he wrote to his friend James Martineau: ”I consider Baxter to have been the first who introduced the essence of this grand faith, as the bond of all true Church life, into this country; and look on our Presbyterian forefathers, not excluding Priestley and Price, with Dr. Channing and yourself, as his genuine and consistent followers- only developing the germs which he left behind him.”

Death and Commemoration

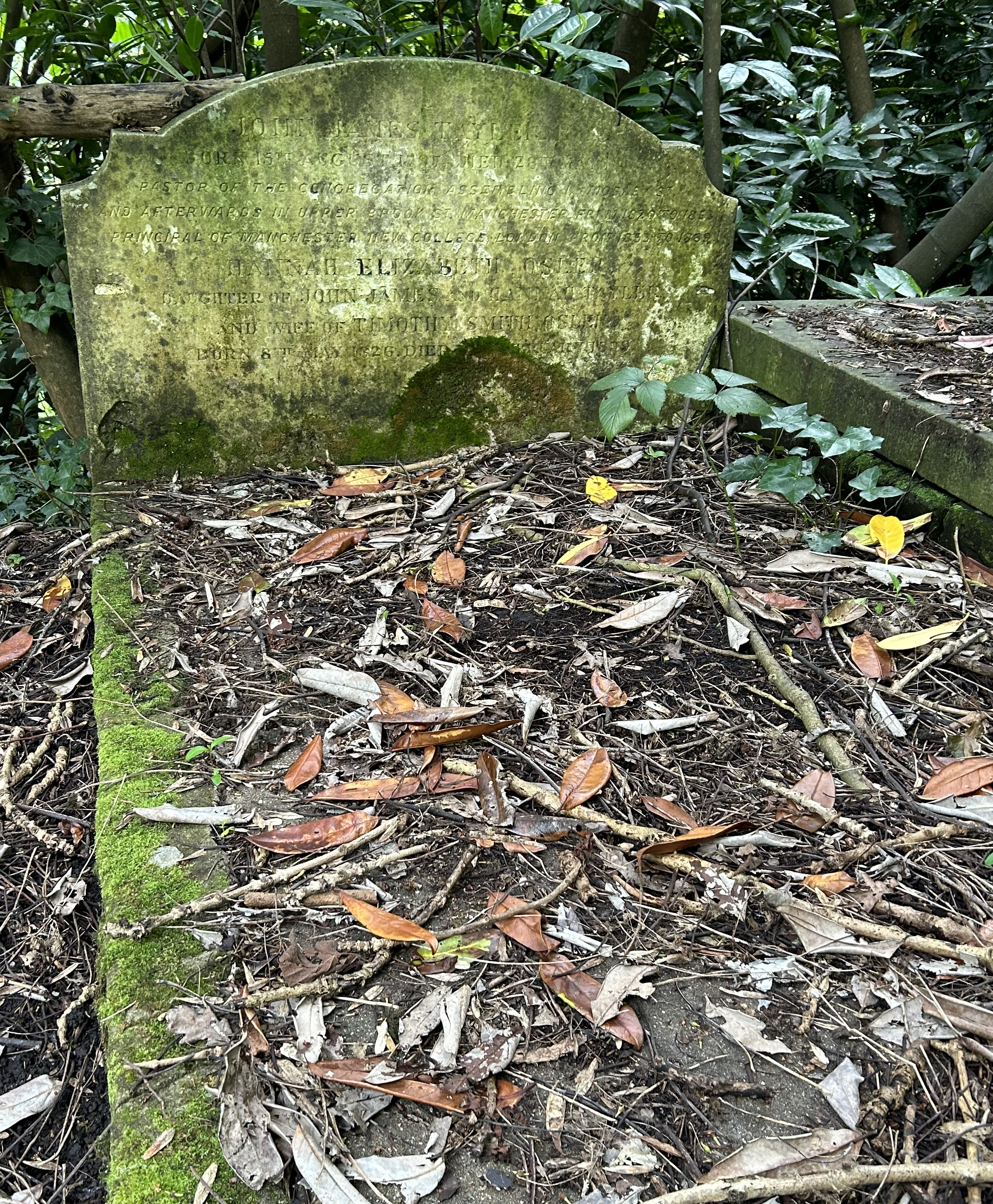
Family grave of John James Tayler in Highgate Cemetery

By 8 November he was back in Hampstead, London. Following his return from this Transylvanian journey, according to Thom, “A languor marked him from that time, with the not unfrequent look of one whose mind was far away.”

On 28 May 1869 he died in Hampstead, and on 3 June he was buried on the west side of Highgate Cemetery, beside his wife and son.

There is a window dedicated to him in Rosslyn Hill Chapel, Hampstead, on the east side in the middle with the following inscription: "In memory of the Revd John James Tayler, B. A. Principal and Professor of | Manchester New College, London. Born August 16th 1797. Died May 18th 1869. His scholarly attainments, his comprehensive views, his catholic spirit, and his far-seeing wisdom all known by his writings. This window is placed here by friends and fellow worshipers as a tribute to his simple and elevated character, saintly virtues, large humanity tender sympathies and child-like devotion. His life was a persuasive to piety; his memory lifts up the heart to a better world."

== Family ==
Tayler married (6 January 1825) Miss Hannah Smith (died 16 February 1862), the daughter of the banker Timothy Smith of Icknield, Birmingham.

Their first child, Hannah Elizabeth (1826?-†11 February 1899) was probably born early 1826; the following year a second child, John Hutton Tayler (1827–1854). On 8 July 1838, their 3rd child, a daughter, was born at Blackpool, and died the following year on 22 March 1839.

The novelist, Elizabeth Gaskell, married to the Unitarian William Gaskell, who was at Cross Street Unitarian Chapel, Manchester, gave a humorous account of Hannah's pregnancy and birth.

== Works ==
Besides sermons and addresses, Tayler published:

- Some Remarks on the Nature of Genius. By the Rev. John James Tayler, A. B. One of the Secretaries of the Society.(Read 31 October 1823. In: Memoirs of the Literary and Philosophical Society of Manchester. Second Series. Volume IV, 1824, pp. 373–426.
- Some Account of the Life and Writings of Herder. In: The Monthly Repository, Vol. IV,1830, pp. 729–738; 829–843.
- Herder’s Thoughts on the Philosophy of the History of Mankind.In: The Monthly Repository, Vol. VI,1832, Art. I. pp. 34–42; Art. II. 86–97; Art. III. 165–178; Art. IV. 217–233.
- On the moral education of the people: a discourse, preached on the evening of 1 December 1833 : with an appendix, containing extracts from M. Victor Cousin's report to the French government on the state of popular education in Germany. London; Manchester: Rowland Hunter : Robert Robinson, 1833.
- On the Relation of Theology to General Science and Literature. In: The Christian Teacher, Vol. 1,1835, pp. 12–23. [11] [signed: ‘Göttingen, 10 November 1834.’]
- Recollections of Schleiermacher. In: The Christian Teacher, Vol. 1, 1835, pp. 253–263; 272–281. [‘Abridged with his own footnotes from ‘Erinnerungen an Dr. Friederic Schleiermacher von Dr. Friederic Lücke,’ from the ‚Theologische und Kritiken’ ]
- Conclusion of a Sermon, preached, on occasion of the Festival of the Reformation, in the University Church of Göttingen, by Julius Müller, University Preacher, and extraordinary Professor of Theology. In: The Christian Teacher, Vol. 1, 1835, pp. 535–539.
- Retrospect of a Twelvemonth Passed in Germany. In: The Christian Teacher, Vol. 2, (1836), pp. 49–58;65–72;201–210;292–301;385–395;457–465.
- Forms of Prayer for Public Worship, 1839; 1851
- A Retrospect of the Religious Life of England: or the Church, Puritanism, and Free Inquiry, (London: John Chapman, 1845); (2nd ed. rev.,1853); 1876 (edited by James Martineau).
- Socialist and Communist Theories. In: The Prospective Review, 1848, Vol. 4, (Christian Teacher Vol. X.), July, Number XV, Art. III., pp. 351–390.[Reviews of works by : Lorenz von Stein (1815–1890)‚Karl Grün(1817–1887), Victor Prosper Considerant (1808–1893), Charles Fourier (1772–1837), Hippolyte Renaud (1803–1874), Louis Blanc (1811–1882) and the English 'Redemption Society']
- Speech on the Question of American Slavery. [Thursday 19 June 1851] In: The Christian Reformer, Vol. 7,1851, pp. 437–438.
- Christian Aspects of Faith and Duty, 1851; 1855; in German by J. Bernhard, Gotha, 1869; second series, 1877.
- Inaugural address, at the opening of the first session of Manchester New College, in connection with University College, delivered in University Hall, on Friday, 14 October 1853. London,1853
- The Rev. J. J. Tayler’s Lecture to the Secularist. In: The Reasoner & London Tribune. A Weekly Secular Newspaper, No. 6. Sunday, 6 May 1855, pp. 42–43. [Originally delivered at the Literary Institution, John Street, Fitzroy Square, Friday, 27 April.]
- Mr. Tayler on Religion in Germany, Heidelberg, 8 September 1856 In: The Christian Reformer, Vol. 12,1856, pp. 577–583; 651–660; 705–719.
- Two Lectures; being the introduction to a course on the early history of Christianity. London,1857.
- Hegel’s Philosophy of History In: The National Review, Vol. 7, Nr. XIII.—July 1858, pp. 99–124.
- The Pentateuch: And Its Relation To The Jewish And Christian Dispensations. By Andrews Norton, Late Professor of Sacred History, Harvard University. Mass. Edited By John James Tayler, B.A. Member of the Historico-Theological Society of Leipsic, and Principal of Manchester New College, London. London, 1863.
- The Church and Theology of Germany during the Nineteenth Century. In: The National Review, Vol. 18, 1864, January, Art. VIII, pp. 191–230. [a review of ‘Kirchengeschichte des neuenzehnten Jahrhunderts, von Dr. Ferdinand Christian Baur. Tübingen, 1862.’]
- Strauss's New Work on the Life of Jesus. In: The Theological Review: A Journal of Religious Thought and Life, Vol. 1, 1864, No. III. July, pp. 335–365.
- An Attempt to ascertain the Character of the Fourth Gospel; especially in its relation to the three first. By John James Tayler, B.A., Member Of The Historico-Theological Society Of Leipsic, and Principal of Manchester New College, London., 1867[it was dedicated to his former teacher John Kenrick: "To THE REV. JOHN KENRICK, M.A., F.S.A., Etc., for more than thirty years classical and historical tutor in Manchester New College, York; known to the learned by his acute and thorough researches into the history and mythology of the ancient world: not as claiming his assent to conclusions which he may not accept, but as a feeble though sincere expression of the love of scholarly honesty in the pursuit of truth, which it was the constant aim of his instructions to inspire this attempt to elucidate an important critical question, is, with every sentiment of respect and gratitude, inscribed by his friend and former pupil, the author]; 2nd ed. 1870 (edited by James Martineau).
- Letters Embracing His Life of John James Tayler, B.A., Professor of Ecclesiastical History and Biblical Theology, And Principal of Manchester New College, London. Edited By John Hamilton Thom. In Two Volumes: with Portrait. Williams & Norgate, | 14, Henrietta Street, Covent Garden, London; And 20, South Frederick Street, Edinburgh. 1872.His friend and colleague, John Hamilton Thom separated the two volumes of Tayler's selected letters, published in 1872, into four distinct periods of his life:

1) To the time of his Marriage: 1797–1825.

2) From his marriage to his appointment of professor of Ecclesiastical history in Manchester New College, 1825–1840.

3) From his Professorship in Manchester New College, to his removal with the college to London 1840–1853.

4) Residence in London, as Principal and professor of Ecclesiastical History and of Doctrinal and Practical Theology in Manchester New College, to his Decease. 1853–1869. Thom also published here an incomplete bibliography of his works: See Appendix. List of Mr. Tayler's Publications, [330]-336.

Tayler wrote memoirs of John Eddowes Bowman and John Gooch Robberds. He was one of the editors (1845–54) of the Prospective Review, to which he contributed; he wrote also in The Theological Review and other periodicals.

== Notes ==
Attribution This article incorporates text from a publication now in the public domain: Gordon, Alexander (1898). "Tayler, John James". In Lee, Sidney (ed.). Dictionary of National Biography. Vol. 55. London: Smith, Elder & Co. pp. 399–400.

Professional and academic associations
| Preceded by Peter Clare | Secretary of the Manchester Literary and Philosophical Society; 1822–37 | Succeeded by Joseph Atkinson Ransome |
