= Robert Wallace (Unitarian) =

English Unitarian minister

Robert Wallace (1791–1850) was an English Unitarian minister, now best known for his Antitrinitarian Biography (1850).

== Life ==
He was born at Dudley, Worcestershire, on 26 February 1791. In 1808 he came under the influence of James Hews Bransby, who prepared him for entrance (September 1810) at Manchester College, then at York, under Charles Wellbeloved and John Kenrick. One of his fellow students was Jacob Brettell.

Leaving York in 1815, he became minister at Elder Yard, Chesterfield. While here he conducted a private school for sixteen years. He wrote in the Monthly Repository and the Christian Reformer on biblical and patristic topics. His review (1834) of John Henry Newman's Arians of the Fourth Century brought him into correspondence with Thomas Turton.

In 1840 Manchester College was moved from York to Manchester. In the same year Wallace was appointed to succeed Wellbeloved. He delivered in October his inaugural lecture as professor of critical and exegetical theology. In 1842 he was made principal of the theological department. His theological position was conservative, but he was the first in his denomination to bring to his classroom the processes and results of German critical research. Among his pupils was Philip Pearsall Carpenter.

After six years he resigned his teaching post due to ill health, and in June 1846 he became minister of Trim Street Chapel, Bath. He was made visitor of his college, and became a fellow of the Geological Society. He preached for the last time on 10 March 1850, and died at Bath on 13 May. He was buried in the graveyard at Lyncomb, near Bath.

His daughter donated his library to the Unitarian Home Missionary College.

== The Antitrinitarian Biography ==
His Antitrinitarian Biography, (1850, 3 vols.) was the result of nearly 24 years' research. In breadth of treatment and in depth of original research Wallace's work is inferior to that of Thomas Rees (1777–1864), but he deploys a careful array of authorities. He covers more ground than previous writers giving lives and biographies, continental and English, extending from the Protestant Reformation to the early eighteenth century. His introduction deals mainly with the development of opinion in England over that period.

A major source was the Bibliotheca antitrinitariorum of Christopher Sandius.

== Family ==
He was the son of Robert Wallace (d. 17 June 1830) by his wife Phoebe (d.11 March 1837), His father was a pawnbroker; his grandfather was a Dumfriesshire farmer.

Two of his younger brothers also joined the Unitarian ministry. They were;

- James Cowden Wallace (1793?-1841), Unitarian minister at Totnes (1824-6), York Street, London (1827-8), Brighton (1828-9), Preston (1829–31), Wareham (1831–41), who wrote numerous hymns, sixty-four of which are in J. R. Beard's Collection of Hymns, 1837, 12mo
- Charles Wallace (1796–1859), who was educated at Glasgow (M.A. 1817) and Manchester College, York (1817–19), and was minister at Altrincham and Hale, Cheshire (1829–56).

In 1825 he married Sophia Lakin (d. 31 May 1835), daughter of Michael Lakin of Birmingham, by whom he had a daughter, who survived him.
