= Edward Holme =

British doctor and antiquary (1770–1847)

Edward Holme FLS
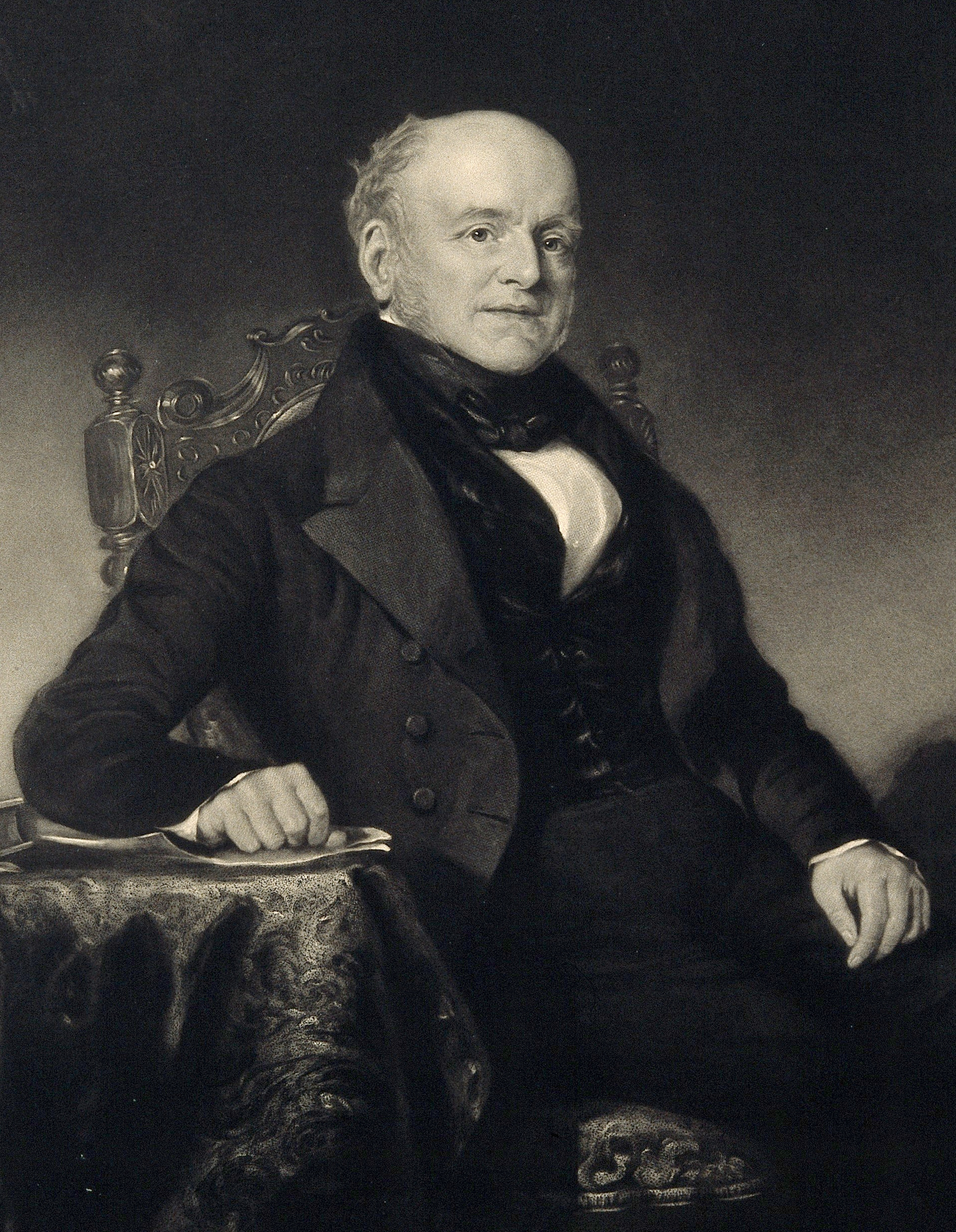
- Edward Holme, mezzotint by John Richardson Jackson
- Born: 17 February 1770; Kendal, Westmorland, England
- Died: 28 November 1847 (aged 77); Manchester, Lancashire, England
- Education: Sedbergh School; Manchester Academy; University of Göttingen; University of Edinburgh; University of Leyden
- Occupation: Physician

Edward Holme (17 February 1770 – 28 November 1847) was an English physician and supporter of learned societies.

== Life ==
The son of Thomas Holme, farmer and mercer, he was born at Kendal in Westmorland. After attending Sedbergh School, he spent two years at the Manchester Academy, and then studied at the University of Göttingen and University of Edinburgh. He graduated MD at the University of Leyden in December 1793.

Early in 1794 Holme began practice in Manchester, and was shortly afterwards elected one of the physicians to the infirmary there. He joined the Manchester Literary and Philosophical Society, and was one of its Vice-Presidents from 1797 to 1844, when he succeeded John Dalton as President. He was one of the founders of the Portico Library, and its President for twenty-eight years. He was also a founder and first President of both the Manchester Natural History Society and the Chetham Society (from 1843). He was the first president of the medical section of the British Association at its inaugural meeting at York (1831), and presided over the Provincial Medical and Surgical Association in 1836. He became a Fellow of the Linnean Society in 1799. He was for many years, particularly after the death of John Ferriar, a leader in the medical profession in Manchester, and in the local literary and scientific societies.

Holme died unmarried, on 28 November 1847, at Manchester, leaving property worth over £50,000. Most of it he bequeathed, together with his library, to the medical department of University College, London.

== Works ==
Holme's Leyden dissertation De Structura et Usu Vasorum Absorbentium ran to 61 pages. Of fourteen essays contributed to the Literary and Philosophical Society, he only published a short Note on a Roman inscription found at Manchester (Manchester Memoirs, vol. v.). Another essay, On the History of Sculpture to the Time of Phidias, was printed after his death.

== Notes ==
Attribution

This article incorporates text from a publication now in the public domain: Lee, Sidney, ed. (1891). "Holme, Edward". Dictionary of National Biography. Vol. 27. London: Smith, Elder & Co.

Professional and academic associations
Preceded by John Dalton	President of the Manchester Literary and Philosophical Society; 1844–47	Succeeded by Eaton Hodgkinson
Preceded by Samuel Argent Bardsley	Secretary of the Manchester Literary and Philosophical Society; 1794–98	Succeeded by William Henry
Preceded by Creation	President of the Chetham Society; 1843–47	Succeeded by James Crossley
