= Timothy Kenrick =

Welsh Unitarian minister

Timothy Kenrick (1759–1804) was a Welsh Unitarian minister, biblical commentator, and dissenting academy tutor.

== Life ==
Wynn Hall, Kenrick's birthplace

The third son of John Kenrick of Wynn Hall in the parish of Ruabon, Denbighshire, by Mary, daughter of Timothy Quarrell of Llanfyllin, Montgomeryshire, he was born at Wynn Hall on 26 January 1759, and baptised on 6 February. Archibald Kenrick the manufacturer was a brother, so that Timothy Kenrick of Birmingham (1807–1885) was a nephew.

In 1774 Kenrick entered Daventry Academy under Caleb Ashworth, who was succeeded in 1775 by Thomas Robins. While still a student he was chosen assistant-tutor in classics; during one session he read lectures for Robins, who had lost his voice, and on Robins's resignation (1781) he continued under Thomas Belsham as classical and then as mathematical tutor.

In January 1784 Kenrick became colleague to James Manning at George's Meeting, Exeter, and was ordained there on 28 July 1785. The two pastors worked together, though Manning was an Arian, while Kenrick followed Belsham in theology, and drew up (1792) the preamble of the Western Unitarian Society, excluding Arians.

In 1798 Kenrick declined an invitation to the divinity chair in the Manchester Academy. In the summer of 1799 he opened a dissenting academy at Exeter, with Joseph Bretland. He followed the Daventry model, and used a library formed for the academy run (1690–1720) by Joseph Hallett II, and revived (1760–71) under Samuel Merivale. In Kenrick's academy, which closed on 25 March 1805, eleven students, including James Hews Bransby, received the whole, and four others, including Kenrick's eldest son, a part of their training.

Kenrick died suddenly while on a visit to Wrexham, on 22 August 1804. He was buried on 26 August in the dissenters' graveyard at Rhosddu, near Wrexham, where there was an inscription to his memory. A harsh portrayal of Kenrick was in Particulars of the Life of a Dissenting Minister … Written by Himself (1813) by Charles Lloyd.

== Works ==
Kenrick published four sermons (1788–1795), and there appeared posthumously:

- Discourses on Various Topics, 1805, 2 vols.
- An Exposition of the Historical Writings of the New Testament, 1807, 3 vols. (with Memoir by John Kentish), a work representative of the exegesis of the older Unitarian school.

== Family ==
Kenrick married, first, in 1786, Mary (died 1793), daughter of John Waymouth of Exeter, who died in giving birth to her sixth child. John, the eldest son, is known as a classical historian. George Kenrick (1792–1874), the fourth was born at Exeter on 28 October 1792, and became a pupil of Lant Carpenter. He studied at Glasgow College (1808–10) and Manchester College, York (1810–13), and was Unitarian minister at Chesterfield (1813–1814), Kingston-upon-Hull (1815–21), Maidstone (1822–6), Hampstead (1829–45), and Battle, Sussex (1845–7). He was a trustee of Dr. Williams's foundations, 1833–60. In 1860 he retired in poor health to Tunbridge Wells, where he died on 2 December 1874. He married, first, in 1817, the youngest daughter of Richard Hodgson, Unitarian minister at Doncaster; secondly, Lucy, sister of Sir John Bowring; thirdly, Sarah (died 1888), daughter of Thomas Walters. He published sermons and contributed to the Monthly Repository and other periodicals.

Kenrick married secondly, in 1794, Elizabeth (d. 1819), second daughter of James Belsham, and sister of his former tutor. They had no children.

== Notes ==
Attribution

This article incorporates text from a publication now in the public domain: Lee, Sidney, ed. (1892). "Kenrick, Timothy". Dictionary of National Biography. Vol. 31. London: Smith, Elder & Co.
