= Frederick Crace Calvert =

English chemist

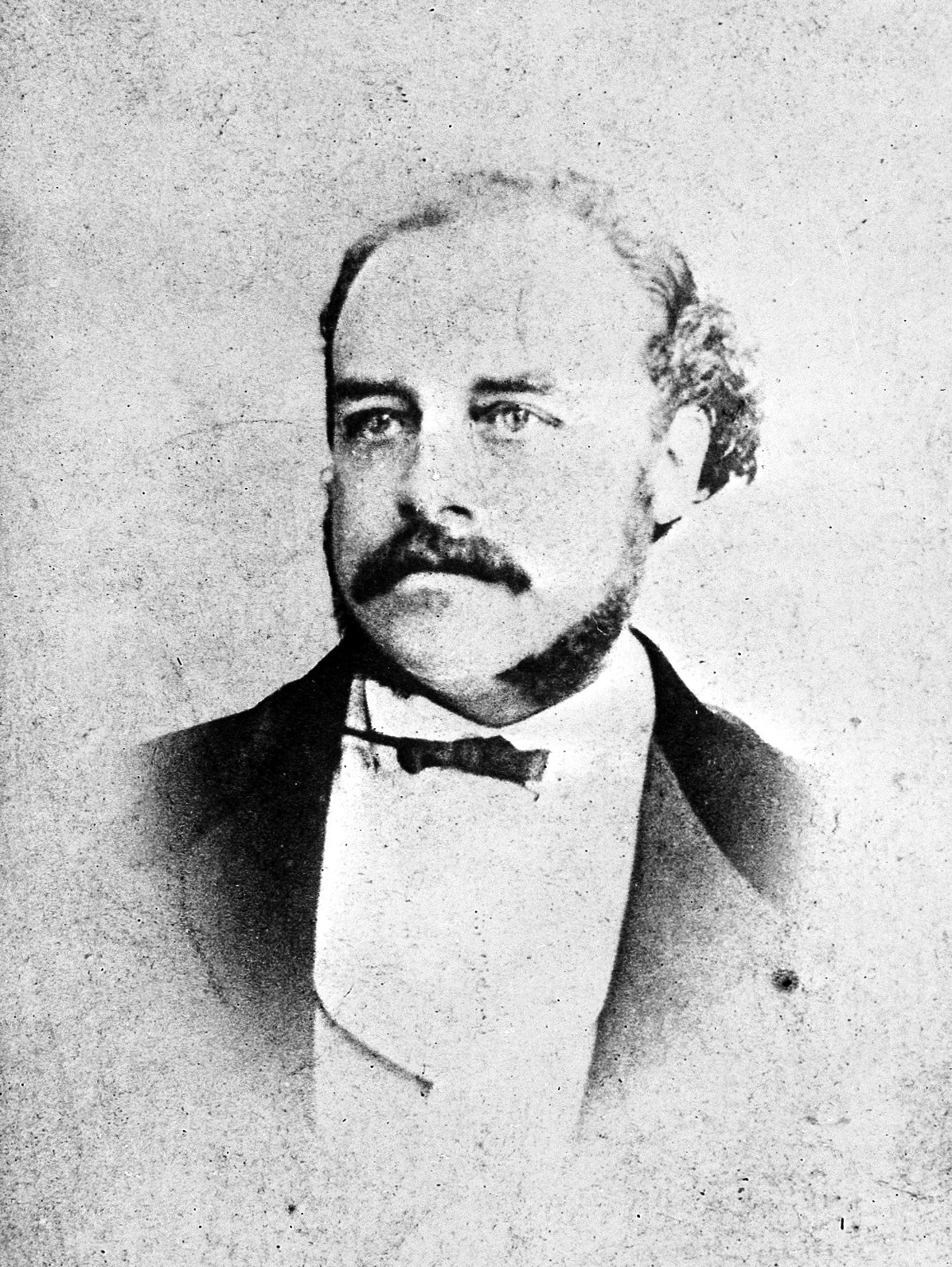
Portrait. Credit: Wellcome Library.

Frederick Crace Calvert (14 November 1819 – 24 October 1873), English chemist, was born near London. He was the son of Alfred Crace and the nephew of the noted interior decorator Frederick Crace.

From about 1836 until 1846 he lived in France, where, after a course of study at Paris, he became manager of some chemical works, later acting as assistant to Michel Eugène Chevreul. On his return to England he settled in Manchester where he was elected to the Manchester Literary and Philosophical Society on 26 January 1847, working as a consulting chemist, and was appointed honorary professor of chemistry at the Royal Manchester Institution. Devoting himself almost entirely to industrial chemistry, establishing in 1859 F. C. Calvert and Company, he gave much attention to the manufacture of coal-tar products, and particularly carbolic acid AKA Phenol (for use in the treatment of raw sewage)(for the production of which he established large works in Manchester in 1865). Besides contributing extensively to the English and French scientific journals, he published a work on Dyeing and Calico-Printing. He died in Manchester. His obituary is at He is buried in the churchyard of St Saviours Church, Chorlton on Medlock.

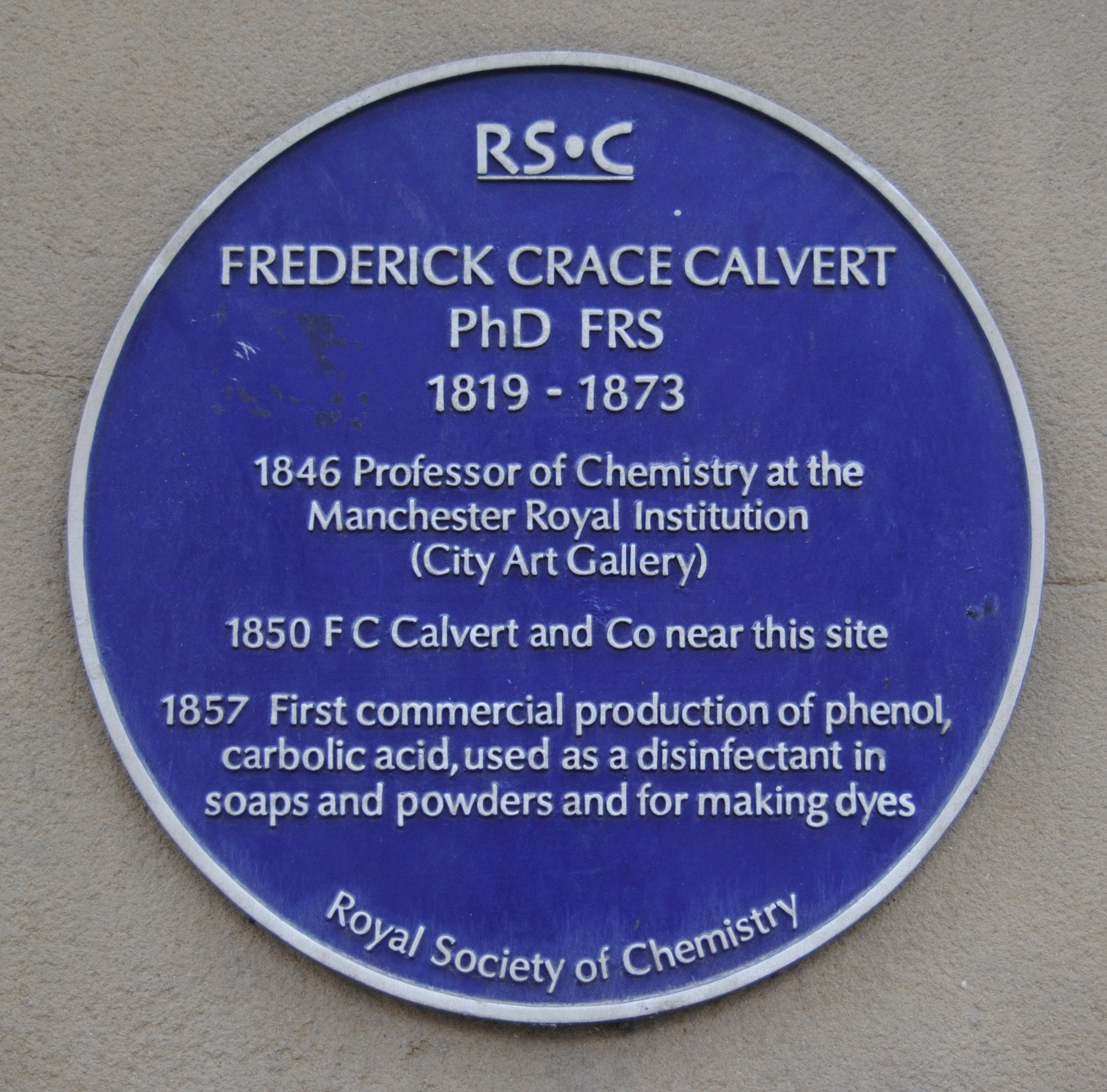
Blue plaque

He is commemorated by a Royal Society of Chemistry blue plaque on Princess Street in Manchester.
