= William Pitt Scargill =

English Unitarian minister and writer

- Born: 1787; London
- Died: 24 January 1836 (aged 48–49)
- Occupations: Unitarian minister and writer

William Pitt Scargill (1787 – 24 January 1836) was an English Unitarian minister and writer.

== Biography ==
Scargill was born in London in 1787. Originally intended for a business life, he attracted the notice of Hugh Worthington, minister at Salters' Hall, under whose advice he studied for the ministry at Wymondley academy. For six months (March to August 1811) he was assistant to James Tayler at High Pavement Chapel, Nottingham. In 1812 he succeeded Thomas Madge as minister of Churchgate Street Chapel, Bury St. Edmunds, and held this charge for twenty years.

His ministry was not successful, and he turned to literature as a means of augmenting a narrow income, contributing to periodicals, and producing original tales and sketches. He had been a liberal in politics, but displeased his congregation by becoming a writer for the tory press. Resigning his charge in 1832, he became an adherent of the established church.

At the end of 1834 he published anonymously ‘The Autobiography of a Dissenting Minister,’ in which he plays the part of a candid friend to his former co-religionists. The book is often classed with the anonymous ‘Particulars of the Life of a Dissenting Minister’ [1813], by Charles Lloyd; but Lloyd's is a genuine autobiography, Scargill's a romance, though possibly based on his early life and education. He made a precarious living by his pen, yet his sketches are brisk and readable, with a curious vein of paradox. An essay on ‘The Blessings of Biography’ opens with the advice, ‘If you think a man to be a devil, and want to make him an angel, sit down to write a biography of him.’ He was famed as a punster. He died of brain fever at Bury St. Edmunds on 24 January 1836.

He married Mary Anne, daughter of Robert Cutting of Chevington, Suffolk, who survived him with two children.

== Publications ==
He published:

- ‘An Essay on War,’ 8vo, n. d.
- ‘Essays on Various Subjects,’ 1815, 8vo.
- ‘Moral Discourses,’ 1816, 12mo.
- ‘The Sequel of “Truth,”’ a novel [1826], by Elizabeth Evanshaw, 1827, 12mo.
- ‘Truckleborough Hall,’ 1827, 12mo.
- ‘Penelope; or Love's Labour Lost,’ 1829, 16mo.
- ‘Rank and Talent,’ 1829, 12mo; reprinted [1856], 8vo.
- ‘Tales of a Briefless Barrister,’ 1829, 12mo.
- ‘Atherton: a Tale of the Last Century,’ 1831, 8vo.
- ‘The Usurer's Daughter,’ 1832, 12mo; reprinted [1853], 8vo.
- ‘The Puritan's Grave,’ 1833, 12mo.
- ‘The Autobiography of a Dissenting Minister,’ 1834, 8vo (anon.); reissued with new title-pages and prefaces as 2nd, 3rd, and 4th editions, all 1835.
- ‘Provincial Sketches,’ 1835, 12mo.

His widow edited some of his contributions to periodicals, many from the ‘Atlas’ newspaper, with the title ‘The Widow's Offering. A selection of Tales and Essays,’ 1837, 8vo, 2 vols. Of this a pirated edition appeared as ‘The English Sketchbook,’ 1856, 8vo. His widow republished the collection with title ‘Essays and Sketches,’ 2nd edit. [1857], 8vo.
