= List of societies for education in Manchester =

Notable societies for education and learning in Manchester, England, have included:

- Manchester Literary and Philosophical Society, founded 1781
- Royal Manchester Institution, founded 1823
- Manchester Mechanics' Institute, founded 1824
- Manchester Statistical Society, founded 1833
- Manchester Athenaeum, founded 1835
- Chetham Society, founded 1843
- Lancashire and Cheshire Antiquarian Society, founded 1883
- Manchester Geographical Society, founded 1884
