= Thomas Henry (apothecary) =

Welsh surgeon and apothecary (1734–1816)

Thomas Henry FRS
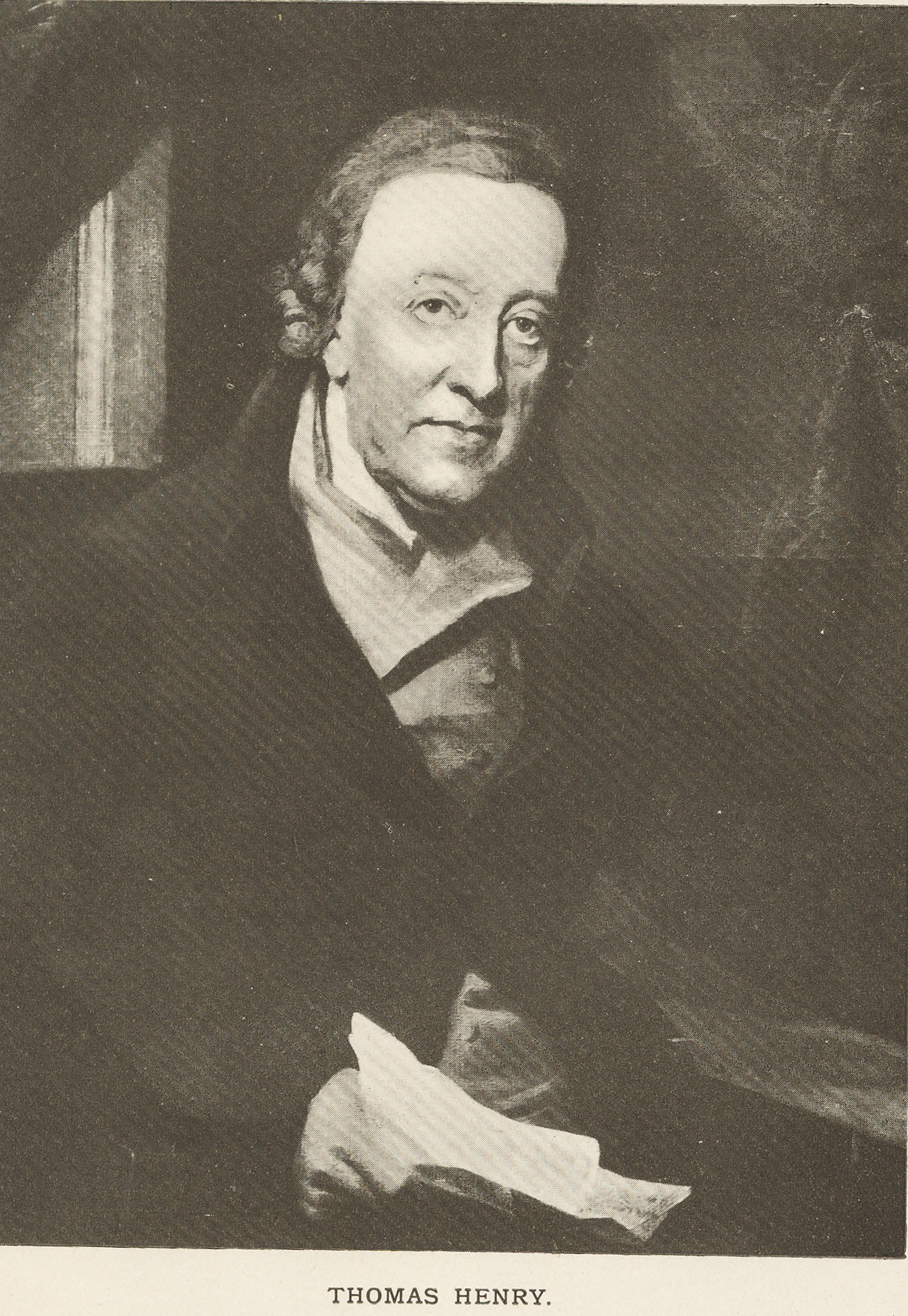
- Born: 26 October 1734; Wrexham, Wales
- Died: 18 June 1816 (aged 81)
- Occupations: Surgeon; Apothecary
- Children: William Henry

Thomas Henry (26 October 1734 – 18 June 1816) was a surgeon and apothecary. He was a Fellow of the Royal Society of London, and also the father of William Henry, the chemist who formulated Henry's Law.

== Background ==
Henry was born in Wrexham, Wales training as a surgeon-apothecary in that town. He later moved to Manchester in England.

== Career ==
He invented a process for preparing magnesia alba in 1771 and became known as "Magnesia" Henry. He was a founder and afterwards president of the Manchester Literary and Philosophical Society. being Elected to membership on 20 April 1827

In 1776, Thomas Henry speculated tongue in cheek that Joseph Priestley’s newly discovered dephlogisticated air (now called oxygen) might become “as fashionable as French wine at the fashionable taverns”. He did not expect, however, that tavern goers would “relish calling for a bottle of Air, instead of Claret”.

After Priestley's publication of a method to make carbonated water, Henry manufactured "artificial Pyrmont and Seltzer waters" for sale in the late 1770s, imitating the famous sparkling mineral waters, e.g. from Selters.

On 28 February 1781 he was elected to the Manchester Literary and Philosophical Society, and in 1786, he was elected to the American Philosophical Society.

== Legacy ==
The Thomas Henry mixer company was launched in Berlin in 2010, taking its name and inspiration from Thomas Henry.

Professional and academic associations
Preceded by George Walker	President of the Manchester Literary and Philosophical Society; 1807–09	Succeeded by John Hull
Preceded by John Hull	President of the Manchester Literary and Philosophical Society; 1809–16	Succeeded by John Dalton
Preceded by George Bew	Secretary of the Manchester Literary and Philosophical Society; 1781–88	Succeeded by Thomas Barnes
