= Samuel Argent Bardsley =

British doctor (1764–1850)

Samuel Argent Bardsley MD
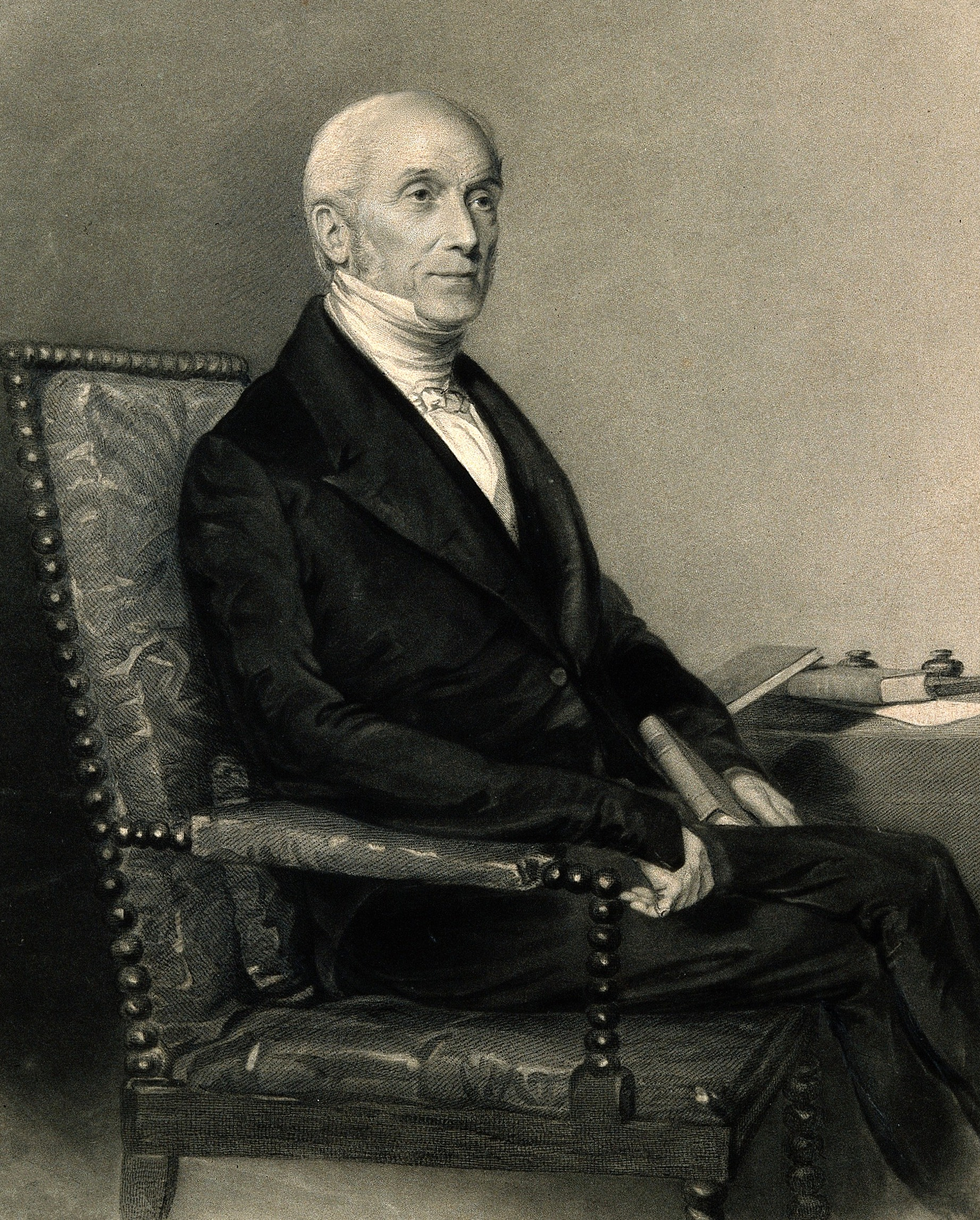
- Samuel Argent Bardsley (Lithograph by J. Thomson after C. A. Wellcome)
- Born: 27 April 1764; Kelvedon, Essex, England
- Died: 29 May 1851 (aged 87); Hastings, England
- Education: Leyden University
- Occupation: Physician

Samuel Argent Bardsley, MD (27 April 1764 – 29 May 1851), was an English physician.

== Life ==
Bardsley was born at Kelvdon, Essex. His medical studies were begun at Nottingham, where he passed an apprenticeship to a surgeon, and followed up at London, Edinburgh, and Leyden. He was entered of the Leyden University in August 1786, and graduated there in 1789.

After passing a short time at Doncaster he removed to Manchester in 1790, where he was elected to membership of the Manchester Literary and Philosophical Society on 10 December 1790 and Secretary of the Society 1793–96 . Later he was elected physician to the Manchester Infirmary, a position he retained until August 1823, gaining during the thirty-three years great esteem as 'the very model of an hospital physician.'

He relinquished his professional 'practice' many years before his death, which occurred on 29 May 1851, while on a visit to a friend near Hastings. He was buried at St. Saviour's Church, Manchester.

== Works ==
Bardsley published in 1800 'Critical Remarks on the Tragedy of Pizarro, with Observations on the subject of the Drama;’ and in 1807 a volume of 'Medical Reports of Cases and Experiments, with Observations chiefly derived from Hospital practice; also an Enquiry into the Origin of Canine Madness.' To the 'Memoirs' of the Literary and Philosophical Society of Manchester, of which he was a vice-president, he contributed in 1798 a paper on 'Party Prejudice,’ and in 1803 one on 'The Use and Abuse of Popular Sports and Exercises.'

Manuscript copies of lectures given by Bardsley and taken down by his students survive within the Manchester Medical Manuscripts Collection held by special collections at the University of Manchester Library with the references MMM/7/12 and MMM/23/1/20. The collection also includes a commonplace book (MMM/3/1) created by Bardsley between 1796 and 1848 in which he comments a number of medical, political, economic, and social issues of the times.

Professional and academic associations
Preceded by Samuel Harvey	Secretary of the Manchester Literary and Philosophical Society; 1793–96	Succeeded by Edward Holme
