= Manchester Athenaeum =

Listed building in Manchester, England

Coordinates: 53°28′43″N 2°14′29″W

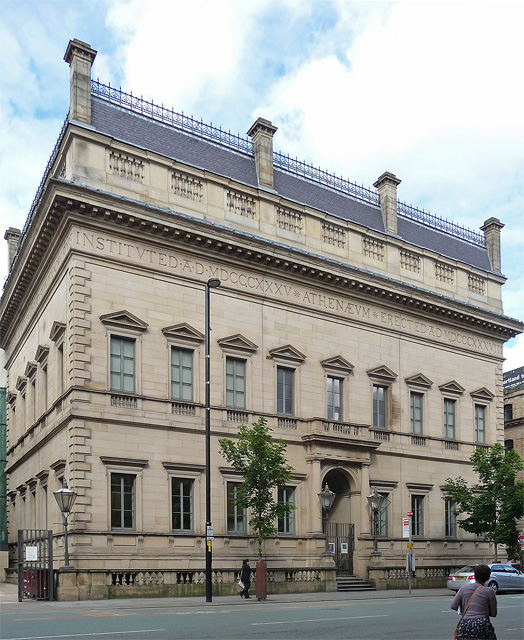
- Manchester Athenaeum is part of the art gallery

- Location within Greater Manchester

General information
- Architectural style: Italian Palazzo style
- Location: Princess Street, Manchester, England
- Year built: 1837

Technical details
- Material: Sandstone ashlar

Design and construction
- Architect: Sir Charles Barry
- Designations

Listed Building – Grade II*
- Official name: The Athenaeum
- Designated: 3 October 1974
- Reference no.: 1270889

Other information
- Public transit: St Peter's Square tram stop

The Athenaeum on Princess Street in Manchester, England, now part of Manchester Art Gallery, was built in 1837 as a club for the Manchester Athenaeum, a society founded in 1835 to promote the "advancement and diffusion of knowledge". Until the society raised enough money for its own premises, it met in the neighbouring Royal Manchester Institution. Despite early financial difficulties, the Athenaeum became an important centre of Manchester's literary life before ceasing operations in 1938.

The building, designed by Sir Charles Barry in the Italian palazzo style, the first such building in the city, was acquired by Manchester Corporation in 1938.

The Athenaeum was designated a Grade II* listed building in 1974. In 2002 Manchester Art Gallery was extended by Hopkins Architects, following an architectural design competition run by RIBA Competitions, to incorporate the Athenaeum. The two buildings are now connected by a glass atrium.

== Society ==
The Manchester Athenaeum for the Advancement and Diffusion of Knowledge was founded in 1835, with James Heywood as its first president. It met initially at the Royal Manchester Institution until funds had been raised for its own building, which was completed in 1837. Their new premises had a newsroom on the ground floor, and a library, lecture hall and coffee room. A billiards room and gymnasium were added later.

Richard Cobden was instrumental in promoting education in the city and spoke at the opening. He, along with a significant number of other members of the Anti-Corn Law League's Council, was an important figure in both instigating and developing the society during its early years. He described it as a "manufactory for working up the raw intelligence of the town".

By 1838, there were over 1,000 members, each paying an annual subscription of 30 shillings. The club then hit upon and survived financial difficulties to become the centre for Manchester's literary life. A report about the society in the Sheffield Times in 1847 noted that it catered for the "mental and moral improvement" of the intelligent among the middle-classes and that the shared pursuit of "rational amusement" was an aid to bridging the social gap between masters and men. That report, and thus the society, directly inspired two societies with similar goals in Sheffield, confusingly both calling themselves the Sheffield Athenaeum.

The society was promoted as "an institution for the benefit of the tradesmen, commercial assistants and apprentices, professional students, clerks, of this very populous and flourishing town". It also emphasised its admission of women, although in practice until 1844 they had limited membership rights, being barred from full engagement in its activities and from its management. Charles Dickens and Benjamin Disraeli addressed its membership in the 1840s.

Manchester Corporation acquired the building in 1938, when the society ceased operations.

== Architecture ==
Sir Charles Barry, who designed the Royal Manchester Institution in the Greek Revival style, designed the Athenaeum in the Italian palazzo style, the first such building in the city.

The building is constructed of sandstone ashlar under a slate roof on a rectangular plan and originally had two storeys and a basement. It has a symmetrical nine-window façade with raised rusticated quoins at the corners and an inscribed frieze under a prominent mutuled cornice. The inscriptions on the frieze are, "INSTUTVTED MDCCCXXXV ATHENAEUM ERECTED MDCCCXXXVIII" and "FOR THE ADVANCEMENT AND DIFFVSION OF KNOWLEDGE". The building's interior was damaged by fire in 1874 and was remodelled and an attic floor was added behind a high balustraded parapet with four tall chimneys.

A central entrance porch with a coffered barrel-vaulted ceiling is accessed by a flight of stone steps and has Doric columns supporting a frieze, moulded cornice and balustraded parapet. The first and second floors have tall two-light casement windows with architraves, balustrades and pediments to the second floor.

== See also ==
- Grade II* listed buildings in Greater Manchester
- List of societies for education in Manchester
- Listed buildings in Manchester-M1
