= James Hews Bransby =

English Unitarian minister

James Hews Bransby (17 March 1783 – 4 November 1847) was an English Unitarian minister. He was noted for eccentric behaviour.

== Life ==
Bransby was a native of Ipswich. His father, John Bransby (d. 17 March 1837, aged seventy-five), was an instrument maker, a fellow of the Royal Astronomical Society, and author of a treatise on The Use of the Globes, 1791, and editor of the Ipswich Magazine, 1799.

The son became heterodox in opinion, and was educated for the Unitarian ministry, in the academy maintained at Exeter from 1799 to 1804 by Timothy Kenrick and Joseph Bretland. On 1 May 1803 he was invited to become minister at the "new meeting" (founded 1802) to the old presbyterian congregation at Moreton Hampstead, Devon. Here he kept a school, and among his pupils was John Bowring, in whose autobiography Bransby features.

In 1805 Bransby moved to Dudley. He continued to keep a preparatory school for boys. His eccentricities gradually excited considerable remark, particularly as he developed a tendency towards kleptomania. At length he committed a breach of trust, involving forgery, which was condoned on condition of his leaving Dudley in 1828 forever. He was succeeded, on 1 July 1829, by Samuel Bache.

Bransby then moved to Wales. Intriguingly he appears as a witness to Edward Mason (probably a lead miner who was illiterate, and almost certainly a monoglot Welsh-speaker) on his marriage at Llanbadarn Fawr near Aberystwyth in 1811, long before his departure from Dudley in 1828. He supported himself by teaching in Caernarfon, by editing a paper, and by odd jobs of literary work. He would borrow a manuscript and, after improvements, send it to a magazine as his own. An irresistible impulse led him on one occasion to revisit Dudley for a few hours; as he stood gazing at his old meeting-house he was recognised, but spared.

Late in life he occasionally preached again.

Bransby died suddenly at Bron Hendref, a substantial house on the outskirts of Caernarfon, on 4 November 1847, aged 64 years, where he is listed in 1841 as keeping a school. His wife, Sarah, daughter of J. Isaac, general Baptist minister at Moreton Hampstead, predeceased him on 28 October 1841. His executor was his sister-in-law, Aann Isaac, who acted as Bransby's school Drawing Mistress.\

== Publications ==
Bransby left behind him a mass of compromising papers, which fell by chance into the hands of Franklin Baker, and were probably destroyed. Besides addresses, sermons, and pamphlets, Bransby published:

- Maxims, Reflections, and Biographical Anecdotes, 1813.
- Selections for Reading and Recitation, 1814, 2nd edit. 1831, with title The School Anthology.
- A Sketch of the History of Carnarvon Castle, 1829, 3rd edit. 1832.
- An Account of the ... Wreck of the Newry, 1830 (not published; reprinted Christian Reformer, 1830, pp. 486 sq.)
- A Narrative of the ... Wreck of the Rothsay Castle, 1831, (chart; reprinted Christian Reformer, 1831, pp. 405 sq.; this and the foregoing have details derived from personal knowledge).
- Brief Notices of the late Rev. G. Crabbe Carnarvon, 1832.
- The Port Folio ... anecdotes, 1832.
- A Brief Account of the remarkable Fanaticism prevailing at Water Stratford ... 1694, Carnarvon, 1835.
- Description and Historical Sketch of Beddgelert, Carnarvon, 1840.
- Evans' Sketch ... eighteenth edition ... with an account of several new sects, 1842; edition of the compendium of "all religions", first published 1794 by John Evans; Bransby included "Puseyites", and plagiarised several friends.
- A Description of Carnarvon, Carnarvon, 1845.
- A Description of Llanberis, Carnarvon, 1845.

In 1834 Bransby printed in the Christian Reformer (p. 837) a letter from Samuel Taylor Coleridge, 19 January 1798, explaining his withdrawal from "the candidateship for the ministerial office at Shrewsbury." In 1835 he reprinted there (p. 12) an overlooked letter of John Locke; and in 1841 a series of papers, signed "Monticola", contained most of his additions to Evans.
