= Manchester Literary and Philosophical Society =

British learned society, charity and company in Manchester, United Kingdom

- Formation: 28 February 1781; 245 years ago
- Type: Learned society
- Registration no.: 235313
- Legal status: Charity
- Purpose: The Manchester Lit and Phil was established in 1781 with the object of promoting the advancement of education and public interest in any form of literature, science, arts or public affairs.
- Headquarters: Manchester, UK
- Region served: Manchester; Greater Manchester
- Members: 400
- Official language: English
- Activities: Research; Publications; Lectures; Events
- Collections: Library; Archives
- President (99th): Alan Wareham
- Website: www.manliphil.ac.uk

The Manchester Literary and Philosophical Society, popularly known as the Lit. & Phil., is one of the oldest learned societies in the United Kingdom and second oldest provincial learned society (after the Spalding Gentlemen's Society).

Prominent members have included Robert Owen, John Dalton, James Prescott Joule, Sir William Fairbairn, Tom Kilburn, Peter Mark Roget, Sir Ernest Rutherford, Alan Turing, Sir Joseph Whitworth and Dorothy Hodgkin.

== History ==
Dorothy Hodgkin

It was established in February 1781, as the Literary and Philosophical Society of Manchester, by Thomas Percival, Thomas Barnes, Thomas Henry, Thomas Butterworth Bayley and others. The first formal meeting of the society took place on 14 March 1781. Meetings were held in a back room of Cross Street Chapel until December 1799, after which the society moved into its own premises in George Street. John Dalton conducted his experiments at these premises. The society was formed for gentlemen to share advances in Natural Philosophy; there was no word Science in the eighteen century; women have attended meetings since the Nineteenth century.

The Society's original premises on George Street were destroyed during the Manchester Blitz (around January 1941), at which time its library comprised more than 50,000 volumes as well as historic artefacts, portraits, and archives. Its replacement (built in the 1960s) was constructed using high alumina cement (referred to as having "concrete cancer") and was demolished in the 1980s. It became a registered charity (No. 235313) in 1964.

Membership is open to anyone aged over 16 years and lectures are held both in person at venues in Manchester City Centre, and (since 2020) online. There are on average 30 lectures each season and non-members are welcome to attend. The society has more than 400 members.

The Society can be contacted via their website.

== Activities ==
The Society organises a range of lectures, including the Wilde, Joule and Dalton Lectures and three lectures annually specifically for Young People. The most prestigious lectures are the Percival Lecture and the Manchester Lecture, and in some years the most distinguished speakers are presented with the Dalton Medal. Since the local universities ceased offering extra-curricular courses the Lit. & Phil. has seen an increase in both membership and in the attendance of non-members at lectures.

== Members ==
Notable Members, in addition to those above, have included the Nobel Laureates, Sir Robert Robinson, Sir Norman Haworth, and Niels Bohr, as well as Chaim Weizmann, Hans Geiger, Sir William Roberts, Lyon, Lord Playfair, William Gaskell, Sir William de Wiveleslie Abney, Charles William Sutton, Sir James Kay-Shuttleworth, Joseph Jordan, Henry Moseley, Sir Adolphus William Ward, Stanley Jevons, James Prince Lee, Sir Edward Leader Williams, William Axon, Sir Henry Hoyle Howorth, Samuel Greg, Sir Edward Frankland, Samuel Hibbert-Ware and Moses Tyson.

Honorary Members have included Stephen Hawking, William Thomson, Lord Kelvin, Robert Bunsen, Sergey Kapitsa, Dmitri Mendeleev, Sir Cyril Hinshelwood, Dame Kathleen Ollerenshaw, Jöns Jacob Berzelius and John Mercer.

Memoirs and Proceedings
- Language: English
- Edited by: Prof. Graham Booth

Publication details
- History: 1783–present
- Frequency: Annually

Standard abbreviations
- ISO 4: Mem. Proc.

Indexing
- ISSN: 0265-3575

== Memoirs ==
The society's Memoirs and Proceedings (first published in 1783) was, at the time of its launch, the only regular scientific journal in the United Kingdom except for the Philosophical Transactions of the Royal Society.

The Manchester Memoirs has been published continuously since the first edition.

It contains the transactions of the society (most notably the text of many recent lectures) and is distributed to members and to similar institutions and libraries throughout the world by subscription. Copies are also available for purchase by non-members.

== Dalton Medal ==
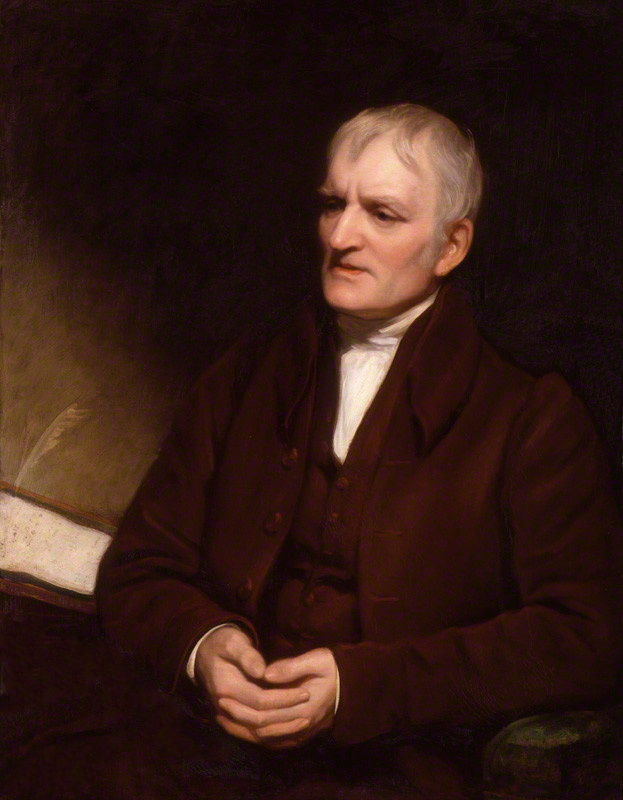
John Dalton by Thomas Phillips, National Portrait Gallery, London (1835)

Jocelyn Bell Burnell receives the Dalton Medal in 2026

Named in honour of the Society's longest-serving President, the scientist John Dalton, the Dalton Medal is a distinction rarely bestowed and is the Society’s highest award. It is given to those who have made a distinguished contribution to science.

Since 1898 the medal has been awarded on only seventeen occasions and most recently in 2023: all the recipients have been Fellows of the Royal Society and many have been Nobel Laureates.

Several of the Dalton Medallists have had connections to Manchester and many have had close associations with the University of Manchester or its predecessor Owens College, Manchester. In many cases, recipients have been connected with the university Departments of Physics and Astronomy, Chemistry and Engineering.

So far, only two women have been a recipient of this medal, the Biochemist and Nobel Laureate Dorothy Hodgkin. and Dame Susan Jocelyn Bell Burnell who in 1967, discovered the Pulsar.

Recipients of the Dalton Medal
No.	Year	Name	Notes
1	1898	Henry Edward Schunck	English chemist and expert on natural dyestuffs who was born in Manchester and lived in Kersal, Salford. He started his studies with William Henry. His laboratory was bequeathed to Owens College which was moved to Burlington Street (1906) and is known as the Schunck Building. The Schunck Library is in the Chemistry Department.
2	1900	Sir Henry Roscoe	English chemist noted for his work on Vanadium and photochemical studies. He was the grandson of William Roscoe of Liverpool (cousin of Stanley Jevons and uncle to Beatrix Potter). Educated at the Liverpool Institute for Boys and with Robert Bunsen in Heidelberg, he was 2nd Professor of Chemistry at Owens College (1857–86).
3	1903	Osborne Reynolds	British engineer, physicist and educator. He was Professor of Civil and Mechanical Engineering at Owens College, Manchester (1868–1904).
4	1919	Sir Ernest Rutherford	New Zealand physicist and is considered to be the father of nuclear physics. He was Langworthy Professor of Physics at the University of Manchester (1907–19) where he split the atom in a building on Coupland Street. He was awarded the Nobel Prize in Chemistry (1908).
5	1931	Sir Joseph 'J. J.' Thomson	English experimental physicist born in Cheetham Hill, Manchester who enrolled at Owens College, Manchester (1870). He was awarded the Nobel Prize in Physics (1906). His son, Professor Sir George Paget Thomson, was awarded the Nobel Prize for Physics (1937).
6	1942	Sir Lawrence Bragg	Australian-born British physicist and X-ray crystallographer. He was awarded the Nobel Prize in Physics (1915), with his father, and became its youngest ever recipient. He was Langworthy Professor of Physics at the University of Manchester (1919–37).
7	1948	Patrick Blackett	English experimental physicist and cosmologist. He was Langworthy Professor of Physics at the University of Manchester (1937–53). He was awarded the Nobel Prize in Physics (1948).
8	1966	Sir Cyril Hinshelwood	English physical chemist awarded the Nobel Prize in Chemistry (1956).
9	1981	Dorothy Hodgkin	British biochemist who developed protein crystallography and was awarded the Nobel Prize in Chemistry (1964).
10	1997	Sir Harold Kroto	English chemist famous for his discovery of fullerenes and most famously buckminsterfullerene C60 (buckyballs). Educated at the University of Sheffield, he was a great promoter of science education (particularly for young people) and an ambassador for public engagement with science. He was awarded the Nobel Prize in Chemistry (1996).
11	2002	Sir Walter Bodmer	German-born British human geneticist who was educated at Manchester Grammar School.
12	2005	Sir Roger Penrose	English mathematical physicist, mathematician and philosopher of science, awarded the Nobel Prize in Physics (2020).
13	2009	Sir Bernard Lovell	English physicist and radio astronomer who established (and was the first Director of) the Jodrell Bank Observatory at the University of Manchester.
14	2012	Martin, Lord Rees of Ludlow	British cosmologist and astrophysicist. Born in Shropshire, he has been Astronomer Royal since 1995.
15	2016	Sir Konstantin Novoselov	Russian-British physicist, and Langworthy Professor in the School of Physics and Astronomy at the University of Manchester. He was awarded the Nobel Prize in Physics (2010).
16	2023	Sir Paul Nurse	British geneticist. He was awarded the Nobel Prize in Physiology or Medicine (2001).
17	2026	Dame Jocelyn Bell Burnell	Northern Irish astrophysicist and radio astronomer who in 1967, discovered the Pulsar.

== Named Lectures ==
The society hold a number of named lectures which celebrate previous members or people associated with Manchester. Historically the lecturers are named as The Wilde lecture, The Ramsden Lecture, The Courtauld lecture, The McCurdy lecture, The Joule Lecture and the Percival Lecture. In 2026 The Frederick Douglass Lecture was inaugurated.

Named Lectures
Name	First Date	Lecturer	Title	Notes
Wilde Lecture	1898	Sir G. G. STOKES, Bart., F.R.S.	On the Nature of the Rontgen Rays.	
Frederick Douglass Lecture	2026	David Olusoga	Frederick Douglass – A GLOBAL LIFE	

== Officers ==
=== Presidents ===
- 1781–82 Peter Mainwaring
- 1781–89 James Massey
- 1782–86 Dr Thomas Percival (I)
- 1789–1804 Dr Thomas Percival (II)
- 1805–07 Rev. George Walker
- 1807–09 Thomas Henry (I)
- 1809 Dr John Hull
- 1809–16 Thomas Henry (II)
- 1816–44 John Dalton
- 1844–47 Dr Edward Holme
- 1848–50 Eaton Hodgkinson
- 1851–54 John Moore
- 1855–59 Sir William Fairbairn, Bt
- 1860–62 James Prescott Joule (I)
- 1862–64 Edward William Binney (I)
- 1864–66 Dr Robert Angus Smith
- 1866–68 Dr Henry Edward Schunck (I)
- 1868–70 James Prescott Joule (II)
- 1870–72 Edward William Binney (II)
- 1872–74 James Prescott Joule (III)
- 1874–76 Dr Henry Edward Schunck (II)
- 1876–78 Edward William Binney (III)
- 1878–80 James Prescott Joule (IV)
- 1880–82 Edward William Binney (IV)
- 1882–84 Sir Henry Enfield Roscoe
- 1884–86 William Crawford Williamson
- 1886–87 Robert Dukinfield Darbishire
- 1887–88 Balfour Stewart
- 1888–90 Osborne Reynolds
- 1890–92 Dr Henry Edward Schunck (III)
- 1892–94 Prof. Sir Arthur Schuster
- 1894–96 Henry Wilde
- 1896–97 Dr Henry Edward Schunck (IV)
- 1897–99 James Cosmo Melvill
- 1899–1901 Prof. Sir Horace Lamb
- 1901–03 Charles Bailey
- 1903–05 Prof. Sir William Boyd Dawkins
- 1905–07 Sir William Henry Bailey
- 1907–09 Prof. Harold Baily Dixon (I)
- 1909–11 Francis Jones
- 1911–13 Prof. Frederick Ernest Weiss
- 1913–15 Francis Nicholson
- 1915–17 Prof. Sydney John Hickson
- 1917–19 William Thomson
- 1919 Prof. Sir Grafton Elliot Smith
- 1919–21 Prof. Sir Henry Alexander Miers
- 1921–23 Thomas Alfred Coward
- 1923–25 Prof. Harold Baily Dixon (II)
- 1925 Rev. Aloysius Laurence Cortie
- 1925–27 Herbert Levinstein
- 1927–29 Prof. Sir William Lawrence Bragg
- 1929–31 Charles Edmond Stromeyer
- 1931–33 Prof. Bernard Mouat Jones
- 1933–35 John Allan
- 1935–37 Prof. Reginald William James
- 1937–39 Robert Henry Clayton
- 1939–40 Prof. Douglas Rayner Hartree
- 1940–44 Prof. Herbert John Fleure
- 1944–46 Prof. Michael Polanyi
- 1946–48 Prof. Thomas B. L. Webster
- 1949–50 Dr Eric John Francis James
- 1950–52 Horace Hayhurst (I)
- 1952–54 Prof. Sir Geoffrey Jefferson
- 1954–56 Sir Peter Percy F. R. Venables
- 1956–58 Dr F. C. Toy
- 1958–60 C. E. Young
- 1960–62 Prof. Henry Solomon Lipson (I)
- 1962–64 Prof. Leonard Cohen
- 1964–66 Margaret Pilkington
- 1966–67 Horace Hayhurst (II)
- 1967–69 A. Brian L. Rodgers
- 1969–71 Dr George Norman Burkhardt
- 1971–73 Dr George James Kynch
- 1973–75 Dr Edward Noah Abrahart
- 1975–77 Anthony Edmund Rivers Goulty
- 1977–79 Prof. Henry Solomon Lipson (II)
- 1979–81 Harry M. Fairhurst
- 1981–83 David G. Wilson
- 1983–85 Dr Lionel J. R. Postle
- 1985–87 Prof. Sir Netar P. Mallick (I)
- 1987–89 Dr Brian S. H. Rarity
- 1989–91 Philip G. Livesey
- 1991–93 Prof. Donald S. L. Cardwell
- 1993–95 Dr Edward Fletcher Cass
- 1995–97 Prof. Alexander Donnachie
- 1997–99 Dianne Wilson
- 1999–2001 Iain Erskine Gillespie
- 2001–03 Angus G. D. Yeaman
- 2003–05 Keith D. Buckley
- 2005–07 Vivienne Blackburn
- 2007–09 Mary, Lady Mallick
- 2009–11 David J. Higginson
- 2011–14 Prof. Kenneth M. Letherman
- 2014–16 Prof. Sir Netar P. Mallick (II)
- 2016–18 Dr Diana M. Leitch
- 2018–21 Dr Susan R. Hilton
- 2021–23 Ian E. Cameron
- 2023–25 Peter D. Wright
- 2025–Present Alan Wareham

=== Secretaries ===
- 1781–85 Dr George Bew
- 1781–88 Thomas Henry
- 1785–87 Rev. Dr Thomas Barnes
- 1787–92 Dr John Ferriar
- 1789–91 James Watt Jnr
- 1791–93 William Simmons
- 1792–93 Thomas Henry Jnr
- 1793–94 Samuel Harvey
- 1793–96 Dr Samuel Argent Bardsley
- 1794–98 Dr Edward Holme
- 1797–1800 William Henry
- 1798–1806 Dr John Hull
- 1800–09 John Dalton
- 1807–16 Rev. William Johns
- 1809–10 Dr William Winstanley
- 1810–20 John Atkinson Ransome (I)
- 1817–22 Thomas Henry Robinson
- 1821–42 Peter Clare
- 1822–37 Rev. John James Tayler
- 1838–44 Joseph Atkinson Ransome (II)
- 1843–48 John Davies
- 1844–46 John Holt Stanway
- 1846–50 James Prescott Joule
- 1848–52 Edward William Binney
- 1851–55 Rev. Henry Halford Jones
- 1852–57 Dr Robert Angus Smith
- 1855–61 Dr Henry Edward Schunck
- 1857–60 Prof. Richard Copley Christie
- 1860–74 Sir Henry Enfield Roscoe
- 1861–85 Joseph Baxendell
- 1874–84 Prof. Osborne Reynolds
- 1884–86 James Thomson Bottomley
- 1885–88 Prof. Sir Arthur Schuster
- 1886–96 Frederick James Faraday
- 1888–1900 Reginald Felix Gwyther
- 1896–1906 Francis Jones
- 1900–01 Sir Alfred William Flux
- 1901–05 Charles H. Lees
- 1905–08 Prof. Frederick William Gamble
- 1906–19 R. L. Taylor
- 1908–09 Charles Gordon Hewitt
- 1909–20 Henry George Albert Hickling
- 1919–23 Dr Hubert Frank Coward
- 1920–24 Prof. Tom Hatherley Pear
- 1923–29 John Allan
- 1924–27 William Henry Lang
- 1927–29 Edward Arthur Milne
- 1929–36 D. C. Henry
- 1929–39 William Bourke Wright
- 1937–38 Bertha Swirles
- 1938–40 William H. Taylor
- 1939–43 P. Guthlac Jones
- 1940–45 C. M. Legge
- 1943–46 D. E. Wheeler
- 1945–47 Ross Douglas Waller
- 1946–47 J. T. Kendall
- 1947–51 J. G. Roger
- 1947–56 G. F. Clayton
- 1951–58 Frank Willett
- 1956–64 Louis Cohen
- 1958–62 Dr G. T. Ashley
- 1962–71 Dr R. G. Cox
- 1964–74 Anthony Edmund Rivers Goulty
- 1971–85 Prof. Donald S. L. Cardwell
- 1974–79 R. G. Saxon
- 1980–81 Dr Lionel J. R. Postle
- 1981–87 Dr Brian S. H. Rarity
- 1985–87 Albert Leslie Smyth (I)
- 1987–90 Joyce Lindley Parker
- 1988–92 Albert Leslie Smyth (II)
- 1990–91 Norman H. Pendlebury
- 1991–95 Charles J. E. Kempster
- 1992–93 Rajkumari Williamson
- 1993–97 Cllr Dianne E. Wilson
- 1995–97 Susan C. Diggines
- 1997–2001 Dr Ronald E. Catlow
- 1997–2002 Joan Livesey
- 2001–02 Dr Jean M. Thomson
- 2001–04 Prof. Alexander Donnachie
- 2004–05 Dr John J. Moscrop
- 2005–06 Dr Ruth A. Symes
- 2005–07 Jane F. Hamilton
- 2005–08 Patricia M. Verdin
- 2008–09 Katherine Sylvia Pullan
- 2008–11 Nigel Peter Barnes
- 2009–11 Derek Caldwell
- 2012–16 John Spencer Buckley
- 2014–16 David Astbury
- 2016–20 Peter G. Hilton
- 2020–21 Dr Robert E. Stansfield-Cudworth
- 2021–22 Dr F. Peter Fenn
- 2022–23 Niall Power
- 2023–25 Çiğdem Balim
- 2025–present Susan M. Cameron
- 2025–present Rowan J. Moony

=== Treasurers ===
- 1783–89 Isaac Moss
- 1790–91 Thomas Maxwell
- 1791–95 Benjamin Arthur Heywood
- 1796–1814 Nathaniel Heywood
- 1815–50 Sir Benjamin Heywood, Bt
- 1851–54 George Wareing Ormerod
- 1855–62 Henry Mere Ormerod
- 1863–68 Robert Worthington
- 1868–73 Thomas Carrick
- 1873–76 Samuel Broughton
- 1877–95 Charles Bailey (I)
- 1896–1901 John Jackson Ashworth
- 1901–02 Charles Bailey (II)
- 1902–10 Arthur McDougall
- 1910–21 W. Henry Todd
- 1921–37 Robert Henry Clayton (I)
- 1937–39 Allan McLean Ranft
- 1939–46 Robert Henry Clayton (II)
- 1946–67 Horace Hayhurst
- 1967–69 G. F. Peake
- 1969–71 Frank Butler
- 1971–75 Dr F. H. Kroch
- 1975–81 D. G. Wilson
- 1981–88 Philip G. Livesey
- 1982–90 Edward Fletcher Cass
- 1988–95 Philip A. Hine
- 1994–96 Alison J. Lever
- 1996–2013 Michael N. G. Evans
- 2000–7 Antony G. P. Timmins
- 2007–11 Ian A. Ross
- 2013–16 David S. Brown
- 2014–15 David Costley-Wood
- 2016–21 Greg Mauchline
- 2016–22 Trevor M. E. Rees
- 2022–24 Christine Mbarga
- 2024–present Alison A. Carey
- 2024–present Peter A. G. F. Carstensen

== See also ==
- List of societies for education in Manchester
- Spalding Gentlemen's Society
- The Literary and Philosophical Society of Newcastle Upon Tyne
