= Charles Lloyd (minister) =

Charles Lloyd LL.D. (1766–1829) was a Welsh dissenter and schoolmaster.

== Life ==
The third son of David Lloyd, Presbyterian minister at Llwyn-rhyd-owen, Cardiganshire, he was born there on 18 December 1766. On his father's death (4 February 1779, aged 54) his education for the ministry was undertaken by his uncle, John Lloyd of Coed-lanau; but that support provided only for schooling (1779–84) under David Davis, who had been his father's colleague. In the autumn of 1784 he entered with an exhibition the Presbyterian academy, then at Swansea, under Solomon Harries (1726–1785), who was succeeded in 1785 by Josiah Rees and Thomas Lloyd, a first cousin. William Howell became theological tutor in 1786; and when the other tutors established a grammar school, preparatory to the academy, Lloyd was appointed afternoon teacher. Among his fellow-students was Lewis Loyd, father of Samuel Jones Loyd.

Leaving the academy (1788) in poor health, Lloyd went to Hotwells, near Bristol, where he was supported by John Wright, M.D., and his brother, Thomas Wright, Presbyterian minister at Lewin's Mead, Bristol: almost the only persons whom Lloyd, in his autobiography, fails to censure. Through the influence of Nathaniel Philipps, Presbyterian minister at Derby, Lloyd was elected minister, in August 1788, of the Oak Street congregation, Evesham, Worcestershire; he was at this time judged a "moderately high Arian". He started a Sunday school and an evening service, and increased his congregation from forty to two hundred. He wished, however, to administer the sacraments without being ordained; the congregation objected; he consulted Joseph Priestley, then in Birmingham, who, to his surprise, urged him to be ordained. The congregation gave in on cost grounds.

Shortly afterwards Lloyd began to have doubts about infant baptism, and on 3 April 1790 proposed to omit this rite or resign; his resignation was accepted. Through Joshua Toulmin he was put in charge of a General Baptist congregation at Ditchling, Sussex, and went there after visiting London in May 1790. At Ditchling he received adult baptism, but refused imposition of hands, then usual among General Baptists; he also again declined ordination. He cultivated extempore preaching.

At the beginning of 1792 Lloyd started a boarding-school, and married in the summer. Early in 1793 he left the ministry and moved his school to Exeter, where it ran for eight years. His first pupil was John Kenrick, who described the school as held in a "large ancient house near Palace Gate". Another pupil was William Gibbs.

Lloyd next turned farmer (1799) on the small estate of Coed-lannau-vawr, Cardiganshire, probably his through his brother Richard, who died on 27 September 1797, aged 37. Agriculture exhausted his savings. The chance to act as colleague in the congregation that had been his father's was closed to him, as David Davis, opposed the election of a Socinian and Baptist; by this time, however, Lloyd had rejected the rite of baptism in any form, as an institution confined to the apostolic age. A secession from Llwyn-rhyd-owen chose him as their pastor, and built two small chapels at Capel-y-groes (with a membership of 80) and Pant-y-defaid (with a membership of 60). His stay in Cardiganshire did not last long. Leaving his congregations to the care of John James, he moved in 1803 to Palgrave in Suffolk, running a school and taking charge of a Presbyterian congregation (5 April 1803 to 4 October 1811). In 1809 he received the diploma of LL.D. from Glasgow University.

From Palgrave Lloyd moved on to London, where for many years he kept a school in Keppel Street. He died on a visit to relatives near Lampeter, Cardiganshire, on 23 May 1829, aged 62, and was buried at Llanwenog; there was a marble tablet to his memory placed in the church. As a teacher, Lloyd's attention to prosody gained him the nickname of "Quantity Doctor".

== Works ==
Lloyd began writing for a periodical in 1792, on the slave trade and other topics. He published:

- Two Sermons on Christian Zeal, 1808.
- Observations on the Choice of a School, 1812.
- Particulars of the Life of a Dissenting Minister. Written by himself, [1813], anonymous. Lloyd subsequently tried to suppress this work, which mentions few names but sketches many characters, often with hostility. It has traditionally been compared with The Autobiography of a Dissenting Minister (1834) by William Pitt Scargill, which is fictional.
- Travels at Home, 1814, 2 vols.
- The Monthly Repository Extraordinary, 1819 (Aspland).
- The Epistles of St. Paul … and … St. James; … a New Version … by Philalethes, 1819; identified as Lloyd's by John Kentish in the Monthly Repository (1813–14).

Lloyd, as a Greek scholar, controverted some of the positions of John Jones, with whom he is said to have played cards and quarrelled every evening. Other contributions by Lloyd, in criticism of Lant Carpenter, were in the Monthly Repository, 1815.

== Family ==
By his first wife, Letty, who died at Palgrave on 11 December 1808, Lloyd had several children. By a second marriage with Sara Maria Smith, he had a son, Francis Vaughan (born 1811).

== Notes ==
Attribution

This article incorporates text from a publication now in the public domain: Lee, Sidney, ed. (1893). "Lloyd, Charles (1766-1829)". Dictionary of National Biography. Vol. 33. London: Smith, Elder & Co.
