= John Ferriar =

British writer and physician

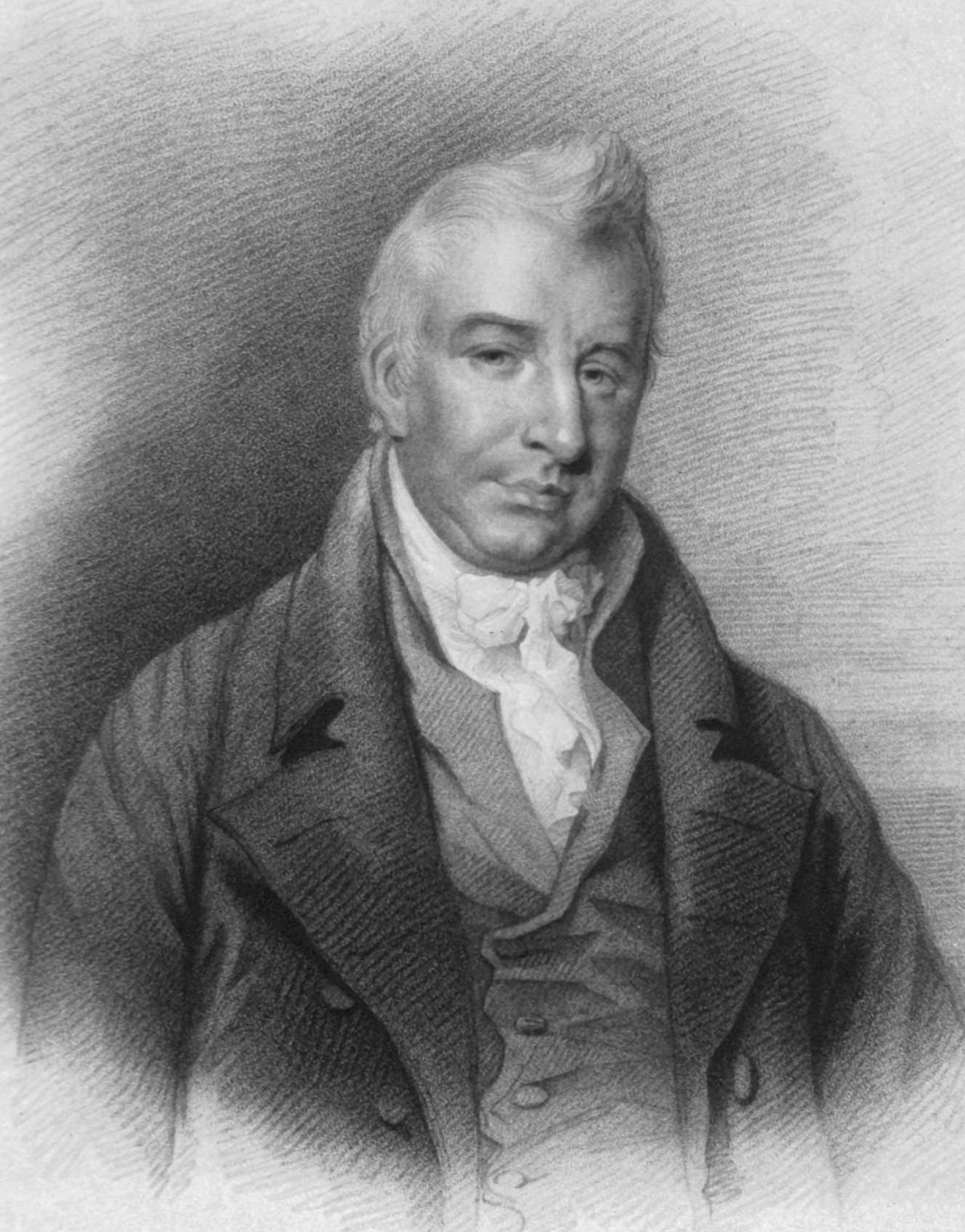
- John Ferriar
- Born: 1761; Jedburgh, Roxburghshire
- Died: 4 February 1815 (aged 53–54); Manchester, Lancashire
- Education: University of Edinburgh
- Occupations: Physician; Poet

John Ferriar (1761 – 4 February 1815) was a Scottish physician and a poet, most noted for his leadership of the Manchester Infirmary, and his studies of the causes of diseases such as typhoid.

== Background ==
Ferriar was born near Jedburgh, Roxburghshire in 1761. He obtained his MD at the University of Edinburgh in 1781, and became a physician (and later senior physician) at the Manchester Infirmary, from 1789 until 1815. He was a founder of the Portico Library and acted as its first Chairman alongside its first Secretary, Peter Mark Roget. He was elected to membership of the Manchester Literary and Philosophical Society on 12 April 1786 and Secretary of the Society 1787–92

== Manchester Board of Health ==
In 1795, he helped to set up a Board of Health in Manchester which rented houses in Portland Street for use as a fever hospital. He described to the Committee for the Regulation of the Police the appalling living conditions of the poor in cellars without lighting, sanitation or ventilation. People newly arrived from the country were particularly vulnerable to fevers. Consequently, he introduced many sanitary reforms.

His obituary, published in 1815, read:

Died, on the 4th of February, aged 52, JOHN FERRIAR, M. D. Senior Physician of the Manchester Infirmary. The eminent rank which he held in his profession, not only in that town and its immediate neighbourhood, but through a widely extended district of the surrounding country, was founded on long and general experience of the efficacy of his counsels. He was endowed by nature with an acute and vigorous understanding, which he had matured by a life of diligent study, and of careful and well-digested observation, into a judgment unusually correct and prompt in its decisions. The purposes of his sagacious mind were pursued, also, with a steadiness of determination which generally secured their accomplishment; and unexpected difficulties, in the treatment of diseases, he encountered with firmness, and with great fertility of invention. As a professional author he had obtained a high station, and the world is indebted to him for a large fund of valuable knowledge, conveyed in a style, which, for perspicuity, aud for manly strength and simplicity, deserves to be proposed as a model to medical writers. His character as a polite scholar will be preserved, in the literary annals of his country, by writings, in which he has displayed correct taste, extensive and various readings and original views of the subjects of his investigations. In the relations of private life he will long be remembered as a man of inflexible honour and integrity; a faithful arid steady friend; find a tender and most indulgent parent.

== Works ==
His essay on Massinger was reprinted in Gifford's edition (1805), and his other published works includes Medical Histories and Reflections 1792-5-8, and Illustrations of Sterne 1798. In 1813, he also published An essay towards a theory of apparitions in which he argued that apparitions could be explained by optical illusions. A review of this essay appears in The Quarterly.

Professional and academic associations
Preceded by Thomas Barnes	Secretary of the Manchester Literary and Philosophical Society; 1787–92	Succeeded by James Watt Jnr
