= William Henry (chemist) =

British chemist who formulated the law on the solubility of gases into liquids

William Henry FRS
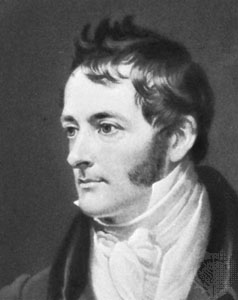
- Born: 12 December 1774; Manchester, England
- Died: 2 September 1836 (aged 61); Pendlebury, England
- Education: University of Edinburgh
- Known for: Henry's law
- Awards: Copley Medal (1808)
- Scientific career
- Fields: Chemistry; Physician

William Henry FRS (12 December 1774 – 2 September 1836) was an English chemist. He was the son of Thomas Henry and was born in Manchester England. He developed what is known today as Henry's Law.

== Life ==
William Henry was apprenticed to Thomas Percival and later worked with John Ferriar & John Huit at the Manchesters Infirmary. He began to study medicine at University of Edinburgh in 1795, taking his medical in 1807, but ill-health (Note: An injury in childhood caused him intermittent pain throughout his life.) interrupted his practice as a physician, and he devoted his time mainly to chemical research, especially with regard to gases. One of his best-known papers (published in Philosophical Transactions of the Royal Society, 1803) describes experiments on the quantity of gases absorbed by water at different temperatures and under different pressures. His results are known today as Henry's law. His other papers deal with gas-analysis, fire-damp, illuminating gas, the composition of hydrochloric acid and of ammonia, urinary and other morbid concretions, and the disinfecting powers of heat. His Elements of Experimental Chemistry (1799) enjoyed considerable vogue in its day, going through eleven editions in 30 years. He was one of the founders of the Mechanics' Institute, the original precursor of University of Manchester Institute of Science and Technology.

He was elected a Fellow of the Royal Society in February 1809, having been awarded their prestigious Copley Medal in 1808. and elected to the Manchester Literary and Philosophical Society on 2.April 1796.

He shot himself in his private chapel at Pendlebury, near Manchester, in 1836.

== Notes ==
Professional and academic associations
Preceded by Edward Holme	Secretary of the Manchester Literary and Philosophical Society; 1797–1800	Succeeded by John Hull
