= Thomas Barnes (Unitarian) =

English Unitarian minister and educational reformer (1747–1810)

The Reverend Thomas Barnes
- Born: 13 February 1747; Warrington, Cheshire, England
- Died: 27 June 1810 (aged 63)
- Education: Warrington Academy
- Occupations: Unitarian minister; Educational reformer

Thomas Barnes (1747–1810) was an English Unitarian minister and educational reformer.

== Background ==
He was the son of William Barnes, of Warrington. His mother was Elizabeth, daughter of the Rev. Thomas Blinston, of Wigan. He was born on 13 February 1747, and he lost his father when he was in his third year. He received his elementary education at Warrington grammar school, and later in the Warrington Academy. He was subsequently licensed as a preacher of the gospel, and became minister of the congregation at Cockey Moor (Ainsworth, near Bolton) in 1768. He remained there for eleven years. When he left, the numbers in attendance had trebled.

== Career ==
In 1780 he became the minister of Cross Street Chapel at Manchester. It was at the time the largest, wealthiest, and most influential congregation of Dissenters in the town and district, and he remained there for thirty years until his death. In 1781, together with Thomas Percival and Thomas Henry, he founded the Literary and Philosophical Society of Manchester; became one of its two secretaries, and took a leading part, for several years, in its meetings and transactions. In 1783 he read a paper before the society and advocated the extension of liberal education in Manchester. He anticipated a provision for the instruction of youths of the town between their leaving a grammar school and entering into business. His plan was approved; a seminary, called ‘The College of Arts and Sciences,’ was established, and various men of special qualifications were placed on its staff of instructors. Barnes himself delivered a course of lectures on moral philosophy, and a second on commerce. The impact of the institution was less than hoped, however. He was elected to the American Philosophical Society in 1787.

Barnes was then induced, in association with his ministerial colleague, the Rev. Mr. Harrison, to undertake the government of Manchester College. He became its principal, for about twelve years. In 1798 he retired on account of failing strength, but was still involved in local health bodies. He died on 27 June 1810.

== Works ==
His essays, which were published in the early volumes of the Literary and Philosophical Society, services in the college, won for him in 1784 the honorary degree of Doctor of Divinity from the University of Edinburgh. Barnes published A Funeral Sermon on the Death of the Rev. Thomas Threlkeld, of Rochdale, and was a contributor (anonymously) to contemporary periodicals. His Discourse upon the Commencement of the Academy, published in 1786, was reprinted in 1806.

Professional and academic associations
Preceded by Thomas Henry	Secretary of the Manchester Literary and Philosophical Society; 1785–87	Succeeded by John Ferriar
