= Charles Wellbeloved =

English Unitarian divine and archaeologist

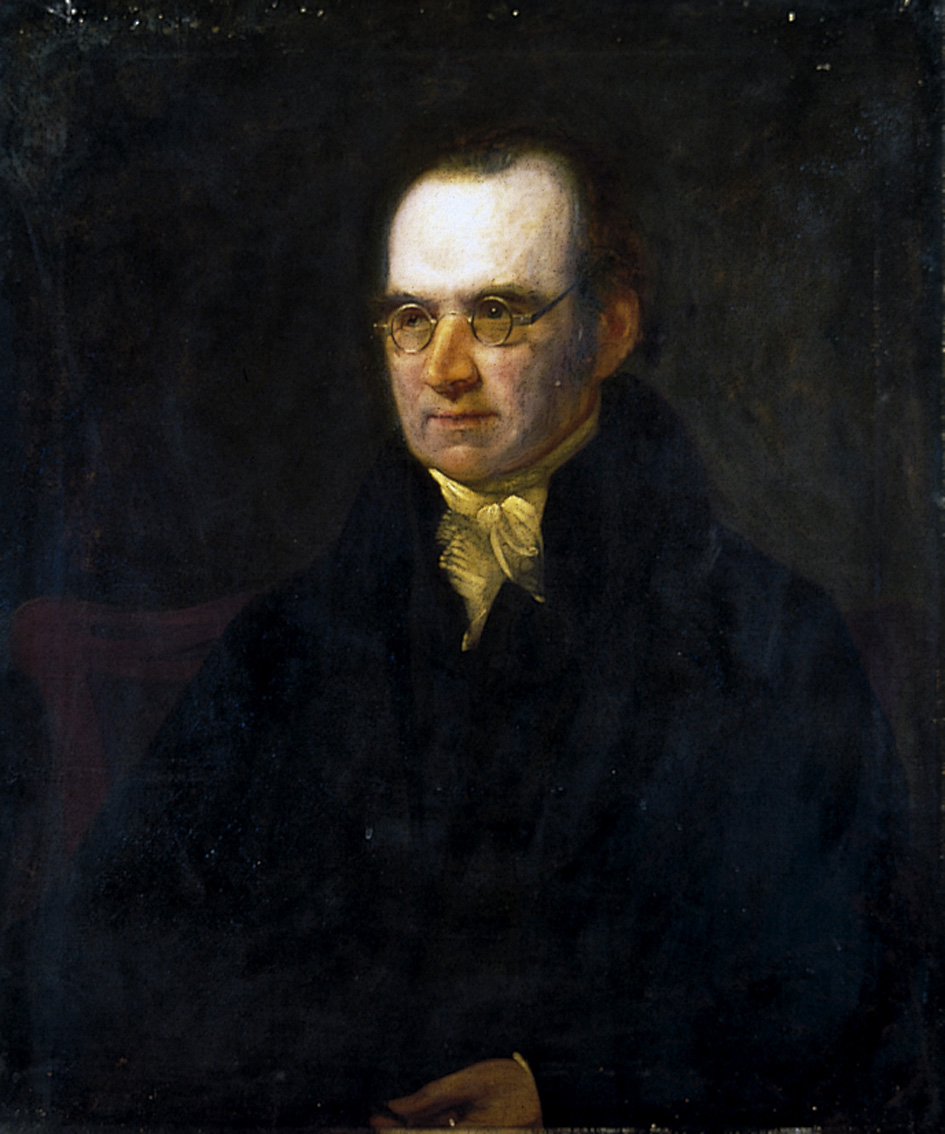
- Portrait of Charles Wellbeloved
- Born: 6 April 1769; Denmark Street, St Giles, London, England
- Died: 29 August 1858 (aged 89); Monkgate, York, England

Charles Wellbeloved (6 April 1769 – 29 August 1858) was an English Unitarian divine and archaeologist.

== Biography ==
Charles Wellbeloved, only child of John Wellbeloved (1742–1787), by his wife Elizabeth Plaw, was born in Denmark Street, St Giles, London, on 6 April 1769, and baptised on 25 April at St. Giles-in-the-Fields. Owing to domestic unhappiness he was brought up from the age of four by his grandfather, Charles Wellbeloved (1713–1782), a country gentleman at Mortlake, Surrey, an Anglican, and the friend and follower of John Wesley. He got the best part of his early education from a clergyman named Delafosse at Richmond. In 1783 he was placed with a firm of drapers on Holborn Hill, but only learned "how to tie up a parcel".

In 1785 he became a student at Homerton Academy under Benjamin Davies. Among his fellow-students were William Field and David Jones (1765–1816). Jones was expelled for heresy in 1786; his opinions had influenced Wellbeloved, who was allowed to finish the session of 1787, but not to return. In September 1787 he followed Jones to New College, Hackney, under Abraham Rees, the cyclopædist, and Andrew Kippis, and subsequently (1789) under Thomas Belsham and (1790) Gilbert Wakefield. Here he formed a close friendship with Arthur Aikin, who entered in 1789. He attended the ministry of Richard Price (1723–1791).

He married his wife Ann Kinder (d. 31 January 1823) on 1 July 1793, at St. Mary's, Stoke Newington, with whom he had several children. Their youngest son, Robert Wellbeloved (15 July 1803 – 21 February 1856), married heiress Sarah Scott on 17 February 1830 and assumed the name and arms of Scott on her father's death in 1832. Robert was a deputy-lieutenant for Worcestershire and M.P. for Walsall (1841–46). His youngest daughter, Emma (d. 29 July 1842), married (1831) Sir James Carter, chief justice of New Brunswick.

=== Ecclesiastical career ===
Wellbeloved's first sermon was preached at Walthamstow on 13 November 1791. Shortly afterwards he received through Michael Maurice, father of [John] Frederick Denison Maurice, an invitation to become assistant to Newcome Cappe at St Saviourgate Chapel, York. He accepted on 23 January 1792, and began his duties at York on 5 February. In 1798, he purchased Middleton House in the city. In 1801 he became sole minister on Cappe's death. The chief feature of his exegetical work was his treatment of prophecy, limiting the range of its prediction, confining that of Hebrew prophecy to the age of its production, and bounding our Lord's predictions by the destruction of Jerusalem. He broke with the Priestley school, rejecting a general resurrection and fixing the last judgment at death. In these and other points he closely followed the system of Newcome Cappe, but his careful avoidance of dogmatism left his pupils free, and none of them followed him into ‘Cappism.’ Among his coadjutors were Theophilus Browne, William Turner and William Hincks. From 1810 he had the invaluable co-operation of John Kenrick, who married his elder daughter Lætitia.

In 1794 he began to take pupils into a Sunday school he had founded. He was invited in November 1797 (after Belsham had declined) to succeed Thomas Barnes (1747–1810) as divinity tutor in the Manchester academy. Barnes, an evangelical Arian, gave him no encouragement, but he did not reject the offer till February 1798; it was accepted soon after by George Walker. On Walker's resignation the trustees proposed (25 March 1803) to remove the institution to York if Wellbeloved would become its director. He agreed (11 April), and from September 1803 to June 1840 the institution was known as Manchester College, York, which eventually became Harris Manchester College, Oxford. Its management was retained by a committee, meeting ordinarily in Manchester. For thirty-seven years Wellbeloved discharged the duties of the college's divinity chair in a spirit described by Dr. James Martineau, his pupil, as "candid and catholic, simple and thorough". He followed the method which Richard Watson (1737–1816) had introduced at Cambridge, discarding systematic theology and substituting biblical exegesis.

Presentations of plate (1840) and of 1,000l (1843) were made to him on resigning his divinity chair. He retained his connection with his chapel until his death, officiating occasionally until 1853, having as assistants John Wright (1845–46) and Henry Vaughan Palmer (1846–58). He died at his residence, Monkgate, York, on 29 August 1858, and was buried (3 September) in the graveyard of St. Saviourgate Chapel; a memorial tablet is in the chapel. His portrait, painted in 1826 by James Lonsdale, was engraved by Samuel Cousins.

=== Antiquarian ===
Wellbeloved was the Honorary Curator of Antiquities for the Yorkshire Philosophical Society from 1823 until his death in 1858, overseeing the exhibition and interpretation of antiquities in the Yorkshire Museum from its opening in 1830. Between 1827 and 1829 he oversaw excavations in the cloister of St Mary's Abbey, York preparatory to digging the Yorkshire Museum's foundation.

== Published works ==
Proposals for editing a family bible were made to Wellbeloved (14 March 1814) by David Eaton (1771–1829), then a bookseller in Holborn in succession to William Vidler. The prospectus (May 1814) announced a revised translation with commentary. Between 1819 and 1838 nine parts were issued in large quarto, containing the Pentateuch, Job, Psalms, Proverbs, Ecclesiastes, and Canticles. The text was reprinted, with Wellbeloved's revised version of Joshua, Judges, Ruth, and the Minor Prophets, in ‘The Holy Scriptures of the Old Covenant,’ 1859–62, 3 vols. 8vo. In 1823 he took up a controversy, begun by Thomas Thrush (1761–1843), with Francis Wrangham Sydney Smith wrote: "If I had a cause to gain I would fee Mr. Wellbeloved to plead for me, and double fee Mr. Wrangham to plead against me." As a sub-trustee of the Sarah Hewley Trust he was involved in the suit (1830–42) which removed Unitarians from its management and benefits.

He was one of the founders of the York Subscription Library (1794), the Yorkshire Philosophical Society (1822), and the York Institute (1827), and devoted much time to the archaeology of York. His archaeological work included excavation in advance of the construction of the Yorkshire Museum and Gardens, the history of which is published in A Handbook to the Antiquities in the Grounds and Museum of the Yorkshire Philosophical Society. After the fire of 2 February 1829 he took a leading part in raising funds for the restoration of the minster, and in opposing the removal of the choir-screen. The description of the minster in Lewis's Topographical Dictionary, the article 'York' in the Penny Cyclopædia, and a Guide (1804) to York Minster are from his pen. His Eburacum, or York under the Romans (York, 1842, 8vo), gives the substance of his previous papers and lectures on the subject.

Besides the works mentioned above, and single sermons and pamphlets, he published:

- Devotional Exercises, 1801, 12mo; 8th edit. 1832.
- Memoirs of … Rev. W[illiam] Wood, 1809, 8vo. Regarding the botanist, minister William Wood
- Three Letters … to Francis Wrangham, 1823, 8vo; 2nd edit. same year.
- Three Additional Letters, 1824, 8vo.
- Memoir’ prefixed to ‘Sermons, 1826, 8vo, by Thomas Watson.
- Account of … the Abbey of St. Mary, York, in Vetusta Monumenta, 1829, vol. v. fol.
- Memoir of Thomas Thrush, 1845, 8vo.
- Descriptive Account of the Antiquities in the Museum of the Yorkshire Philosophical Society, 1852, 8vo; 3rd edit. 1858.

He contributed to the Yorkshire Repository, 1794, 12mo; the Annual Review, 1802–8; and the Proceedings of the Yorkshire Philosophical Society, 1855, vol. i.
