= Royal Manchester Institution =

Learned society promoting the arts in Manchester, England

- Established: 1823
- Location: Manchester, United Kingdom
- Type: Contemporary art gallery

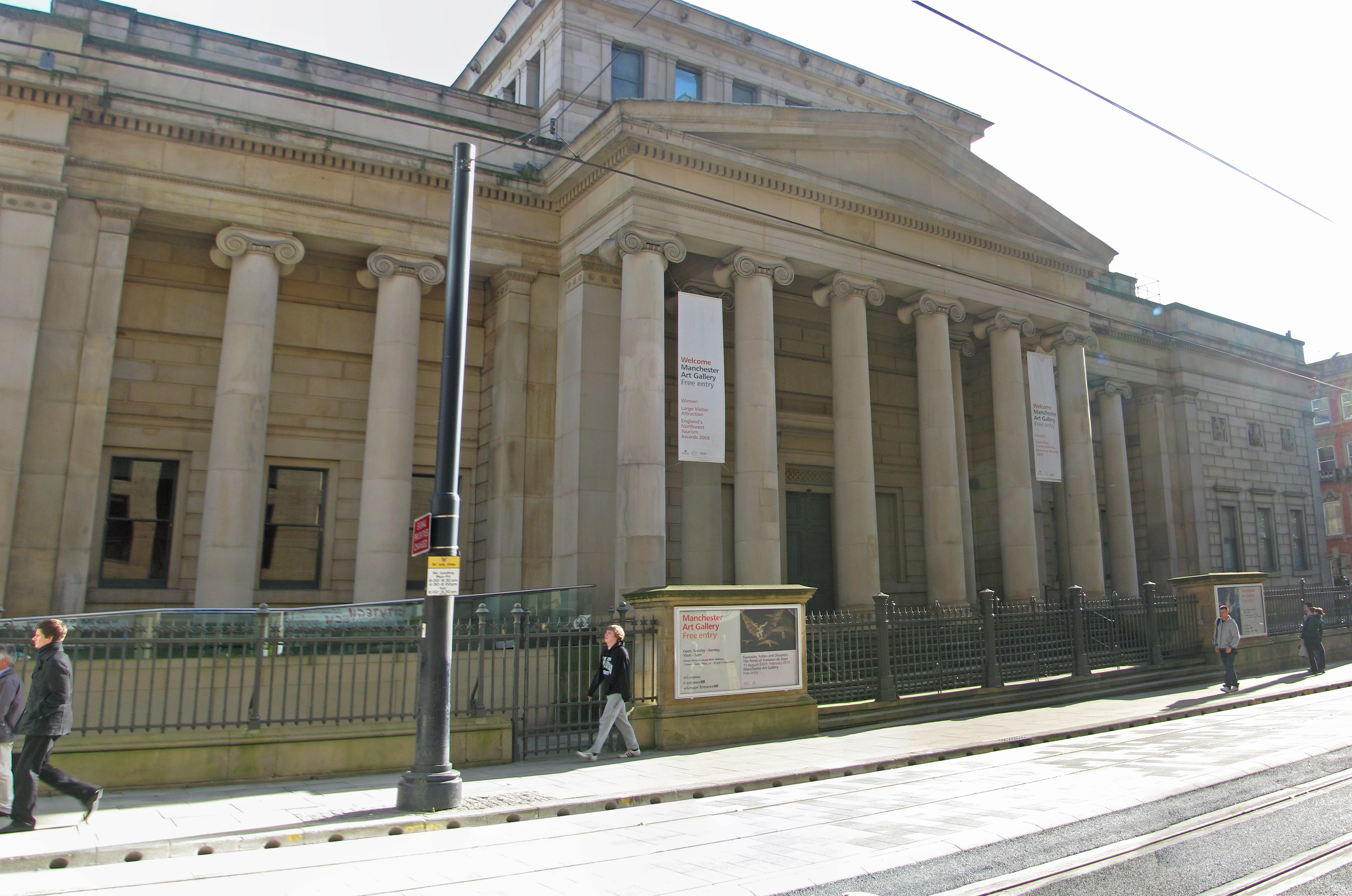
Charles Barry's Royal Manchester Institution is now Manchester Art Gallery

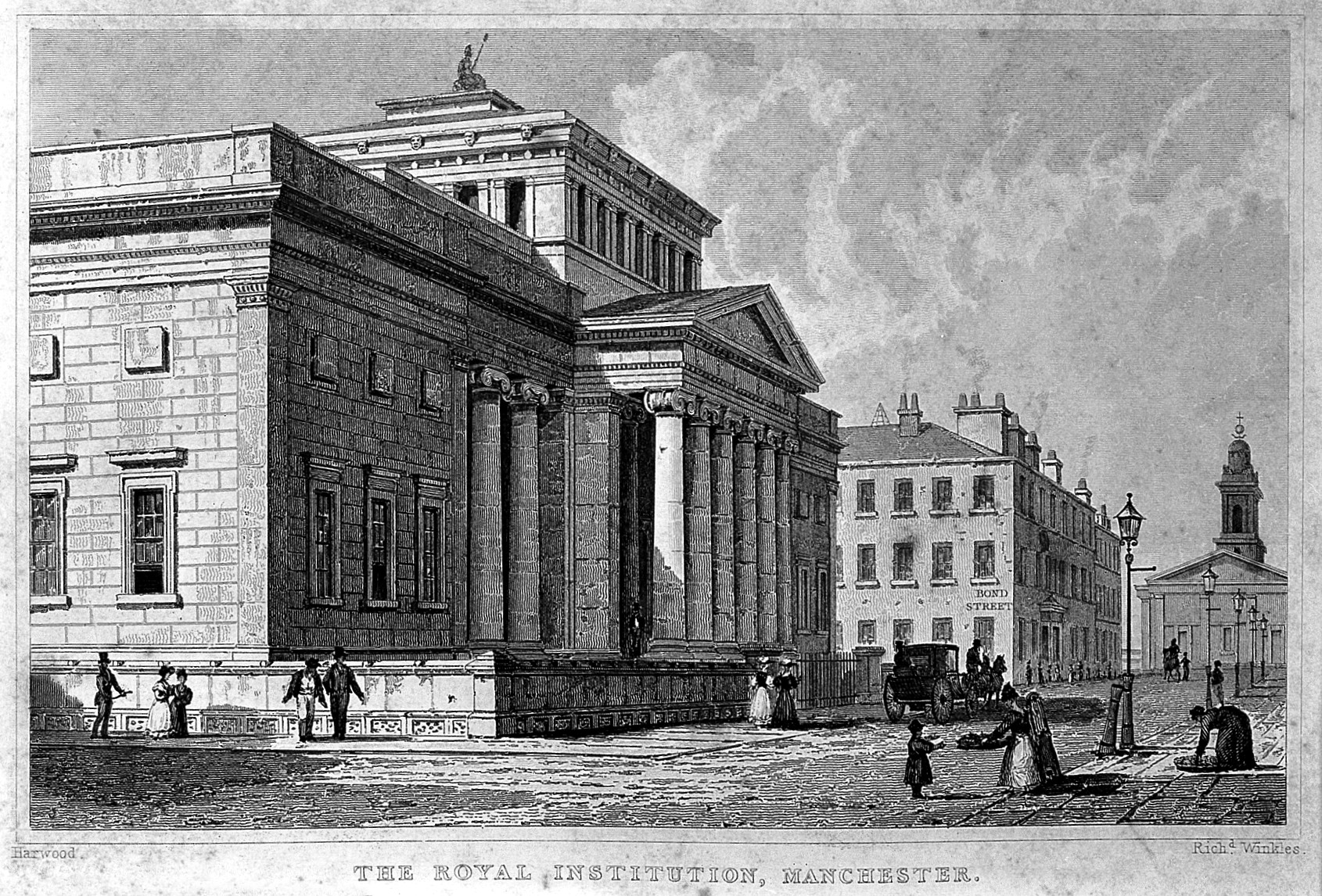
Print of 1831

The Royal Manchester Institution (RMI) was an English learned society founded on 1 October 1823 at a public meeting held in the Exchange Room by Manchester merchants, local artists and others keen to dispel the image of Manchester as a city lacking in culture and taste.

The Institution was housed in a building in Mosley Street designed by Charles Barry in 1824. Construction of the building began in 1825, and was completed in 1835, at a cost of £30,000. A Grade I listed building, it is his only public building in the Greek neo-classical style. The Institution held regular art exhibitions, collected works of fine art and promoted the arts generally from the 1820s until 1882, when the building and its collections were transferred under Act of Parliament to Manchester Corporation, becoming Manchester Art Gallery.

In the basement a laboratory was installed by Lyon Playfair who worked there briefly as Professor of Chemistry after he left Thomson's of Clitheroe. He was succeeded by Frederick Crace Calvert who made phenol which was used by Joseph Lister as an antiseptic.

The first school of design in Manchester was accommodated in the building from 1838. The school was renamed the school of art in 1853 which became a sectional department of the Royal Manchester Institution. In 1892 it became the Municipal School of Art. In the 1880s it moved to premises in Cavendish Street, Chorlton on Medlock, which it still occupies as part of the Manchester Metropolitan University. The latter building was designed by G. T. Redmayne (1880–81) and is now known as the Grosvenor Building of the Metropolitan University.

The Manchester School of Art undertook teaching at various levels and became a central institution serving a wide area around Manchester. Two branches of activity were undertaken, the training of creative artists, and the training of trade craftsmen. The resources of the school included well-equipped studios and workrooms, a museum of applied art and a library. The school conferred the diploma of associateship on successful students, and also prepared students for diplomas conferred by other bodies including the Board of Education's scheme for training art teachers.

== Notable Staff ==
- Lyon Playfair
- Frederick Crace Calvert

== Officers ==
Among the vice-presidents of the Institution was Joseph Jordan, a pioneer in provincial medical education, who served in that role in 1857.

== See also ==
- List of societies for education in Manchester
