= Medical Ethics (book) =

First book focused on public health and medical ethics

Medical Ethics; or, a Code of Institutes and Precepts, Adapted to the Professional Conduct of Physicians and Surgeons
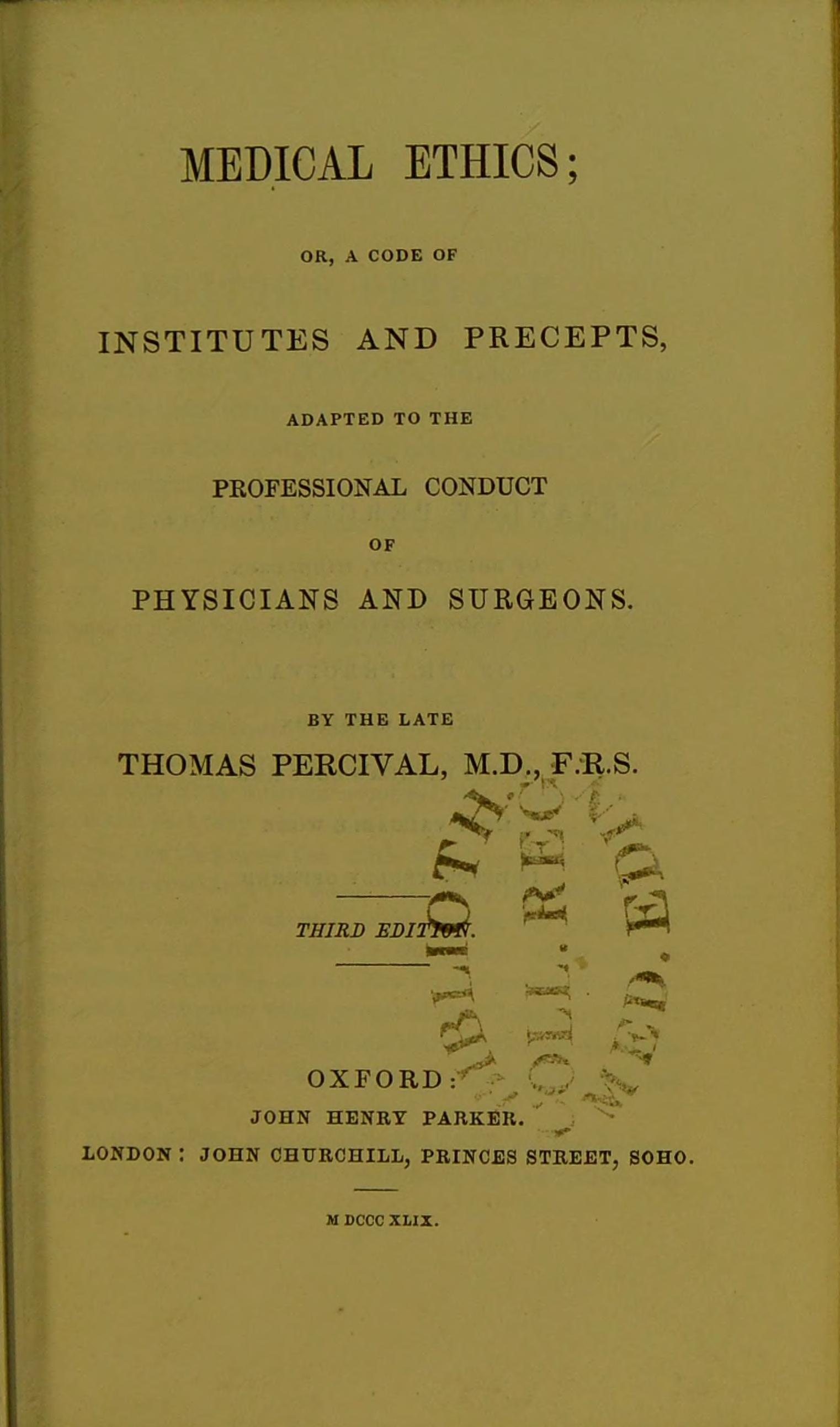
- Title page for Medical Ethics; or, a Code of Institutes and Precepts, Adapted to the Professional Conduct of Physicians and Surgeons (1849 printing)
- Author: Thomas Percival
- Language: English
- Subject: Public health Medical ethics
- Published: 1803
- Publisher: Cambridge University Press
- Publication place: England
- Media type: Print

Medical Ethics; or, a Code of Institutes and Precepts, Adapted to the Professional Conduct of Physicians and Surgeons is a medical book focused on public health and medical ethics. It was written by English physician Thomas Percival and published in 1803. The book is widely regarded as the first on public health and ethics in medicine. Prior to 1803 medical ethics was more focused on medical etiquette. Medical Ethics was the first book to coin the term "medical ethics". The book "adopts a holistic approach to patient care" and set the standard for many future textbooks.
