= Thomas Percival =

English physician and ethicist (1740–1804)

Thomas Percival FRS FRSE FSA
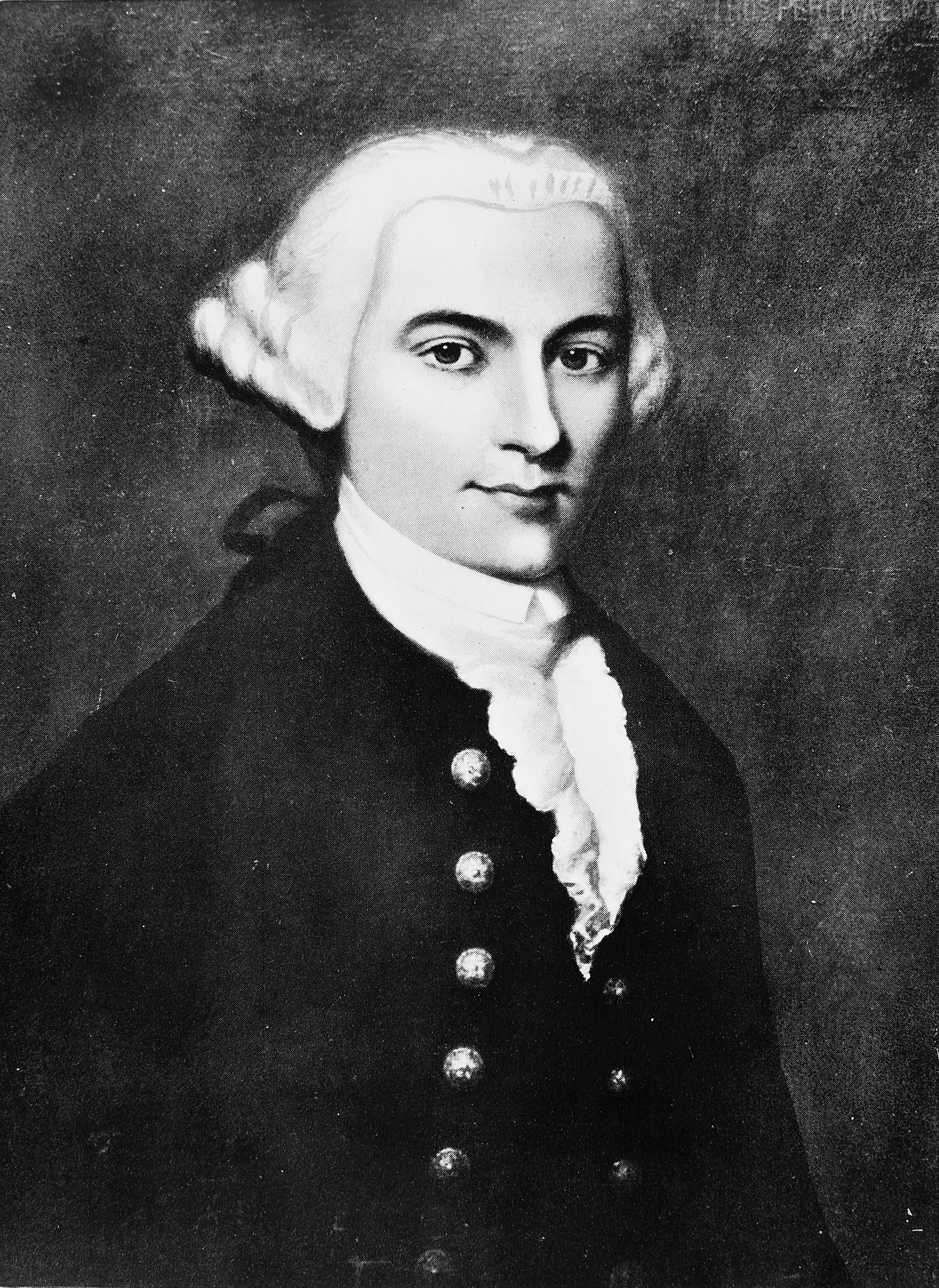
- Born: 29 September 1740; Warrington, Lancashire, England
- Died: 30 August 1804 (aged 63); Manchester, Lancashire, England
- Education: Warrington Academy; University of Edinburgh; Leyden University
- Occupations: Physician; Author
- Spouse: Elizabeth Basnett

Thomas Percival (29 September 1740 – 30 August 1804) was an English physician, health reformer, ethicist and author who wrote an early code of medical ethics. He drew up a pamphlet with the code in 1794 and wrote an expanded version in 1803, Medical Ethics; or, a Code of Institutes and Precepts, Adapted to the Professional Conduct of Physicians and Surgeons in which he coined the expression "medical ethics". He was a founding subscriber of the Portico Library in Manchester and a pioneering campaigner for public health measures and factory regulation in the city.

== Background ==
He was born in Warrington, Lancashire, on 29 September 1740, the son of Joseph Percival and his wife, Margaret Orred. He lost both his parents when he was three years old, so his older sister was responsible for his early education. Once he was old enough, he was placed in a private academy in his home town. He also spent time at the Boteler Grammar School, Warrington. He was enrolled as one of the first students at Warrington Academy in 1756. He achieved a good reputation in classical and theological studies.

== Career ==
In 1761 he went to study Medicine at Edinburgh University. He did further postgraduate study at Leyden University in Holland and obtained his doctorate (MD) in 1765.

He became a fellow to the Royal Society in the same year, through a recommendation by his friend and patron Lord Willoughby de Parham. In 1771 he hosted Benjamin Franklin in Manchester, who went on to be a guest of Rev. John Michell at Thornhill Rectory; other guests being Joseph Priestley and Messrs. Smeaton, Pringle and Ingenhousz. He was elected a Foreign Honorary Member of the American Academy of Arts and Sciences in 1789.

After working as a physician in Warrington from 1765, Percival took a similar post in Manchester from 1767. He was elected to the American Philosophical Society in 1786 and to the Royal Society of Edinburgh in 1787. He was a prominent member of the Manchester Literary and Philosophical Society, of which he was a founder member and served as president during 1782-1804.

Percival holds an important place in the history of epidemiology for his analysis of the Bills of Mortality from 1772–6, and for his code of medical ethics. The latter was initially circulated privately as a book on jurisprudence in 1794 and as a result of solicited comments from colleagues then published in an expanded form with a change in title to Medical ethics in 1803. Percival had been asked by the Manchester Royal Infirmary to help with an internal dispute and became particularly concerned with the divisions that had arisen among the different branches of the profession – the physicians, surgeons, and apothecaries with their different backgrounds of training (university, hospital, and apprenticeship respectively). But he did not merely concern himself with intraprofessional relationships: he also laid down a code for conduct towards patients, whether rich or poor, and his ideas were rapidly taken up by the USA, Australia, and Canada — in fact, the ethical code introduced by the newly formed American Medical Association in 1847 used several passages taken directly from his book.

He died in Manchester on 30 August 1804 and is buried at Warrington Church.

== Occupational health and medical ethics ==
Percival is also known for his early work in Occupational health. He led a group of doctors to supervise textile mills, their report influenced Robert Peel's to introduce the Health and Morals of Apprentices Act 1802. The legislation stipulated that children could work only 12 hours per day, walls had to be washed, and visitors had to be admitted to factories so that they could make health-related suggestions.

Percival's Medical Ethics served as a key source for the American Medical Association (AMA) code, adopted in 1847. Though hyperbolic in its recognition of Percival, the AMA itself states:

The most significant contribution to Western medical ethical history subsequent to Hippocrates was made by Thomas Percival, an English physician, philosopher, and writer. In 1803, he published his Code of Medical Ethics. His personality, his interest in sociological matters, and his close association with the Manchester Infirmary led to the preparation of a scheme of professional conduct relative to hospitals and other charities from which he drafted the code that bears his name.

As one expert writes, "The Percivalian code asserted the moral authority and independence of physicians in service to others, affirmed the profession's responsibility to care for the sick, and emphasized individual honor." Percival was a devout Christian.

== Family ==
Percival was married to Elizabeth Basnett.

== Selected works ==
- Essays medical and experimental: on the following subjects, viz. I. The empiric. II. The dogmatic. Or, arguments for and against the use of theory and reasoning in physick. III. Experiments and observations on astringents and bitters IV. On the uses and operation of blisters. V. On the resemblance between chyle and milk. London: for Joseph Johnson and B. Davenport, 1767 (followed by later editions)
- Essays medical and experimental [Vol. II]: on the following subjects: 1. On the Columbo root. 2. On the orchis root. 3. On the waters of Buxton and Matlock ... 4. On the medicinal uses of fixed air. 5. On the antiseptic and sweetening powers ... of factitious air. 6. On the noxious vapours of charcoal. 7. On the atrabilis. 8. On sea salt. 9. On coffee. To which are added, select histories of diseases ... London: for Joseph Johnson, 1773
- Essays, medical philosophical and experimental; By Thomas Percival, M.D. F.R.S. and A.S. Lond. F.R.S. and R.M.S. Edinb. Member of the Royal Society of Medicine at Paris; of the Royal Society of Agriculture at Lyons; and of the American Philosophy Soc. at Philadelphia, &c. &c. The fourth edition, revised and enlarged. 2 vols. Warrington: printed by W. Eyres, for J. Johnson, London, 1788–89
- Medical ethics; or a Code of institutes and precepts, adapted to the professional interests of physicians and surgeons. Manchester: S. Russell, 1803 (followed by later editions)

Professional and academic associations
Preceded by James Massey	President of the Manchester Literary and Philosophical Society; 1782–86, 1789–1804	Succeeded by George Walker
