= Martineau =

Martineau is a surname. It is of French origin and may refer to:

- Alice Martineau (1972–2003), English pop singer and songwriter
- Alfred Albert Martineau (1859–1945), French Governor General
- Alfred Martineau (cricketer) (1868–1940), English cricketer
- André Martineau (1930–1972), French mathematician
- Barrett Martineau (born 1991), Canadian skeleton racer
- Don Martineau (1952–2006), American ice hockey player
- Earl Martineau (1896–1966), American football player and coach
- Éric Martineau (born 1978), French politician
- Eugène Martineau (politician) (1837–1880), Ottawa mayor
- Eugène Martineau (athlete) (born 1980), Dutch decathlete
- France Martineau, Canadian linguist and professor
- François Martineau (1844–1911), Canadian politician
- G. D. Martineau (1897–1976), English cricket writer
- George Martineau (1905–1969), Dean of Edinburgh
- Gérald Martineau (1902–1968), Canadian politician
- Géraldine Martineau (born 1985), French actress
- Gilbert Martineau (1962), French Canadian - Customer Service Resolution Specialist
- Gilbert Martineau (1918–1995), French author and Honorary Consul on St Helena
- Gord Martineau (born 1948), Canadian television journalist
- Harriet Martineau (1802–1876), British social theorist and Whig writer, often cited as the first female sociologist.
- Henry Martineau (1904–1972), British bobsledder
- Herbert Martineau (1914–1994), British racewalker
- Horace Martineau (1874–1916), South African recipient of the Victoria Cross
- Hubert Martineau (1891–1976), English patron of cricket
- Jacques Martineau (born 1963), French film director
- Jane Martineau, British art historian
- Jean Martineau (lawyer) (1895–1985), Canadian lawyer and President of the Canada Council for the Arts
- Jean Martineau (ice hockey) (born 1961), Canadian ice hockey executive
- Jérôme Martineau (1750–1809), Canadian businessman and politician
- Jesse Martineau, American politician
- John Ellis Martineau (1873–1937), Governor of Arkansas, U.S. District Judge for the Eastern District of Arkansas
- Lionel Martineau (1867–1906), English cricketer
- Luc Martineau, Canadian judge
- Malcolm Martineau (born 1960), Scottish pianist
- Paul Martineau (1921–2010), Canadian politician, lawyer and crown attorney
- Sir Philip Martineau (1862–1944), English cricketer and lawyer
- Pierre Raymond Martineau (born 1935), Canadian businessman and politician
- Pierre-Raymond-Léonard Martineau (1857–1903), Canadian lawyer and politician
- Richard Martineau (born 1961), Canadian journalist
- Robert Martineau (1913–1999), Bishop of Huntingdon and Blackburn
- Robert Braithwaite Martineau (1826–1869), English painter
- Shereen Martineau, Irish actress
- Sydney Martineau (1863–1945), British fencer
- Violet Martineau (1865 – 1948), English writer, editor, and biographer.
- Martineau family, a dynasty originating in Norwich, England, including prominent politicians and Unitarians
  - Edith Martineau (1842–1909), British watercolour painter
  - Harriet Martineau (1802–1876), writer and pioneer sociologist
  - James Martineau (1805–1900), philosopher
  - John Martineau (1789–1832), English sugar refiner and engineer
  - Peter Finch Martineau (1755–1847), English businessman and community benefactor

== See also ==
- R. v. Martineau (1990), leading Supreme Court of Canada case on the mens rea requirement for murder
- Martineau Galleries, a proposed mixed-use development for Birmingham, England
- Martineau Gardens, a community garden in Birmingham, England
- Martineau Place, a shopping centre in Birmingham, England
