= Alice Vaughan-Williams Martineau =

Alice Vaughan-Williams Martineau (1862 – 7 February 1956) was an English garden designer, writer, and socialite who lectured prominently in the United States. Alice wrote several books on gardening and was considered an expert on hot climate plants, like those of the Mediterranean.

== Biography ==
Alice was born in 1862 in St Asaph, Denbighshire, Wales to Robert Vaughan-Williams, a judge, and Sarah Jane Reid. She married Philip Martineau of the wealthy Martineau family in 1888. They had three sons, one of whom was Hubert Martineau.

== Writer ==
Alice Vaughan-Williams Martineau wrote several books, including on the subjects of cooking, fox hunting, gardening, and history. Two of her recipe books, Cantaloup to Cabbage and Caviare to Candy, were popular among English social circles. Her first book, The Herbaceous Garden published in 1913, was by far her most popular and led to multiple lecture tours throughout the United States. The famous gardener William Robinson wrote the introduction to Alice's first book on gardening. The writer Edith Wharton, a personal friend of Alice's, wrote the introduction to 1924's Gardening in Sunny Lands: The Riviera, California, Australia.

== Gardener ==
Wellsbridge Cottage in 1925, with a garden designed by Alice Vaughan-Williams Martineau.

Although she did not have to work and considered herself an amateur, Alice designed or consulted on several significant gardens throughout her lifetime. During the early 1920s, he consulted for King Ferdinand and Queen Marie on improving the Romanian royal gardens in Bucharest and advised the king and queen of Greece on the layout of gardens in Athens. She redesigned the gardens at Hurst Lodge, a mansion originally dating from 1580 near Twyford, Berkshire, England. In 1913–1914, she designed two private gardens in Massachusetts in Chestnut Hill and Brookline. She also designed the gardens of Wellsbridge Cottage, a summer home owned by the Martineau family near Ascot, England. In 1913 and 1922, she toured the United States giving lectures on the topic of gardening. She met many notable American socialites and gardeners through these speaking engagements. Alice co-founded the International Garden Club, an organization located at the Bartow-Pell Mansion that existed from 1914-1920s modeled on the Royal Horticultural Society, with Zelia Hoffman.

== Works ==
- The Herbaceous Garden, 1913
- Gardening in Sunny Lands: The Riviera, California, Australia, 1924
- The Secrets of Many Gardens, 1924
- Romania and Her Rulers, 1927
- Cantaloup to Cabbage: How to Cook and Serve Vegetables, with Many New Dishes, 1929
- Reminiscences of Hunting and Horses, 1930
- Caviare to Candy: Recipes for Small Households from all Parts of the World, 1933
