= Gertrude Martineau =

- Born: 1837; Liverpool
- Died: 1 May 1924 (aged 86–87); London
- Occupations: Painter, woodcarver, teacher
- Employer: Bedford College, London
- Father: James Martineau
- Relatives: Edith Martineau (sister); Harriet Martineau (aunt)

Gertrude Martineau (1837 – 1 May 1924) was a British watercolour painter, woodcarver, and teacher. She was one of the earliest female professors at Bedford College for Women, where she directed the school of art.

== Life ==
Martineau was born in Liverpool, the daughter of Unitarian minister James Martineau. She was the sister of Edith Martineau.

Alongside Edith, her younger sister, Martineau was a member of a small group of female artists associated with the Pre-Raphaelites. She was a painter of animals, flowers and genre scenes.

From 1873 to 1884, Martineau conducted the Art School at Bedford College, London, one of the few women professors during the college's first forty years. Her time as director of the art school was a period of particular popularity with pupils.

Martineau spent much of her time in London, also visiting the family's home in Rothiemurchus, Scotland. She painted there, as well as teaching art and woodcarving.

In 1907, Martineau laid the foundation stone of the Martineau Memorial Hall in Norwich. In 1913, Martineau erected a monument at Rothiemurchus in commemoration of her father.

Gertrude Martineau died on 1 May 1924 at home in London. She left money to a variety of causes and organisations in her will, including Manchester College, The Martineau Memorial Hall and Sunday School in Norwich, the Sunday School Association, Luke's House (Home for the Dying), Rothiemurchus Carving, and the Mayhew Home for Lost Cats and Dogs.

In 1925, Violet Martineau published a memoir called Gertrude Martineau and Rothiemurchus.

== Bibliography ==
- Outline Lessons on Morals (1881)
- Home Counsels (1889)
- A Village Class for Drawing and Wood Carving: Hints to Teachers (1891)
- Life in Earnest: Talks to Children [Reprinted The Inquirer] (1910)
