= Alfred Martineau =

Alfred Martineau may refer to:

- Alfred Albert Martineau (1857–1941), Colonial administrator and governor in the French Colonial Empire
- Alfred Martineau (cricketer) (1868–1940), English cricketer
