= Noël Hache =

Noël Hache (1630-1675) was a French ébéniste. He moved to Toulouse in 1656. He designed cabinets, guéridons, picture frames, draughts boards, etc.
