= Jane Henrietta Adeane =

British writer and benefactor (1842–1926)

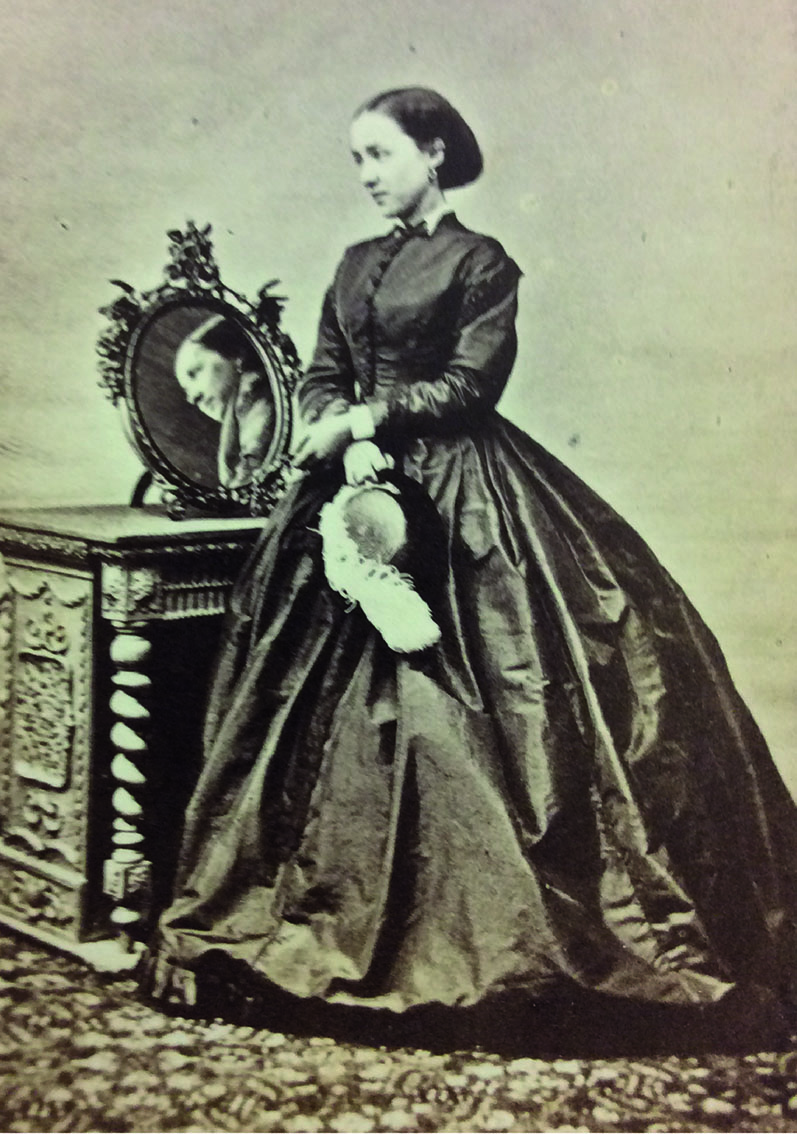
- Born: October 6, 1842; Babraham, Cambridgeshire
- Died: October 30, 1926 (aged 84)
- Occupations: Writer and benefactor
- Family: Stanley family

Jane Henrietta Adeane (6 October 1842 – 30 October 1926) was a British writer and benefactor. She was a leading figure in the town of Holyhead, Anglesey, during the late 19th and early 20th centuries.

== Life ==
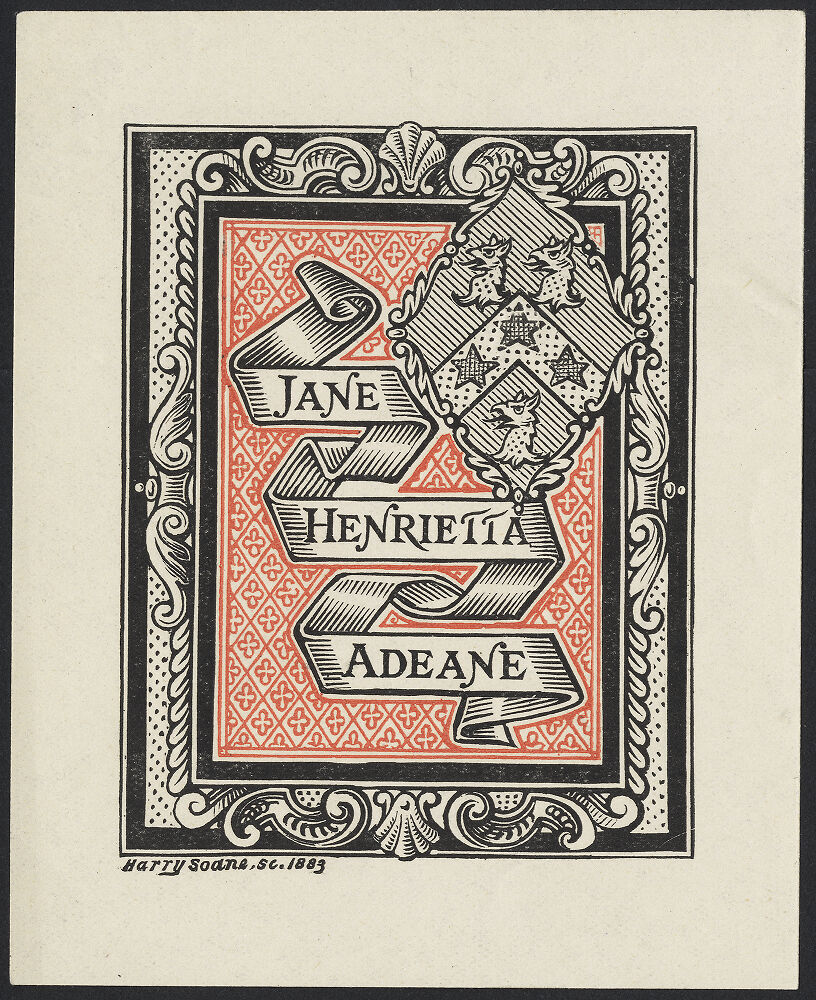
Bookplate of Henrietta Jane Adeane by Harry Soane

Jane Adeane was born in Babraham, Cambridgeshire in 1842, the seventh daughter and tenth child of Henry and Matilda Adeane. Adeane was part of the Penrhos family of Holyhead: the granddaughter of Sir John Thomas Stanley (1776–1850), 1st Baron Stanley of Penrhos, Holyhead, and sister of William Owen Stanley (1802–1884).

In 1860, on their brother's marriage, Jane and her sister Elizabeth left Babraham for Penrhos, Anglesey, where they lived with their uncle. Adeane lived at Plas Llanfawr, Holyhead. She tended the garden there with the help of a gardener, John Hughes, and under the advice of her friend Gertrude Jekyll.

Adeane commissioned Plas Alltran, Holyhead on Anglesey, as part of her redevelopment of the Blackbridge area of the town. It became the home for the town's first GP, Dr William Fox Russell, and had a number of subsequent uses. Around 1891, she also commissioned Tanalltran Cottages, now Grade II listed, like Plas Alltran. A report on the history of Plas Alltran, stated:

Miss Jane Adeane is now a largely forgotten figure in the history of Holyhead but during the late nineteenth and early twentieth centuries she was a leading figure in the town and gave freely of her time and money for the betterment of the town.

== Stanley Sailors’ Hospital ==
Adeane, a contemporary and associate of Florence Nightingale, was an administrator and benefactor of the Stanley Sailors’ Hospital. On the outbreak of the First World War, she became the Commandant of the Hospital on behalf of the Red Cross.

Between 1916 and 1919, 1,400 wounded sailors were admitted to the hospital. Adeane and the hospital nurses worked throughout the war and saved many lives. At the war's end, the hospital was still in operation.

In 1920, in recognition of her work, Adeane was made an Officer of the Order of the British Empire.

== Death and legacy ==
Jane Adeane died in 1926. A commemorative plaque was placed in St Cybi's Church, Anglesey, where a new gateway and gate funded by Adeane was built in 1927. The plaque reads:

Remember before God Jane Henrietta Adeane O.B.E. of Plas Llanfawr where she lived for forty three years and worked with untiring devotion for the welfare of the people of Holyhead. Born sixth of October 1843 [sic] and died the thirtieth of October 1926. The seventh daughter of Henry John Adeane M.P. of Babraham Cambridgeshire and of Matilda Abigail his wife, daughter of John First Lord Stanley of Alderley. She caused this chapel to be built and the monument herein erected to the memory of her Uncle William Owen Stanley.

Around 1934, Violet Isabel Martineau, her niece, wrote a biography of Adeane.

== Bibliography ==
- The Girlhood of Maria Josepha Holroyd (1896)
- The Early Married Life of Maria Josepha, Lady Stanley: With Extracts from Sir John Stanley's 'Praeterita' (1899)
- Before and after Waterloo; letters from Edward Stanley, sometime bishop of Norwich (1907)
