= Frank Schulman =

American writer (1927–2006)

Jacob Frank Schulman (1927–2006) was a U.S. Unitarian Universalist minister, theologian, and author of several books. He held numerous degrees, including a B.A. from the University of Oklahoma, an S.T.B. from Harvard Divinity School, a D.Phil., M.A., and Minister Emeritus Scholar from Oxford University, and an honorary Doctorate of Divinity from Meadville Lombard Theological School.

Schulman was the author of several theological and historical books, and specialized particularly in the study of 19th-century religious figures, especially Charles Wellbeloved, Ralph Waldo Emerson, and James Martineau. He was also a minister for most of his life, serving in Youngstown, Ohio, and at Emerson Church in Houston, Texas, for 25 years, in addition to many other churches, some in England. Schulman served as a teacher to ministry students at Manchester College at Oxford University from 1989 to 1996. In retirement he served as the first minister for a small congregation in Huntsville, Texas, which has become Thoreau Woods Unitarian-Universalist Church.

== Partial bibliography ==
- Unitarians Believe: An Introduction to Unitarianism (1960)
- Ralph Waldo Emerson: His Life, His Work, His Theology (1965)
- Emerson and the Ministry (Minns lectures) (1983)
- 'Blasphemous and Wicked': The Unitarian Struggle for Equality 1813-1844 (1997, Harris Manchester College, University of Oxford, Oxford)
- A Fine Victorian Gentleman: The Life and Times of Charles Wellbeloved (1999, Harris Manchester College, University of Oxford, Oxford)
- James Martineau: This Conscience-Intoxicated Unitarian (2002, Meadville Lombard Press, Chicago)
- This Day in Unitarian Universalist History: A Treasury of Anniversaries and Milestones from 600 Years of Religious Tradition (2004, Skinner House, Boston)
- A Manual of Worship: Insights From Over 50 Years as a Unitarian Universalist Minister (2006, Unitarian Universalist Association of Congregations, Boston)
