= Adventures in Preservation =

Non-profit architecture organization

- Founded: December 2001
- Type: Charitable trust
- Purpose: architectural conservation, heritage tourism, Economic Development, cultural sustainability
- Location: Boulder, Colorado
- Region served: Worldwide
- Website: adventuresinpreservation.org
- Formerly called: Heritage Conservation Network

Adventures in Preservation, formerly named Heritage Conservation Network, is a non-profit organization dedicated to safeguarding the world's architectural heritage. Its programs give volunteers the opportunity to be involved in preservation in a variety of hands-on ways.

== Overview ==
Adventures in Preservation (AiP) is a non-profit organization revolving around "Heritage Travel with Purpose". AiP connects people and preservation through hands-on programs that safeguard cultural heritage and foster community sustainability. AiP travelers have the opportunity to travel, experience their destination, and learn hands-on skills from experts while assisting communities.

AiP organizes a series of hands-on building conservation workshops and volunteer vacations. Working in locations around the world, participants support community-based preservation projects, such as restoring houses to create affordable housing. The workshops are opportunities to give back while learning about preservation in general, as well as specific building conservation techniques.

Each workshop is led by a technical expert, who teaches and guides volunteers as they work. Participation is open to all, from teens to active retirees. Since its founding in 2001, Adventures in Preservation has worked in a half-dozen countries, including Albania, Slovenia, Mexico, Italy, Ghana, and the United States. Requests for assistance come directly from people involved at the grass-roots level, and projects are put onto a wait list.

== Global impact and recognition ==
Numerous examples have shown that AiP's volunteer efforts are a major catalyst for conservation. AiP volunteers have played a role in restoration projects at the Francis Mill in Waynesville, North Carolina; the Weisel Bridge, Quakertown, Pennsylvania; Manor House in Oplotnica, Slovenia; the gardens of the Bartow-Pell Mansion Museum, The Bronx, New York; and adobe residences in Mesilla, New Mexico.

They have been involved in restoration efforts at the Jean (Jacob) Hasbrouck House, New Paltz, New York; the Monastery of San Giovanni Battista, Serravalle, Vittorio Veneto, Italy; a shotgun house in Cairo, Illinois; the Chief's House in Ablekuma, Ghana; and missions in Chihuahua, Mexico. AiP also organized crews of volunteers in New Orleans, Louisiana, and Bay St. Louis, Mississippi, to help clean up in the aftermath of Hurricane Katrina.

AiP volunteers restore more than buildings; they help restore people's lives, communities, and pride in their heritage. The workshops also contribute to heritage tourism, economic development, and job training initiatives.

The organization and its volunteers have received awards for their efforts at Bartow-Pell Mansion Museum and their emergency stabilization work at the James Brown House and Farm Ooltehwah, Tennessee.

== Workshops ==
AiP have provided an educational experience, with hands-on training and excursions designed to highlight the essence of each country's culture. AiP offers six to eight workshops each year. As with most volunteer travel programs, there is a fee for participating. This fee covers lodging, most meals, insurance, instructions, and a contribution towards the cost of conservation work and building materials.

"Jammers" is a term for the people who travel with AiP to explore and help restore the world's cultural heritage, because they are more than volunteers or participants. It was thought that the term "jammers" originated from an early misunderstanding that Adventures in Preservation worked with jam, jelly, and other fruit preserves; an interesting possibility, but not so. It refers to the way a group of musicians, or other groups, come together to "jam" and create something new.
