= Charles-Honoré Lannuier =

French cabinetmaker (1779–1819)

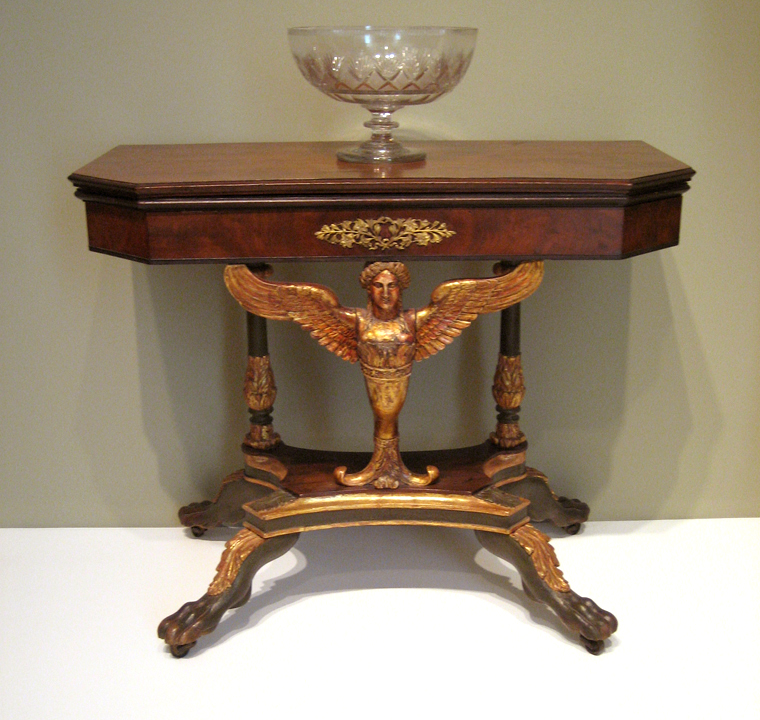
Game table, c. 1815, mahogany, gesso, gilding, and ormolu mounts

Charles-Honoré Lannuier, French cabinetmaker (1779–1819), lived and worked in New York City. In Lannuier's time, the style of his furniture was described as "French Antique." Today, his work is classified primarily as Federal furniture, Neoclassical, or American Empire.

== Early life and influences ==
Charles-Honoré Lannuier was born outside of Paris in Chantilly, France, on June 27, 1779, son to Michel-Cyrille Lannuier, an innkeeper, and his wife, Marie-Geneviève Malice. From childhood, Lannuier was influenced by his older brother, Nicolas-Louis-Cyrille Lannuier, and an uncle, Jean-Baptiste Cochois, both successful cabinetmakers selling furniture in pre-Revolutionary Paris. Both relatives contributed to Lannuier's training as an ébéniste (furniture maker). The social unrest and disruption of the economy by the French Revolution caused Lannuier to emigrate to the young American Republic in 1803. Though the French Revolution brought the disbandment of the furniture guilds, and the associated fashionable practice of labeling pieces with a maker's label, Lannuier continued that tradition in the U.S. despite its lack of guilds.

== Materials and decorative motifs ==
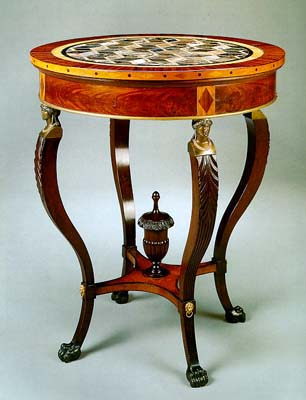
Center table guéridon, c. 1810, mahogany, satinwood, rosewood, and possibly sycamore veneers, gilded brass, and marble. Located in the Red Room of the White House.

In Paris, Lannuier worked primarily in mahogany, with limited amounts of satinwood and rosewood veneer inlays. Early pieces show the influence of late Louis XVI-style furniture. After moving to the United States, Lannuier benefitted from the more stable economy and access to exotic hardwoods, which allowed him to work on a larger scale using solid pieces of precious wood.

Lannuier's furniture is characterized by its use of architectural motifs–-columns, brackets, pediments, and pilasters; Greek and Roman motifs including anthemions, lyres, caryatids, dolphins, laurel wreaths, and winged figures. Federal motifs associated with the early Republic include eagles and five- or six-pointed stars. Large figures were carved and gilded, while smaller decorative mounts were cast in bronze and gilded.

== Range of furniture ==
Lannuier's earlier work included sideboards, commodes, worktables, dining tables and chairs, and game tables. One set of his early chairs was purchased by James Bosley, a Merchant from Baltimore, Maryland.

This particular set of twelve (12) Lannuier chairs (referred to as the "James Bosley Set") consisting of 2 Arm chairs and 10 side chairs in the Neoclassical French style was purchased for Bosley's Music room in Baltimore, Maryland. According to Mr. Peter Kenny's Book on Lannuier for the NY Met (pages 133–137) it is believed that James Bosley acquired the set of chairs from Lannuier's client, A.S. Bulloch in Savannah, Georgia. Archibald Stobo Bullock and his Wife, Sara Glen built the 'Bulloch-Habersham' house at 229 Barnard Street, Orleans Square in Savannah, Georgia, and filled the new house with a large quantity of furniture that had been shipped to Bulloch from Charles-Honore'Lannuier shortly before his death. Due to the Great Savannah Fire of 1820, Bulloch was forced to sell his possessions and eventually his house. James Bosley purchased the set which he used to furnish the music room in his new townhouse on Calvert Street in Baltimore.

The James Bosley set was passed down to his wife, Elizabeth Nicholson (Noel) Bosley, who, dying without issue, passed the set to her sister, Margaret Esther (Noel) Wyat, who left the set to her only child, Architect James Bosley Noel Wyatt. Mr. Wyatt left most of the chairs and other Lannuier pieces to the Maryland Historical Society in Baltimore. However, one chair from this set resides at the NY Met and two remain with family members. Two side chairs from the Bosley set remain unaccounted for.

Lannuier Side Chairs 8 and 9

Lannuier Side Chair (- 9 of set)

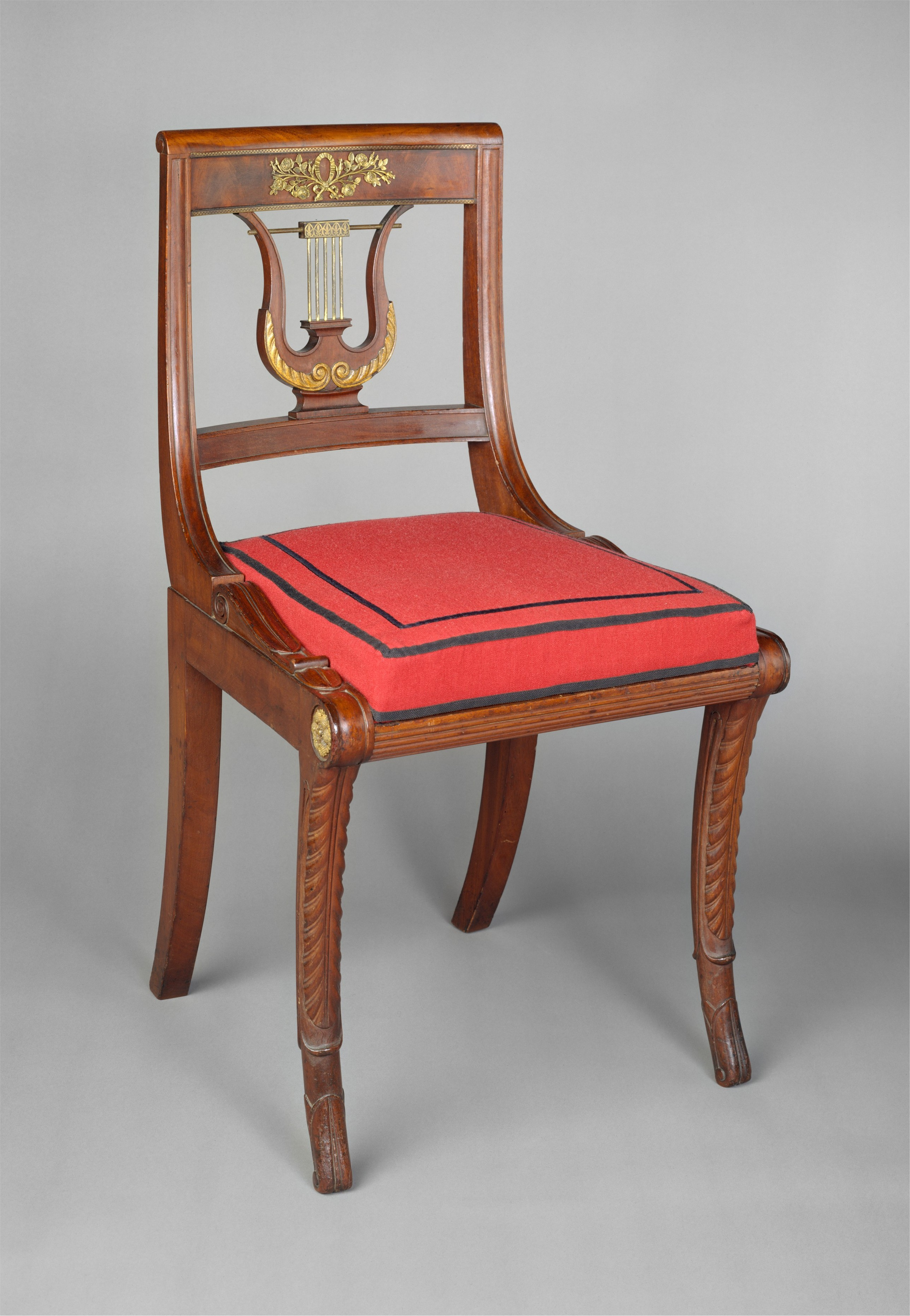
Side chair MET DT4498

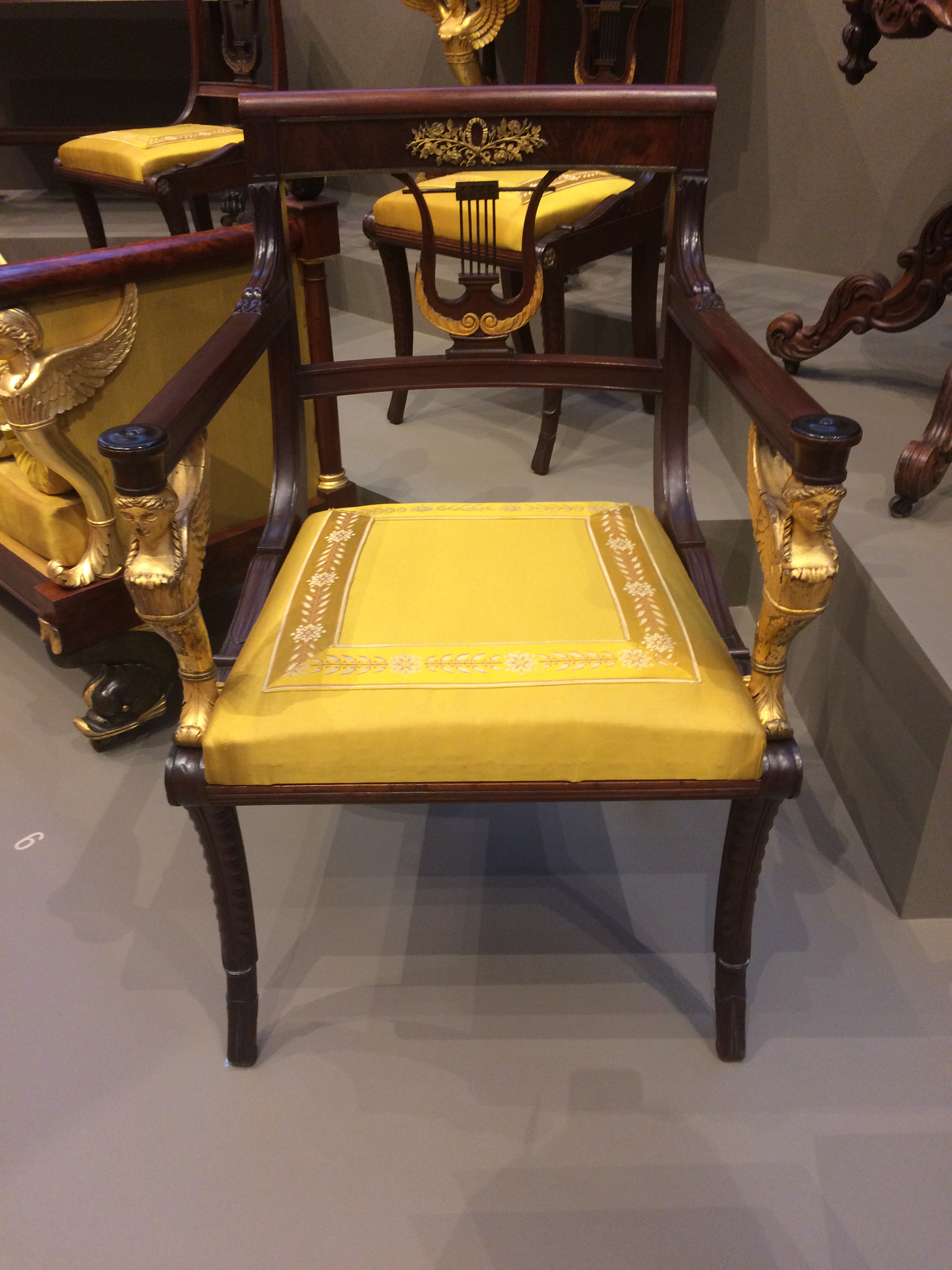
MDHS armchair xx.1.1e

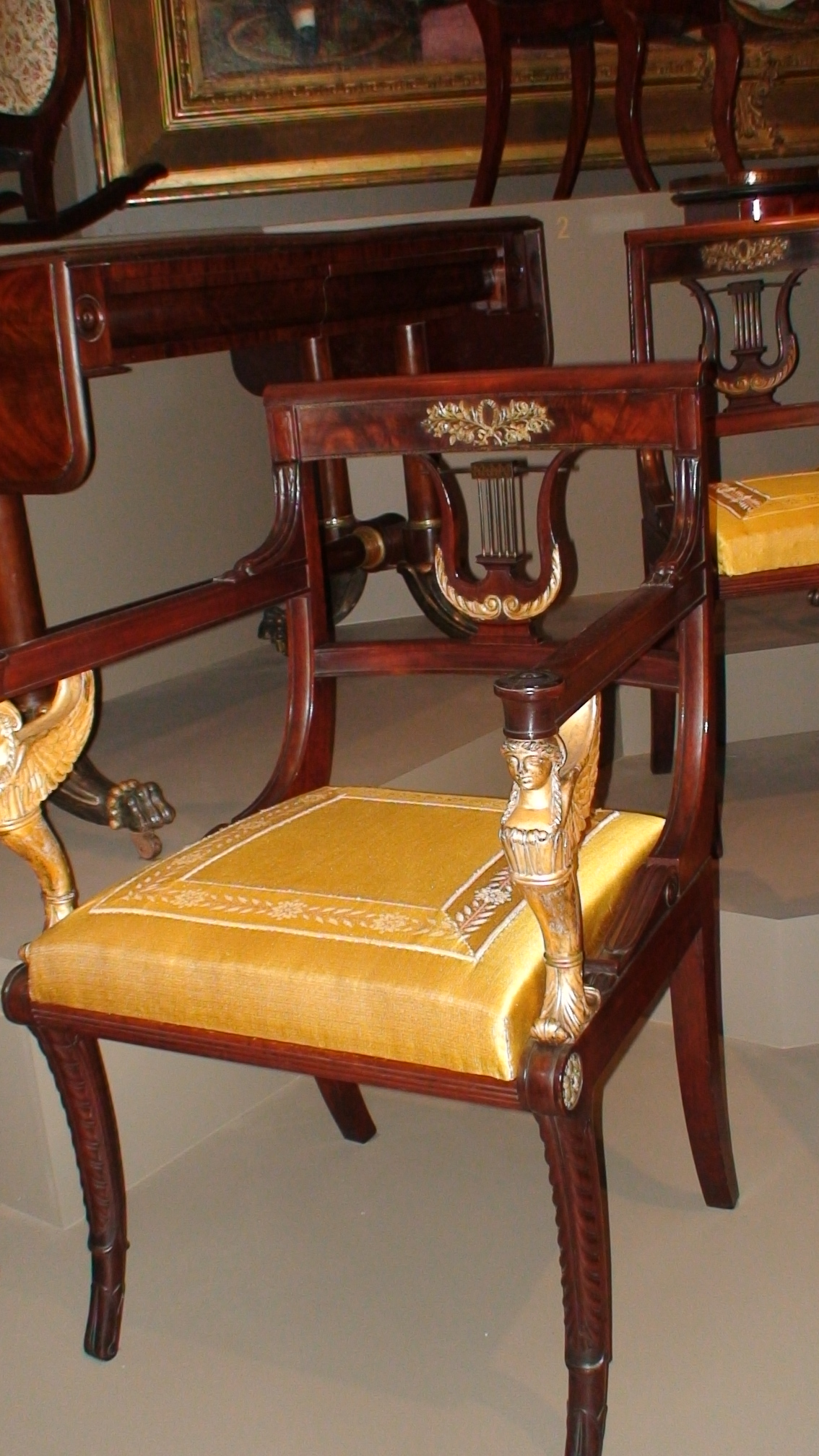
2009-05-23 Visit to Maryland Historical Society (Lannuier) (49)

Lannuier Side Chair 9 of James Bosley Set (Close up Lyre section)

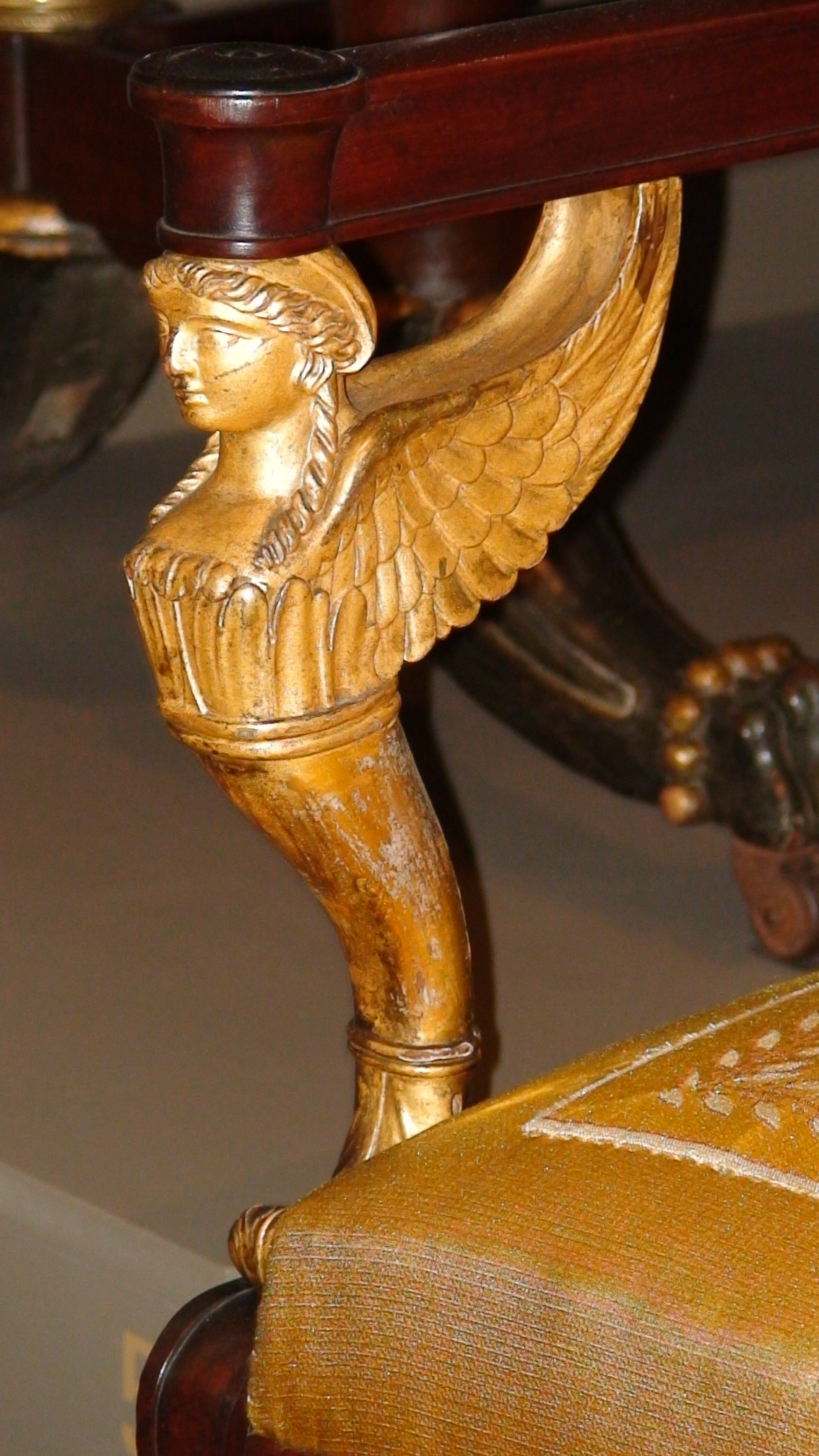
Lannuier Arm Chair Detail (James Bosley set) Maryland Historical Society

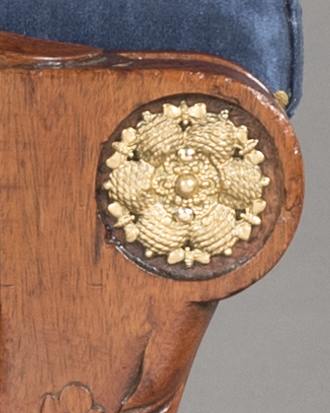
Lannuier Napoleonic Bee and Bee Hive Medallions (James Bosley Set). Top of the front of each chair leg. Gilded Brass.

As the Empire style became more entrenched and his success grew, Lannuier produced larger, more expensive pieces, including sofas, cylinder desks and bedsteads. While his pieces are considered within the Empire style, Lannuier's work is distinct for being more delicate and for recalling the refinement found in the Directoire style. Examples of Lannuier's furniture can be seen in the White House Red Room, the Albany Institute of History and Art, the Museum of Fine Arts, Boston, and New York's Metropolitan Museum of Art and Bartow-Pell Mansion.

The New York Metropolitan Museum of Art New York published a book titled: "Honoré Lannuier, Cabinetmaker from Paris (The Life and Work of a French Ebénisté in Federal New York)" by Peter M. Kenny, Frances F. Bretter and Ulrich Leben that outlines Lannuier's work.

== See also ==
- Duncan Phyfe, another esteemed cabinetmaker from the period.
