= Lionel Martineau =

English cricketer and solicitor

Personal information
- Full name: Lionel Martineau
- Born: 17 February 1867; Esher, Surrey, England
- Died: 17 November 1906 (aged 39); Esher, Surrey, England
- Batting: Right-handed
- Bowling: Right-arm slow
- Relatives: Alfred Martineau (brother); Hubert Martineau (cousin); Philip Martineau (cousin)

Domestic team information
- Years: Team
- 1887–1888: Cambridge University
- 1888: Marylebone Cricket Club

Career statistics
Competition	First-class
Matches	11
Runs scored	277
Batting average	19.78
100s/50s	1/–
Top score	109
Balls bowled	1,208
Wickets	17
Bowling average	31.88
5 wickets in innings	–
10 wickets in match	–
Best bowling	4/59
Catches/stumpings	9/–
- Source: Cricinfo, 29 April 2021

Lionel Martineau (19 February 1867 – 17 November 1906) was an English first-class cricketer and solicitor.

The son of Philip Meadows Martineau (1831 - 1911), he was born at Esher in February 1867. He was educated at Uppingham School, where he captained the school cricket team. From Uppingham he went up to Trinity College, Cambridge. While studying at Cambridge, he played first-class cricket for Cambridge University Cricket Club from 1887 to 1888, making ten appearances. An all-rounder he was described by Wisden as "a good batsman, having strong defence and possessing strokes all round the wicket, a useful slow bowler with a high delivery, and a fine field at mid-off". He scored 266 runs in his ten matches for Cambridge, averaging 20.46 and with a highest score of 109, which was his only first-class century and came against Sussex at Hove in 1887. With his right-arm slow bowling he took 17 wickets, with best figures of 4 for 59. His appearance in the 1887 University Match against Oxford gained him his cricket blue. He also made a single first-class appearance for the Marylebone Cricket Club against Cambridge University at Lord's in 1888.

After graduating from Cambridge, Martineau became a solicitor and was a partner at Martineau and Reid, based in London at Gray's Inn. Besides playing cricket, he was a tennis and hockey player and was the first president of Esher Tennis Club, with the tennis club based on the Littleworth Estate, which was owned by the Martineau family. Martineau died at Esher in November 1906. His brother, Alfred, played first-class cricket, as did his cousins Hubert and Philip Martineau.
