= James Martineau =

British religious philosopher (1805–1900)

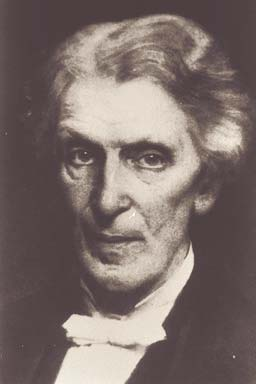
- Born: 21 April 1805; Norwich, England
- Died: 11 January 1900 (aged 94); London, England
- Relatives: Martineau family

Education
- Education: Manchester College, York

Philosophical work
- Region: British Unitarianism
- Institutions: Manchester New College
- Notable works: The Rationale of Religious Inquiry (1836); The Seat of Authority in Religion (1890)

Signature
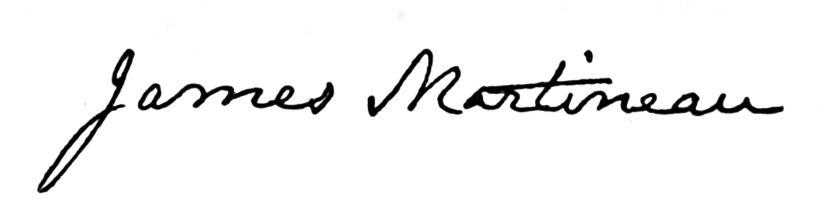

James Martineau (/ˈmɑːrtɪnoʊ/; 21 April 1805 – 11 January 1900) was a British religious philosopher influential in the history of Unitarianism. For 45 years he was Professor of Mental and Moral Philosophy and Political Economy in Manchester New College (now Harris Manchester College, of the University of Oxford), the principal training college for British Unitarianism. He also served as its Principal and President.

Many portraits of Martineau, including one painted by George Frederick Watts, are held at London's National Portrait Gallery. In 2014, the gallery revealed that its patron, Catherine, Princess of Wales, was related to Martineau. The Princess's great-great-grandfather, Francis Martineau Lupton, was Martineau's grandnephew. The gallery also holds written correspondence between Martineau and Poet Laureate, Alfred, Lord Tennyson - who records that he "regarded Martineau as the mastermind of all the remarkable company with whom he engaged". Martineau and Lord Tennyson were familiar with Queen Victoria's son, Prince Leopold, Duke of Albany and noted that Leopold, who had often "conversed with the eminent Dr. Martineau, was considered to be a young man of a very thoughtful mind, high aims, and quite remarkable acquirements". William Ewart Gladstone said to Frances Power Cobbe "Dr Martineau is beyond question the greatest of living thinkers".

Martineau was the brother of the social theorist and abolitionist Harriet Martineau. His children included the Pre-Raphaelite watercolourist Edith Martineau, and painter and woodcarver Gertrude Martineau.

== Early life ==
The seventh of eight children, James Martineau was born in Norwich, England, where his father Thomas (1764–1826) was a cloth manufacturer and merchant. His mother, Elizabeth Rankin, was the eldest daughter of a sugar refiner and grocer. The Martineau family were descended from Gaston Martineau, a Huguenot surgeon and refugee, who married Marie Pierre in 1693, and settled in Norwich. His son and grandson, respectively the great-grandfather and grandfather of James Martineau, were surgeons in the same city. Many of the family were active in Unitarian causes, so much so that a room in Essex Hall, the headquarters of British Unitarianism, was eventually named after them. Branches of the Martineau family in Norwich, Birmingham and London were socially and politically prominent Unitarians; other elite Unitarian families in Birmingham were the Kenricks, Nettlefolds and the Chamberlains, with much intermarriage between these families taking place. Essex Hall held a statue of Martineau. His niece, Frances Lupton, who was close to his sister Harriet, had worked to open up educational opportunities for women.

== Education and early years ==
James was educated at Norwich Grammar School where he was a school-fellow with George Borrow under Edward Valpy, as good a scholar as his better-known brother Richard, but proved too sensitive for school. He was sent to Bristol to the private academy of Dr. Lant Carpenter, under whom he studied for two years. On leaving he was apprenticed to a civil engineer at Derby, where he acquired "a store of exclusively scientific conceptions," but also began to look to religion for mental stimulation.

Martineau's conversion followed, and in 1822 he entered the dissenting academy Manchester College, then at York - his uncle Peter Finch Martineau was one of its vice-presidents. Here he "woke up to the interest of moral and metaphysical speculations." Of his teachers, one, the Rev. Charles Wellbeloved, was, Martineau said, "a master of the true Lardner type, candid and catholic, simple and thorough, humanly fond indeed of the counsels of peace, but piously serving every bidding of sacred truth." The other, the Rev. John Kenrick, he described as a man so learned as to be placed by Dean Stanley "in the same line with Blomfield and Thirlwall," and as "so far above the level of either vanity or dogmatism, that cynicism itself could not think of them in his presence." On leaving the college in 1827 Martineau returned to Bristol to teach in the school of Lant Carpenter; but in the following year, he was ordained for a Unitarian church in Dublin, whose senior minister was a relative of his.

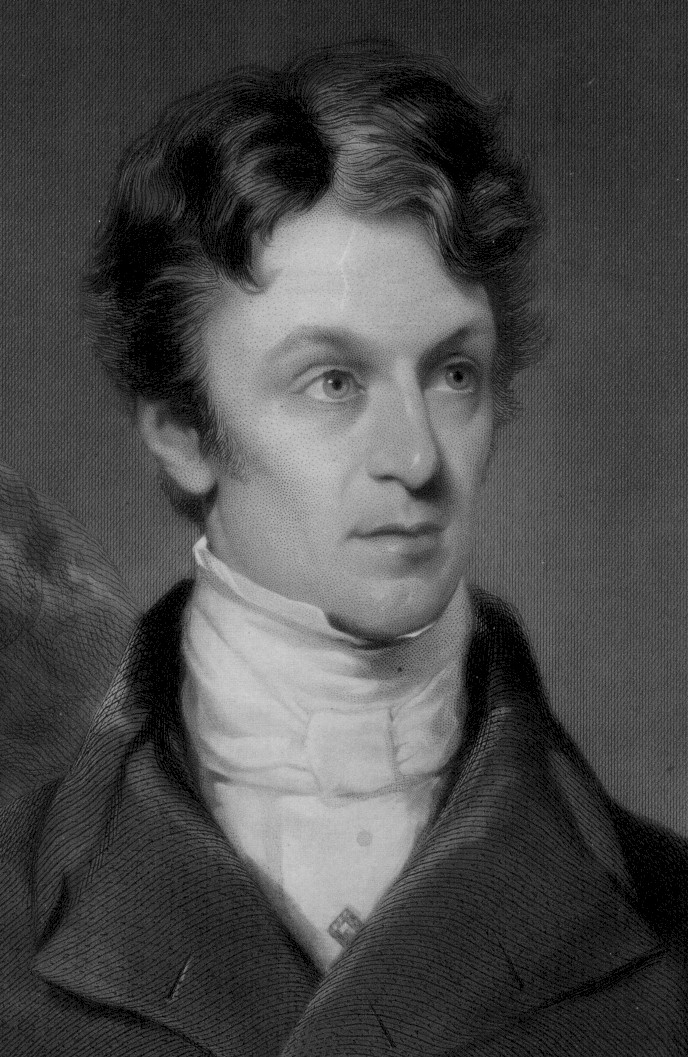
James Martineau at a younger age

Martineau's ministerial career was suddenly cut short in 1832 by difficulties growing out of the "regium donum", which had on the death of the senior minister fallen to him. He conceived it as "a religious monopoly" to which "the nation at large contributes," while "Presbyterians alone receive," and which placed him in "a relation to the state" so "seriously objectionable" as to be "impossible to hold." The invidious distinction it drew between Presbyterians on the one hand, and Catholics, members of the Religious Society of Friends (Quakers), other nonconformists, unbelievers, and Jews on the other, who were compelled to support a ministry they conscientiously disapproved, offended his conscience. His conscience did, however, allow him to attend both the Coronation of Queen Victoria in 1838 and her Golden Jubilee half a century later. A year prior to the coronation, at St James's Palace, Martineau had "kissed the hand" of the queen at the deputation of British Presbyterian ministers.

== Work and writings ==
From Dublin, he was called to Liverpool. He lodged in a house owned by Joseph Williamson. It was during his 25 years in Liverpool that he published his first work, Rationale of Religious Enquiry, which caught the attention of many religious and philosophical figures.

In 1840 Martineau was appointed Professor of Mental and Moral Philosophy and Political Economy in Manchester New College, the seminary in which he had been educated, and which had now moved from York back to Manchester. This position, and the principalship (1869–1885), he held for 45 years. In 1853 the college moved to London, and four years later he followed it there. In 1858 he combined this work with preaching at the pulpit of Little Portland Street Chapel in London, which for the first two years he shared with John James Tayler (who was also his colleague in the college), and then for twelve years as its only minister.

In 1866, the Chair of the Philosophy of Mind and Logic at University College, London, fell vacant when the liberal nonconformist Dr John Hoppus retired. Martineau became a candidate, and despite strong support from some quarters, potent opposition was organised by the anti-clerical George Grote, whose refusal to endorse Martineau resulted in the appointment of George Croom Robertson, then an untried man. Martineau, however, sidestepped Grote's opposition, much as Hoppus had learnt to do during his Professorship, and developed a cordial friendship with Robertson.

Martineau was elected a Foreign Honorary Member of the American Academy of Arts and Sciences in 1872. He was awarded LL.D. of Harvard in 1872, S.T.D. of Leiden in 1874, D.D. of Edinburgh in 1884, D.C.L. of Oxford in 1888 and D.Litt. of Dublin in 1891.

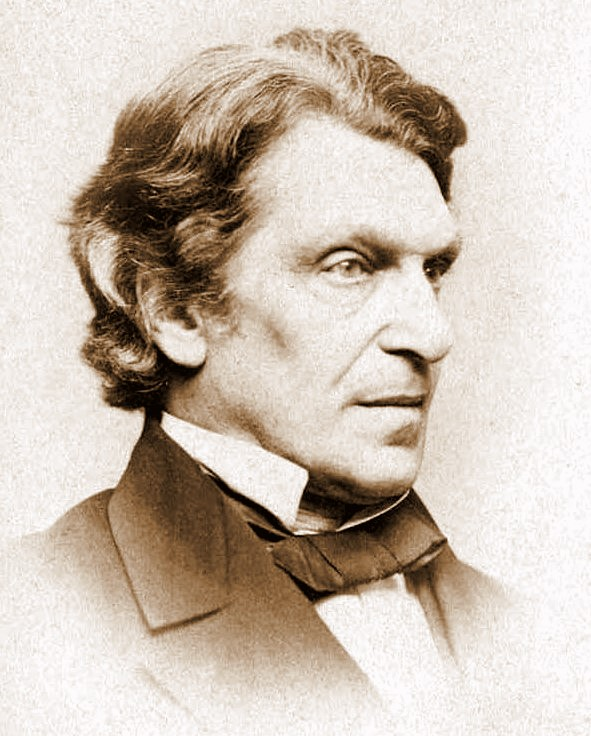
James Martineau by Elliott & Fry, circa 1860s

== Life and thought ==
Martineau described some of the changes he underwent; how he had "carried into logical and ethical problems the maxims and postulates of physical knowledge," and had moved within narrow lines "interpreting human phenomena by the analogy of external nature"; and how in a period of "second education" at Humboldt University in Berlin, with Friedrich Adolf Trendelenburg, he experienced "a new intellectual birth". It made him, however, no more of a theist than he had been before, and he developed Transcendentalist views, which became a significant current within Unitarianism.

=== Early years ===
In his early life he was a preacher. Although he did not believe in the Incarnation, he held deity to be manifest in humanity; man underwent an apotheosis, and all life was touched with the dignity and the grace which it owed to its source. His preaching led to works that built up his reputation:Endeavours after the Christian Life, 1st series, 1843; 2nd series, 1847; Hours of Thought, 1st series, 1876; 2nd series, 1879; the various hymn-books he issued at Dublin in 1831, at Liverpool in 1840, in London in 1873; and the Home Prayers in 1891.

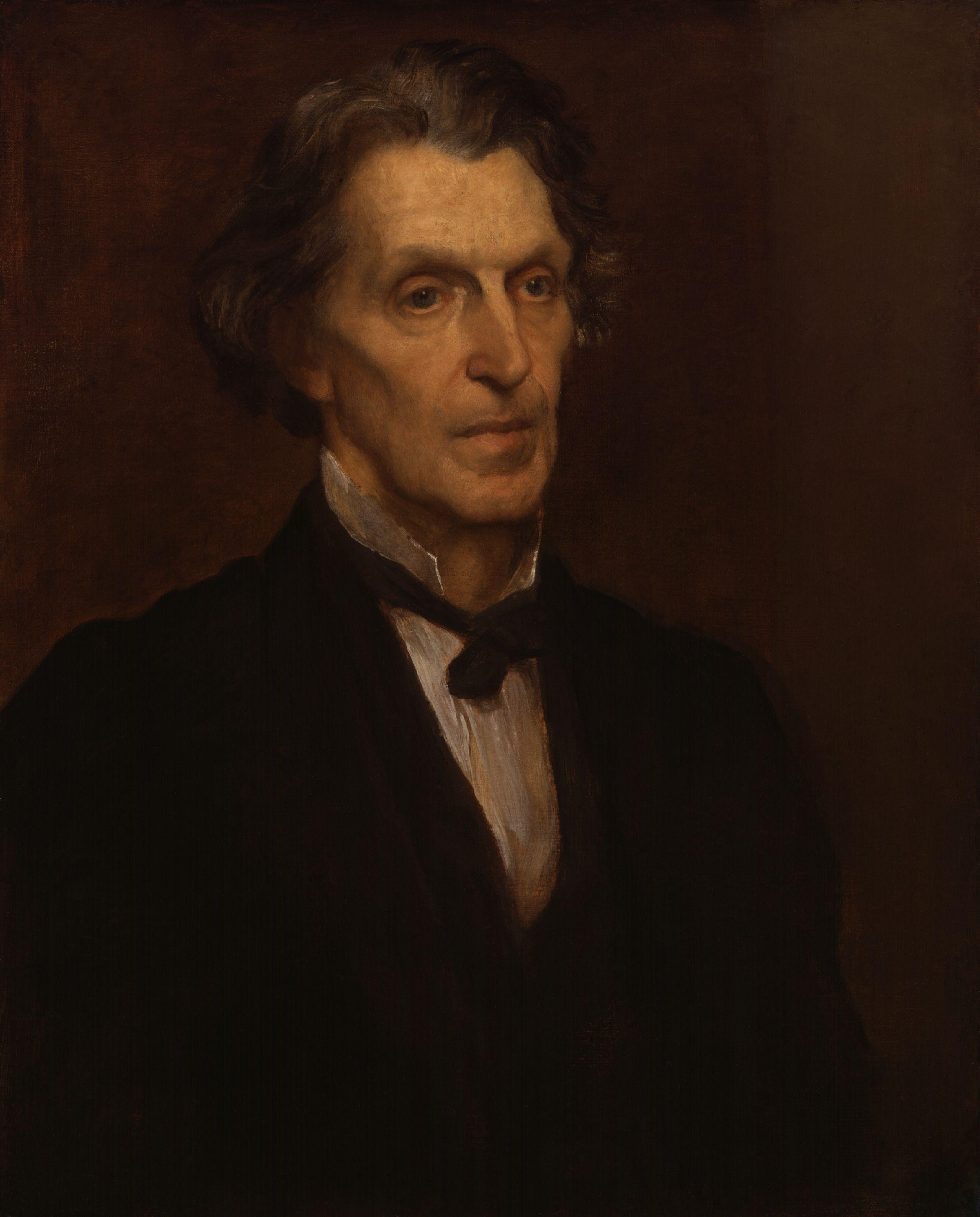
James Martineau - Replica (National Portrait Gallery) by George Frederic Watts, 1873

In 1839 Martineau came to the defence of Unitarian doctrine, under attack by Liverpool clergymen including Fielding Ould and Hugh Boyd M‘Neile. In the controversy, Martineau published five discourses, in which he discussed "the Bible as the great autobiography of human nature from its infancy to its perfection," "the Deity of Christ," "Vicarious Redemption," "Evil," and "Christianity without Priest and without Ritual."

In Martineau's earliest book, The Rationale of Religious Enquiry, published in 1836, he placed the authority of reason above that of Scripture; and he assessed the New Testament as "uninspired, but truthful; sincere, able, vigorous, but fallible." The book marked him down, among older British Unitarians, as a dangerous radical, and his ideas were the catalyst for a pamphlet war in America between George Ripley (who favored Martineau's questioning of the historical accuracy of scripture) and the more conservative Andrews Norton. Despite his belief that the Bible was fallible, Martineau continued to hold the view that "in no intelligible sense can any one who denies the supernatural origin of the religion of Christ be termed a Christian," which term, he explained, was used not as "a name of praise," but simply as " a designation of belief." He censured the German rationalists "for having preferred, by convulsive efforts of interpretation, to compress the memoirs of Christ and His apostles into the dimensions of ordinary life, rather than admit the operation of miracle on the one hand, or proclaim their abandonment of Christianity on the other".

=== Transcendentalism ===
Martineau came to know German philosophy and criticism, especially the criticism of Ferdinand Christian Baur and the Tübingen school, which affected his construction of Christian history. French influences were Ernest Renan and the Strassburg theologians. The rise of evolution compelled him to reformulate his theism. He addressed the public, as editor and contributor, in the Monthly Repository, the Christian Reformer, the Prospective Review, the Westminster Review and the National Review. Later he was a frequent contributor to the literary monthlies. More systematic expositions came in Types of Ethical Theory and The Study of Religion, and, partly, in The Seat of Authority in Religion (1885, 1888 and 1890). What did Jesus signify? This was the problem which Martineau attempted to deal with in The Seat of Authority in Religion.

Martineau's theory of religious society, or church, was that of an idealist. He propounded a scheme, which was not taken up, that would have removed the church from the hands of a clerical order, and allowed the coordination of sects or churches under the state. Eclectic by nature, he gathered ideas from any source that appealed. Stopford Brooke once asked A. P. Stanley, Dean of Westminster, "if the Church of England would broaden sufficiently to allow James Martineau to be made Archbishop of Canterbury".

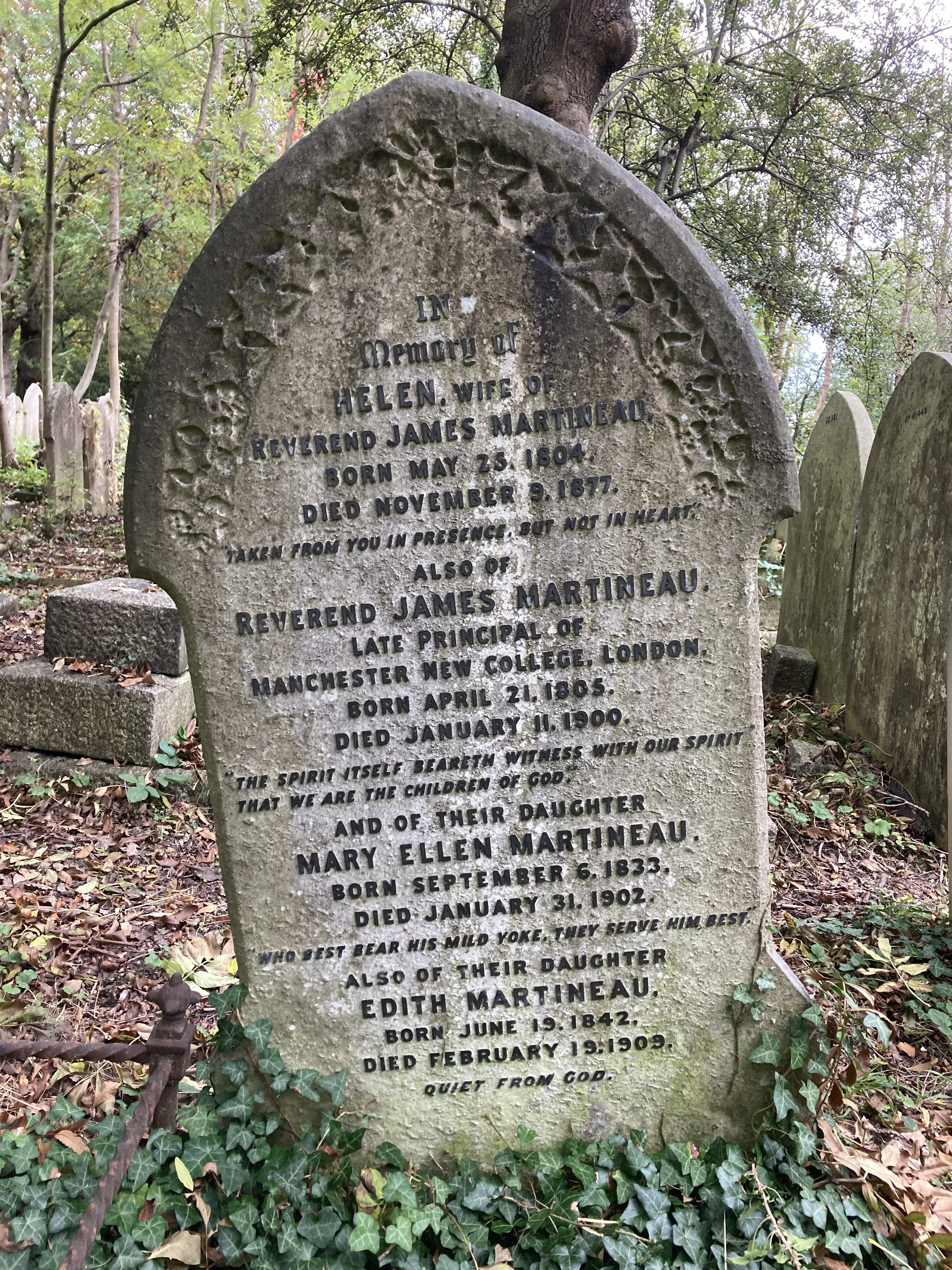
Family grave of James Martineau in Highgate Cemetery

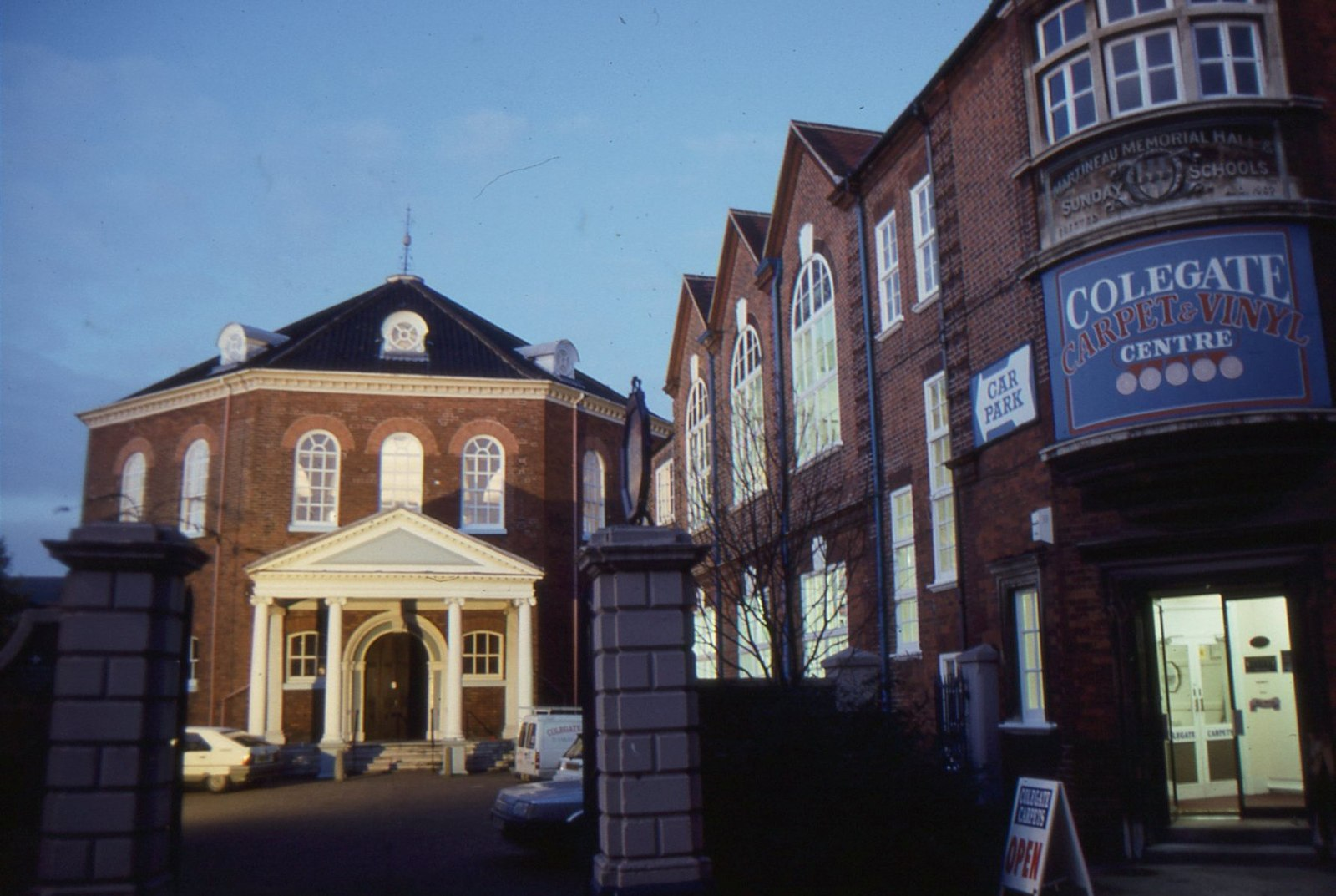
Norwich's Octagon Chapel and adjacent Martineau Memorial Hall (right)

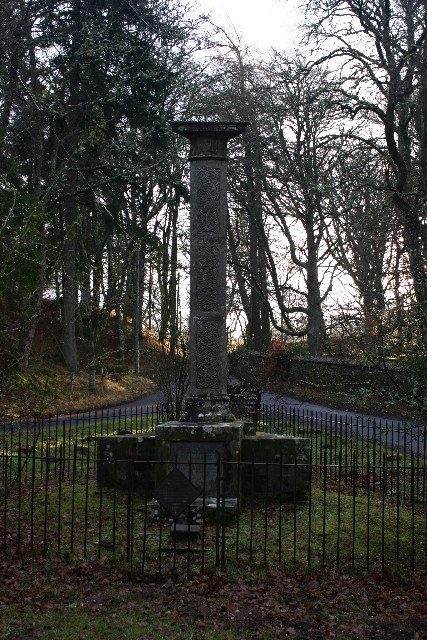
Memorial to Martineau, near Aviemore, Scotland

== Later years ==
Although he had opposed the removal (1889) of Manchester New College to Oxford, Martineau took part in the opening of the new buildings, conducting the communion service (19 October 1893) in the chapel of what is today Harris Manchester College, University of Oxford.

A wide circle of friends mourned his death on 11 January 1900; Oscar Wilde references him in his prose.

He was buried in a family grave on the eastern side of Highgate Cemetery. One of his daughters was the watercolourist Edith Martineau who was interred in the family grave in 1909. The Martineau Memorial Hall in Norwich was built in 1907 and named after celebrated members of the family who had long resided in the area and were deacons of the chapel to which the hall was attached. However, unofficially, the hall was named after James who had died within recent years having established the hall's Sunday school some decades earlier.

== Bibliography ==
- Endeavours after the Christian Life (1843);
- Miscellanies 1852;
- The Rationale of Religious Enquiry: or, The question stated of reason, the Bible, and the church; in six lectures (1853);
- Studies of Christianity : a series of papers (1858);
- A Study of Spinoza (1882)
- Types of Ethical Theory (1885)

== See also ==
- Free Christians (Britain)
- General Assembly of Unitarian and Free Christian Churches
- Unitarianism

== Sources ==
- J. Hunt, Religious Thought in England in the 19th Century (1896) pages 246–250;
- A. W. Jackson, James Martineau, a Biography and a Study (Boston, 1900);
- J. Drummond and C. B. Upton, Life and Letters (2 volumes, 1901);
- Henry Sidgwick, Lectures on the Ethics of Green, Spencer and Martineau (1902);
- A. H. Craufurd, Recollections of James Martineau (1903);
- J. E. Carpenter, James Martineau, Theologian and Teacher (1905);
- C. B. Upton, Dr. Martineau's philosophy, a survey (1905);
- Rowe, Mortimer (1959). The History of Essex Hall. London: Lindsey Press. Archived from the original on 16 January 2012.
- Frank Schulman, James Martineau: This Conscience-Intoxicated Unitarian (2002).

Attribution

Presbyterian Church titles
| Preceded by Philip Taylor; Joseph Hutton | Minister of Eustace Street Presbyterian Church, Dublin; 1828–1832; With: Philip Taylor, 1828-1831; Joseph Hutton, 1828–1832 | Succeeded by Joseph Hutton |
