= Guéridon =

Type of small table

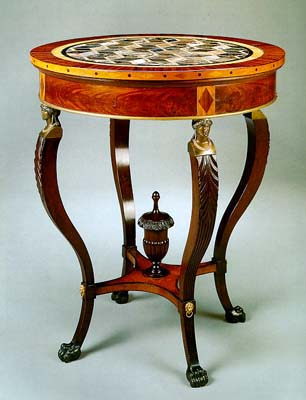
A c. 1810 guéridon by French-born American cabinetmaker Charles-Honoré Lannuier. Mahogany, satinwood, rosewood, and possibly sycamore veneers, gilded brass, and marble. Located in the Red Room of the White House.

A guéridon is a small table supported by one or more columns, or sculptural human or mythological figures, often with a circular top. The guéridon originated in France towards the middle of the 17th century. The supports for early guéridons were often modeled on ancient Egyptian and Greek as well as various African human traditional figures (inspired by caryatids).

While often serving humble purposes, such as to hold a candlestick or vase, the guéridon could be a high-style decorative piece of court furniture. By the time of Louis XIV's death in 1715, there were several hundred guéridons at Versailles, and within a generation they had taken on a nearly endless number of forms: columns, tripods, termini and mythological figures. Some of the simpler and more artistic forms were of wood carved with familiar decorative motives and gilded. Silver, enamel, and indeed almost any material from which furniture can be made have been used for their construction.

A variety of small occasional tables (those with no particular function) are now called guéridons in French.
