= Zelia Hoffman =

Zelia Krumbhaar Hoffman née Zelia Krumbhaar Preston, (1 April 1867 – 14 September 1929) was an American horticulturalist who moved to Britain where she was an active Liberal Party politician.

== Background ==
Zelia Krumbhaar Preston was born in Evansville, Indiana, in 1867. Her father was G.R. Preston, President of the Hibernian National Bank of New Orleans. She married Charles Frederick Hoffman, who died in 1919. She moved to Britain in 1919 and became a British subject in 1928.

== International Garden Club ==
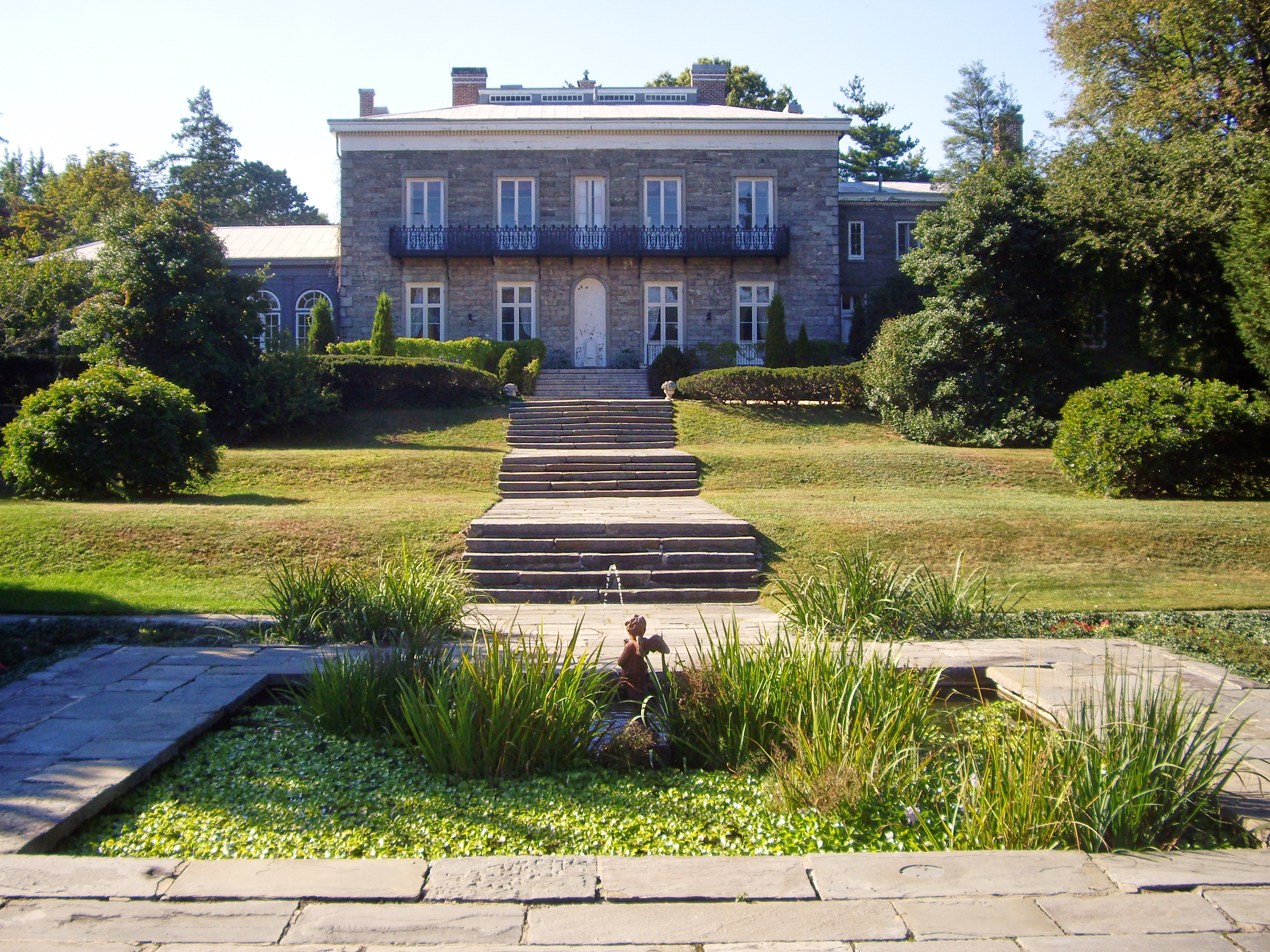
Bartow-Pell Mansion

Zelia Hoffman founded the International Garden Club, Inc. to promote formal gardens. In 1914, she leased from the City of New York, Bartow-Pell Mansion, which had been empty for many years. The mansion housed the club and the club undertook preservation and restoration work at the mansion.

== Politics ==
Zelia Hoffman was Vice President of the North Norfolk Liberal Association, and President of the North Ward branch. She was a Liberal candidate for the North Norfolk division at the 1929 General Election. She died just months after the election.

=== Electoral record ===
General Election 1929: Norfolk North
Party	Candidate	Votes	%	±%
Labour	Rt Hon. Noel Edward Buxton	14,544	47.5	−1.2
Unionist	Thomas Russell Albert Mason Cook	12,661	41.3	+0.7
Liberal	Zelia Krumbhaar Hoffman	3,403	11.1	+0.4
Majority		1,883	6.2	−1.9
Turnout			77.9	+0.8
Labour hold		Swing	-0.9	
