= Bartow–Pell Mansion =

Historic house in the Bronx, New York

- Bartow–Pell Mansion and Carriage House
- U.S. National Register of Historic Places
- U.S. National Historic Landmark
- New York State Register of Historic Places
- New York City Landmark
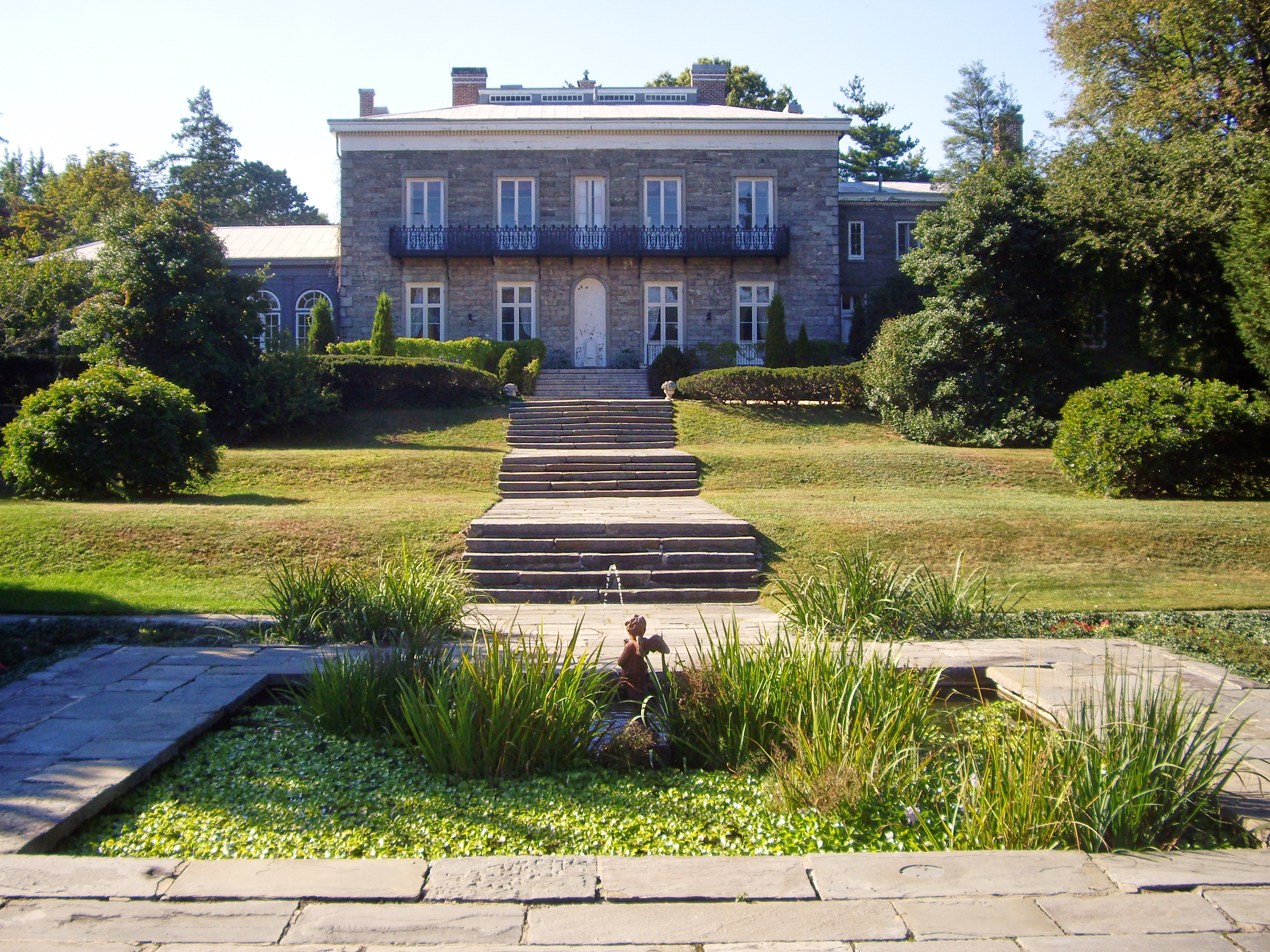
- Interactive map of Bartow–Pell Mansion and Carriage House
- Location: 895 Shore Road, Pelham Bay Park, Bronx, New York
- Coordinates: 40°52′19″N 73°48′20″W
- Built: 1836
- Architectural style: Greek Revival
- NRHP reference No.: 74001220
- NYSRHP No.: 00501.000013
- NYCL No.: 0125, 0886

Significant dates
- Added to NRHP: December 30, 1974
- Designated NHL: December 8, 1976
- Designated NYSRHP: June 23, 1980
- Designated NYCL: February 15, 1966 (exterior); May 27, 1975 (interior)

The Bartow–Pell Mansion is a historic house museum at Shore Road in the northern section of Pelham Bay Park, within the New York City borough of the Bronx. The two-story building, designed in the mid-19th century by an unknown architect, has a Greek Revival facade and federal interiors and is the last surviving manor house in the Pelham Bay Park area. The grounds surrounding the mansion take up 9 acres (3.6 ha) and include a three-story carriage house; terraced gardens overlooking Long Island Sound to the east; and a small burial plot for the Pell family, which once occupied the land.

The house sits on an estate that Thomas Pell purchased from the native Siwanoy in 1654; the Pell family built two previous residences on the grounds in both 1675 and 1790. Robert Bartow, a relative of the Pell family, built the third and current house at some point between 1836 and 1842. Ownership of the house remained in the Bartow and Pell families until 1888, when the government of New York City bought it, and the house remained empty until 1914 when the International Garden Club, co-founded by Zelia Hoffman and Alice Martineau, leased it. The IGC renovated the home into a clubhouse and moved in during 1915. Mayor Fiorello La Guardia used the mansion as his summer residence during 1936. The IGC opened part of the house to the public as a museum in May 1946 while continuing to use it as a clubhouse. The mansion's carriage house was restored between 1987 and 1993.

The house is oriented on a north-south axis with wings on either side, and has a stone facade with balconies and large windows. The interior of the mansion's first floor is arranged around a square central hall with an elliptical staircase; it includes two parlors, a sitting room and a small dining room. The second floor contains bedrooms, while the cellar was used for storing wine. The carriage house, which contained a stable hand's home, vehicular storage, and the hayloft, has served as an exhibition and educational space since 1993. Some of the furnishings include the desk of Aaron Burr and a Lannuier bed. The mansion's facade, interior, and surrounding grounds are designated as a New York City designated landmark and a National Historic Landmark.

== Site ==
The Bartow–Pell Mansion is located in the northern section of Pelham Bay Park in the Bronx in New York City. Although its official address is 895 Shore Road, the house is within a wooded portion of the park and is accessible only via a driveway extending 200 yards (180 m) off Shore Road. There is a parking lot in front of the mansion, at the end of the driveway. Rhododendrons and lilacs were planted along the driveway during the mid-20th century. The Bartow-Pell Woods and Pelham Bay Park's lagoon are to the east, while the Pelham Golf Course is to the northwest. Orchard Beach is across the lagoon. A hiking path called the Siwanoy Trail loops around the estate. The nearest New York City Subway station is the Pelham Bay Park station, located across the Hutchinson River. Bee-Line Bus's 45 route also stops outside the estate.

The mansion and its garden take up 9 acres (36,000 m^{2}) of Pelham Bay Park. Northeast of the mansion itself is the estate's carriage house. To the east of the mansion is a formal terraced garden, which slopes down gently toward the lagoon and Long Island Sound. As built, the garden is composed of several levels, with a sunken square fountain in the center and a set of steps on either side. During the spring through fall, the fountain was surrounded by rose and tulip beds. The other terraces were planted with petunias and yew trees, as well as dahlias, zinnias, asters, and chrysanthemums. The garden is surrounded by a 7-foot-tall (2.1 m) wall, which is made of locally sourced stone and was covered with wisteria. There are iron gates in the wall, as well as a wrought-iron fence above the wall on the eastern end of the garden. East of the fence was a lawn that overlooked the water, although Long Island Sound was no longer visible from the mansion by the 20th century. The Mary Ludington Herb Garden adjoins the terraced garden.

Just south of the Bartow–Pell Mansion was a tree named Treaty Oak. The Siwanoy Native American chief Wampage and English colonist Thomas Pell signed a treaty under the tree in 1654, in which Pell purchased all land east of the Bronx River in what was then Westchester County, New York. The oak tree, which was surrounded by a fence, was destroyed in 1906 and replanted in 1915. Approximately 100 yards (91 m) south of the house is a burial plot belonging to the Pell family, who had once occupied the site. This plot contains headstones dating from between 1748 and 1790. Surrounding the plot are four granite posts with pelican motifs, symbolizing the Pell family's coat of arms. There formerly may have been additional gravestones, but they were scattered throughout the grounds by the time the International Garden Club (IGC) took over in the early 20th century. A path lined with chestnut trees connects the house to the burial plot and Long Island Sound's shoreline.

== History ==
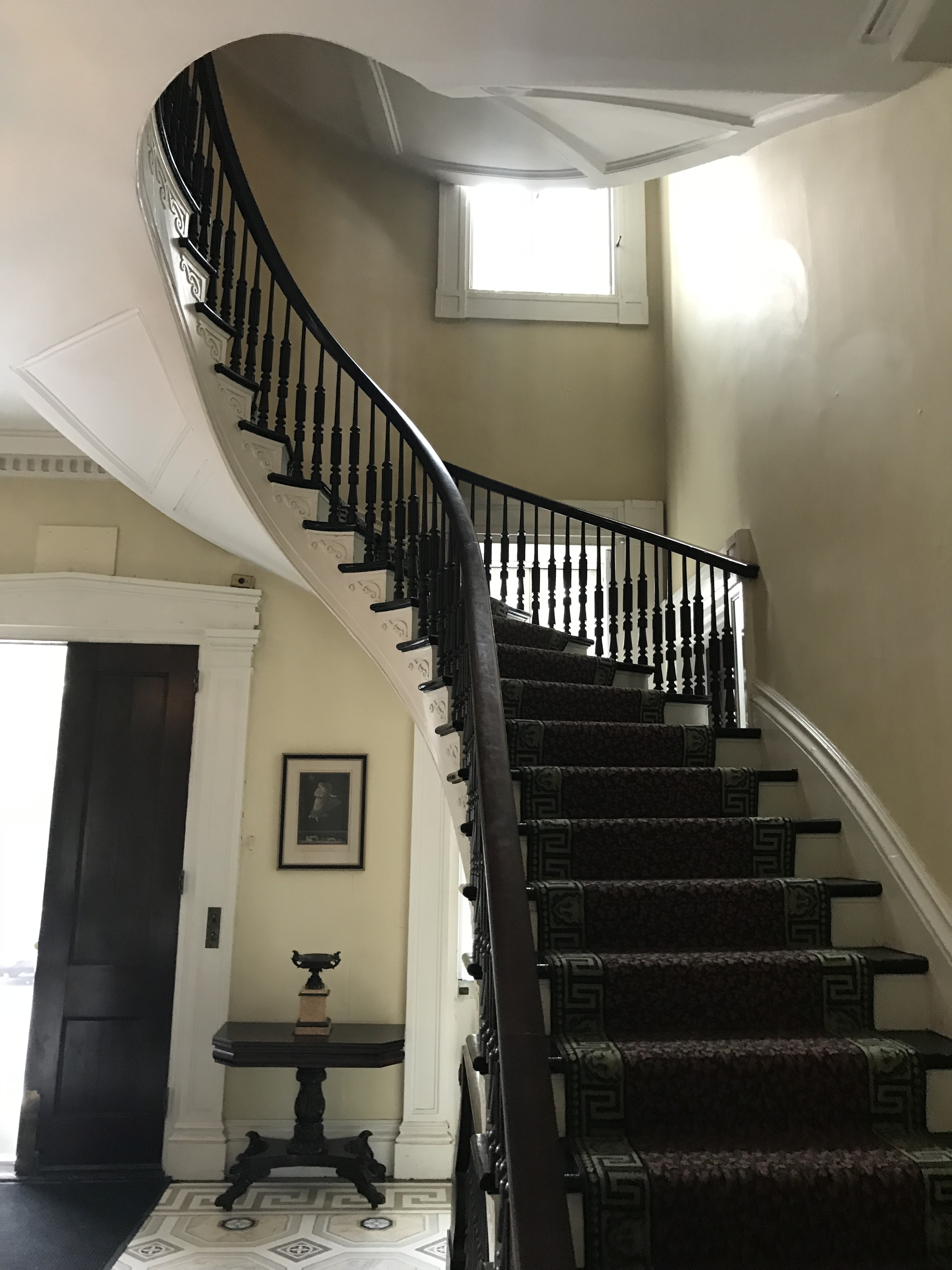
The main staircase in the mansion

In 1654, Thomas Pell purchased 50,000 acres (20,000 ha) from the Siwanoy, comprising the land of the current Pelham Bay Park as well as the nearby town of Pelham, New York, and made his estate on 9,188 acres (3,718 ha) of that land. Pell's land became known as Pelham Manor in 1666. In the 17th and 18th centuries, during the colonial era of the United States, various prominent families built houses within Pelham Manor, including the Bartow, Bayard, Burr, Fish, Leroy, Lorillard, and Pell families. By the 18th century, several members of the Pell family had married members of the Bartow family.

Thomas's nephew John built a residence close to Long Island Sound around 1675, about a decade after Pelham Manor was created. The house was located either east of Shore Road (Note: In the early 20th century, Shore Road was known as Eastern Boulevard.) or at the extreme end of Pelham Neck (which is located between Eastchester Bay and the Long Island South). This house was designed in an English style, with a facade of Holland brick. The first residence was occupied by three of Pelham Manor's lords of the manor before it burned in the American Revolutionary War. The second house, occupied by John Bartow and his wife and cousin Ann Pell Bartow, was erected circa 1790. The second house may have reused the foundation of John Pell's first house; at the time, it was common for buildings to reuse the foundations of demolished structures on the same site. The Bartows sold the estate in 1813 to the merchant Herman Leroy. The second house was likely demolished when the Leroys owned the estate.

=== Use as residence ===
Robert Bartow, a relative of the Pell family and one of John Bartow's grandsons, bought 30 acres (12 ha) of his ancestor's old estate in 1836. Robert Bartow and his wife Maria Lorillard Bartow built a mansion on the site, the third house to occupy the estate. Construction was complete on the Bartow Mansion and an adjacent carriage building by 1842, though the exact date of the house's construction is unknown. (Note: Some sources erroneously claim that the house predated 1836.) Robert Bolton's Guide to New Rochelle, published in 1842, stated that Robert Bartow "lately" constructed the mansion but did not specify further. The house had cost $60,000 (equivalent to $2,002,000 in 2025). When it was completed, the house was part of Westchester County, specifically in the town of Pelham, New York. The new mansion was sited to the southwest of the first manor house built in 1675.

The Bartow and Pell families alternately owned the building for the next four decades. Initially, Robert, Maria, and their seven children lived in the house. Robert Bartow died in 1868, and the mansion first went to his widow, then to his sons. The Bartow family occupied the mansion until at least 1883. In June 1884, Governor Grover Cleveland signed the New Parks Act into law, authorizing the creation of a system of parks in the Bronx, including Pelham Bay Park. The Bartows wanted the city to give them $467,953 for their property, although the city government had concluded that the estate was worth only $131,000.

Despite Pelham residents' opposition to the park, the New York City government acquired the land for Pelham Bay Park in 1887, and it officially became a park in 1888. The same year, the New York City government obtained the house from descendants of the Bartow family. The city paid $63,000 for the ground immediately surrounding the mansion, $33,000 for the mansion itself, and $94,625 for fourteen adjacent land lots, for a total of $190,625. The mansion was vacant for over two decades; during this time, the house fell into a severe state of neglect, and the grounds became overgrown. Although the house was owned by the New York City government, it was still part of Westchester County until 1894 or 1895, when the boundary between Westchester and the Bronx was moved northward. The Home for Crippled Children occupied the mansion for a short period in the early 20th century. The carriage house on the property was used for various purposes after being sold and was ultimately turned into storage.

=== Use as clubhouse ===
==== Renovation and reopening ====
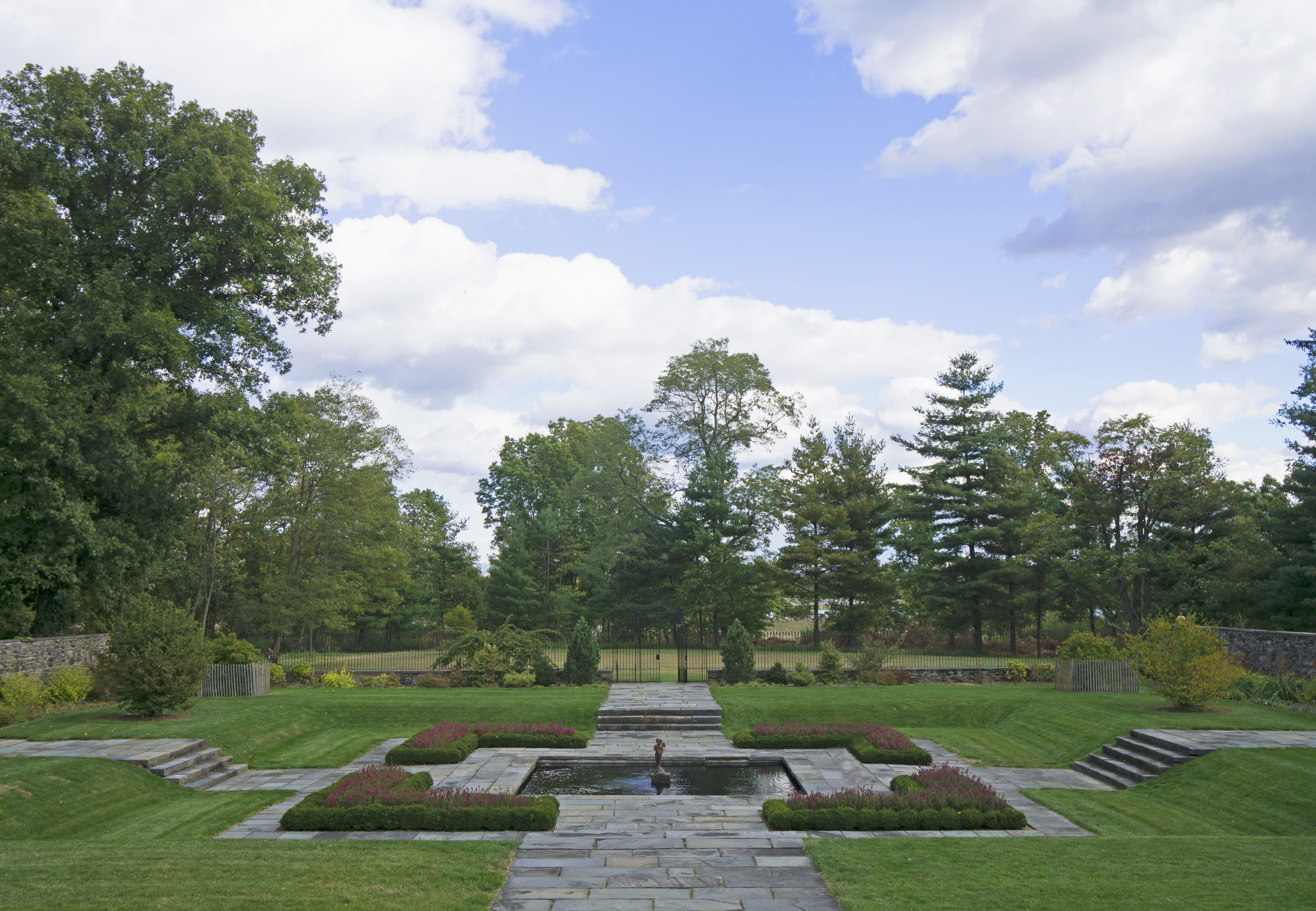
The mansion's terraced garden was added in the 1910s.

The New York City Department of Parks and Recreation (NYC Parks) leased the building to the International Garden Club in 1914. The IGC had been co-founded by Zelia Hoffman and Alice Martineau the previous year to promote formal gardens, and they wished to create an educational garden on the estate. In addition, the club wished to host exhibits and lectures, and it planned to curate a library in the mansion. The IGC agreed to lease the house and grounds for three years, landscape the grounds with their own funds, and return the property to the city after three years. The firm of Delano & Aldrich was hired to restore the home. The exterior was renovated, and the formal gardens were constructed from 1914 to 1917. The interior was also renovated to accommodate the clubhouse's functions, although the house's architectural details were preserved as much as possible. A designer identified only as Miss Swift redesigned the first floor, while Hoffman selected furnishings and decorations for the second floor. Sources disagree on whether the renovations cost $25,000 (equivalent to $796,000 in 2025) or $100,000 (equivalent to $3,183,000 in 2025).

The mansion opened as the IGC's headquarters on May 1, 1915, with a ceremony attended by New York governor Charles Whitman. As part of its lease with the city, the club had to open the mansion's gardens to the public. In its first three years at the mansion, the IGC spent over $70,000 on the house and often held public speeches. Initially, the house was open seven days a week; although the house was usually free to enter, the club collected admission fees on two days to pay for maintenance. The IGC was responsible for maintaining the house's interior and garden, while the city government oversaw the facade and the rest of the grounds. The club did not meet there during the summer. All of the other mansions nearby were gradually destroyed, leaving the Bartow Mansion as the only remaining mansion in Pelham Bay Park.

==== Mid-1910s through early 1940s ====
The IGC started hosting summertime outdoor flower shows in June 1916. The same year, Hoffman hired the landscape design firm Olmsted Brothers to discuss the possibility of adding a wide variety of gardens and a greenhouse. None of these ideas were ever implemented. The club renewed its contract with the city government in 1917 for five years. The following year, Bronx parks commissioner Joseph T. Hennessy unsuccessfully tried to evict the IGC from the mansion because of how they were using the grounds. The IGC had additional plans for the property, including a rock and rose garden and a painting collection, though these were delayed by World War I. In the 1920s and 1930s, the IGC continued to host its annual "garden parties" at the mansion, and it also hosted "distinguished foreigners" such as a member of the French Academy of Sciences. The mansion's driveway was modified in the 1930s, when a parking lot was added in front of the mansion.

New York City mayor Fiorello La Guardia announced in June 1936 that the mansion would be used as the city's first-ever "Summer City Hall"; this allowed him to be close to his family in Westport, Connecticut. La Guardia and several aides officially moved into the house on July 2, 1936. A temporary telephone line and a teleprinter were added to ease communication with people at City Hall in Manhattan. A temporary bus service to the New York City Subway's Pelham Bay Park station was established to transport people to the house, and officials even replaced a 135-year-old "10 Miles to City Hall" sign five miles away so that it directed visitors to the mansion, rather than to City Hall. Policemen on motorcycles traveled between the mansion and City Hall several times a day, although the mansion received relatively few visitors during La Guardia's time there. Although staffers and newspaper reporters alike complained because of the mansion's remoteness, La Guardia liked the house so much that he decided to stay for a week longer than he originally anticipated. La Guardia and his staff left on September 4.

La Guardia used the Bartow Mansion as a summer City Hall only in 1936; during the next several years, he moved his summertime offices to Queens. His successors did not use summertime City Halls. The IGC continued to use the building. The Manville family hosted a party to raise money for the mansion in 1937, and the club hosted a tour of the house in 1941 to raise money for the British during World War II.

=== Use as museum ===
==== 1940s to 1970s ====
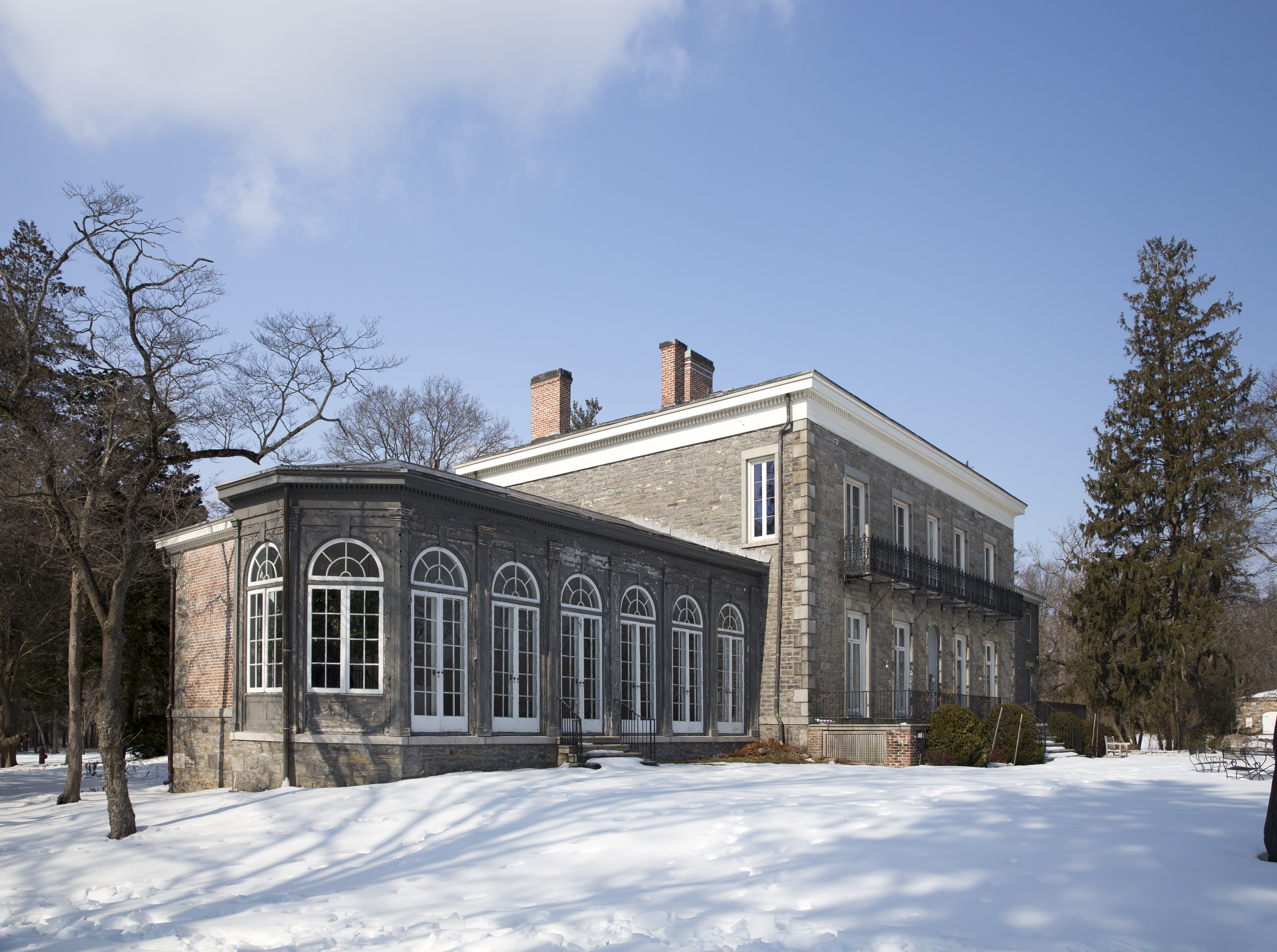
The orangery at the south end of the house

Following World War II, the IGC was no longer allowed to export or import plants, so it turned its efforts to renovating the house. The club renovated the mansion into a historic house museum, which opened in May 1946. NYC Parks, the Museum of the City of New York, Brooklyn Museum, and the Metropolitan Museum of Art assisted with the renovation. Initially, the Bartow Mansion Museum consisted of only four rooms: the entrance hall, dining room, parlor, and second-floor master bedroom. The IGC re-furnished the house with the assistance of the three larger museums' staff. A former president of the IGC, Mrs. Eliot Tuckerman, received an award in 1947 for her role in restoring the mansion. Initially, the house was open as a museum only on Tuesdays and Saturdays. Club members, who could visit at any time, had to cover their shoes with rubber covers to avoid damaging the rugs.

The house was renamed the Bartow–Pell Mansion in 1959, in honor of the original landowners. By the 1960s, the house invited visitors three days a week, although the garden was open every day. The IGC continued to lease the house from the city government in the 1960s, paying $1 a year and taking responsibility for maintenance. In 1963, the club upgraded the kitchen and pantry at a cost of $14,000. During the late 20th century, the mansion comprised either 10, 11, or 12 rooms.

The Bartow–Pell Mansion Museum was still open to the public three days a week in the 1970s. The museum saw few visitors because of its remoteness (a Los Angeles Times article from 1975 wrote that "the building is largely deserted"); meanwhile, its proximity to population centers made the estate vulnerable to trespassers. The IGC continued to use the mansion as its headquarters, and it renovated one of the rooms during the mid-1970s. The museum received $6,000 in 1977 to renovate the carriage house after it raised matching funds. The next year, the New York state government provided $1.3 million for repairs and upgrades to 58 historical buildings across New York state, including the Bartow–Pell Mansion. Mary Means Huber, the mansion's curator in the late 20th century, refurbished a second-floor sitting room after joining the museum in the late 1970s. Under Huber's tenure, the museum, whose collection largely consisted of items borrowed from other museums, began buying its own furnishings.

==== 1980s and 1990s ====
The museum began hosting educational programs c. 1984, which attracted 1,500 students annually within three years. The brickwork and wooden floors of the mansion's carriage house had become degraded, and work on the project began in 1986. Jan Hird Pokorny was hired to carry out the carriage house's renovation. The New York State Office of Parks, Recreation and Historic Preservation provided $110,000 in late 1987 for the restoration of the carriage house. As a precondition of the state grant, museum officials had to raise an equivalent amount; the museum had raised $110,000 from NYC Parks and $150,000 from several donors and foundations. The following August, the city agreed to give $150,000 if donors raised three times that amount. The entirety of the carriage house's renovation was expected to cost $875,000, much of which had been raised by late 1988. The project also included new educational programs within the carriage house. The Bartow-Pell Landmark Fund also received $6,000 to create a cutaway model of the carriage house.

The stabilization of the carriage house had been completed by 1989. The house was still obscure; the New York Daily News wrote the same year that the Bartow–Pell Mansion was "possibly the least-known of all the historic houses in the Bronx". The Bartow–Pell Mansion was one of the founding members of the Historic House Trust, established in 1989. At the time, the main house's roof needed to be replaced. Students from Brooklyn College conducted excavations around the house's site between 1990 and 1992, and several hundred trees were planted just north of the mansion in 1992. The carriage house was officially rededicated in 1993 after its renovation was complete. The IGC, which no longer operated as a garden club nor operated internationally, still supported the museum's operation, but the Bartow Pell Landmark Fund operated the museum.

==== 2000s to present ====
The IGC repainted the rooms in the late 1990s and early 2000s and expanded its collection during that time. By 2002, the museum's new director Robert Engel planned to renovate the entrance, demolish the parking lot, and clear a site between the carriage house and garden. As part of a promotional agreement with the New York City government, The History Channel agreed in 2004 to donate money to finance the preservation of the mansion and other historical sites in the city. Adventures in Preservation started funding the preservation of the Bartow–Pell Mansion in 2008; the same year, the IGC became the Bartow-Pell Conservancy. Between 2008 and 2011, the Bartow-Pell Conservancy re-landscaped the garden and planted new flower beds, while NYC Parks planted native plants north of the mansion. Concurrently, the museum created a master plan for the garden, which included restoring a sightline from the house to Long Island Sound. NYC Parks began receiving bids in 2009 for a restoration of the mansion's exterior, but they did not select any of these bids.

The Bartow–Pell Mansion Museum participated in a 2012 competition administered by Partners in Preservation (a partnership between the National Trust for Historic Preservation and American Express). After a social-media campaign that attracted participants from as far as Australia and Sweden, Partners in Preservation gave the Bartow–Pell Mansion Museum $155,000 for a restoration of the terraced garden and chestnut-tree walkway. Mark K. Morrison Associates was hired to rebuild the garden, add new plantings, and restore the garden's gates. The gardens were redesigned using photographs of Delano & Aldrich's original garden. In addition, the roof was repaired in 2012 following Hurricane Sandy, and the Historic House Trust hired Fifty-Three Renovations in 2013 to restore the mansion's interior. A $1.7 million renovation of the mansion's exterior commenced in April 2015, and that work was finished the next year.

The attic was opened to the public in June 2018. The Bartow–Pell Mansion Museum received 20,000 visitors annually by 2019. The mansion was closed temporarily in 2020 due to the COVID-19 pandemic in New York City, although the mansion had live-in caretakers who continued to maintain the property.

== Architecture ==
=== Mansion ===
It is not known who designed the Bartow–Pell Mansion, although the engineer and historian Reginald Pelham Bolton claimed in 1930 that John Bolton, one of his uncles, built the mansion. The exterior is designed in the Greek Revival style, with decorations inspired by the work of architect Minard Lafever. There are unproven claims that Lafever designed the mansion, in part because he designed a church that Robert Bartow's brother attended. A. J. Davis and Martin E. Thompson were also cited as the possible architects of the structure. The interiors are designed in the Federal style. Along with the Van Cortlandt House, the Bartow–Pell Mansion is one of two remaining manor houses in the Bronx.

==== Exterior ====
The house is oriented on a north-south axis, with wings on either side. The facade is made of plain cut stone, which was sourced from the surrounding area. The exterior walls are at least 2 feet (0.61 m) thick, allowing the mansion to remain cool even during the summer. There is a painted cornice at the top of the facade, as well as beveled quoins at each corner.

The western facade, facing Shore Road, was decorated with iron balconies, shutters, and window trimmings. The main entrance, on the western facade, is through a set of double doors flanked by a protruding iron balustrade. There is an empty niche above the double doors. The eastern facade, facing Long Island Sound, has iron balconies on the first and second stories, with windows that open onto the balconies. All of the balconies are made of elaborately decorated iron and are painted black. The large windows and the design of the stonework were typical of structures built in the area during the late 1830s and early 1840s.

==== Interior ====
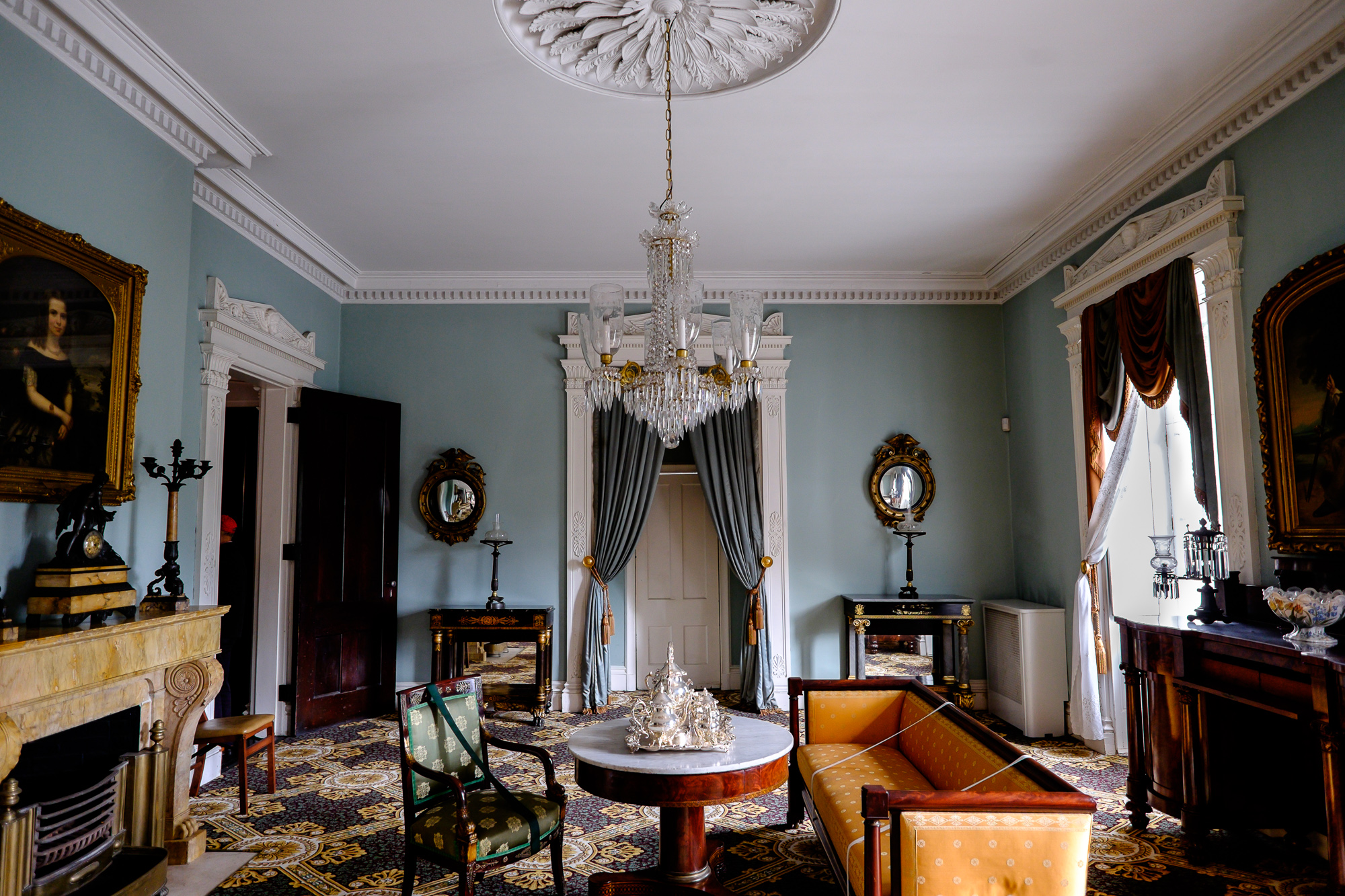
View of one of the first-floor rooms

The interior of the first floor is arranged symmetrically around the west-east axis. The entrance leads to a square central hall. Within this hall is a curving elliptical stairway that ascends to the attic and descends to the basement. The stairway has a balustrade with turned wood balusters and a newel post with a volute; it is illuminated by a clerestory window at the attic. The hallway itself has a plasterwork cornice and a rosette on the ceiling. On either wall are window openings and doorways, each of which is flanked by paneled pilasters and topped by a wooden pediment. Decorations such as eagles and depictions of Cupid are placed within the pilasters, while the tops of each pilaster depict honeysuckles and acanthus leaves. When the house was renovated in 1915, the halls had white woodwork and mahogany doors.

At the eastern end of the central hall is a niche flanked by doorways, which in turn lead to two elaborate, symmetrical parlors (a dining room and a drawing room) on the eastern side of the first floor. Each of these rooms measures about 30 by 20 feet (9.1 by 6.1 m). The drawing room is to the left or north, while the dining room was to the right or south. The doorways from the central hall to each room are flanked by pilasters with anthemion motifs and Corinthian-style capitals, as well as a pediment above each doorway. The pediment above the drawing room depicts an eagle, while the pediment above the dining room's doorway depicts a cherub. Both rooms contain fireplaces with marble mantelpieces; the shelves of each mantelpiece are supported by brackets with palmettes. The center of each room's ceiling contains a rosette that is more ornate than that in the central hallway. Two medallions were also placed on one wall of the drawing room. There are sliding doors between the parlors, as well as French doors leading from either parlor to the terraced garden.

To the right of the central hall, one door leads to another door that connects with a small sitting room. Both doorways have paneled pilasters and wooden pediments akin to those in the central hall, and the sitting room itself has a black marble mantelpiece. To the left of the central hall, a similar set of doorways leads to a smaller dining room, which shares design features with the sitting room. The small dining room hosted luncheons and breakfasts. There is also a kitchen that is shared by the main museum and a separate caretaker's apartment.

The second floor contains four bedrooms. Unlike the first-floor rooms, the bedrooms have plain design elements, including white-marble mantelpieces and molded trimmings. Each bedroom had a high ceiling to accommodate the large wardrobes and beds that were used in these rooms. One of the bedrooms, known as "Clarina's Room" after one of the Bartows' daughters, was used by at least one of the family's three daughters. Another bedroom, the nursery wing, is not publicly accessible. There is also a two-bedroom apartment for the house's live-in caretaker on the second floor. The third floor, also known as the attic, was used as a servants' quarters. The basement contained a wine cellar.

After the house was renovated by the IGC in 1915, the right or south wing of the house contained an "orangery" for serving tea. The orangery, also described as a conservatory, was described by Harper's Bazaar as having French windows, white walls, cement floors, and a domed ceiling. One of the smaller rooms in the northern wing was turned into a secondary reception room with a green, black, and coral color scheme, while another room became a boardroom with gray walls and black marble mantel. A stair led to the IGC's writing room and library on the northern wing's second floor.

=== Carriage house ===
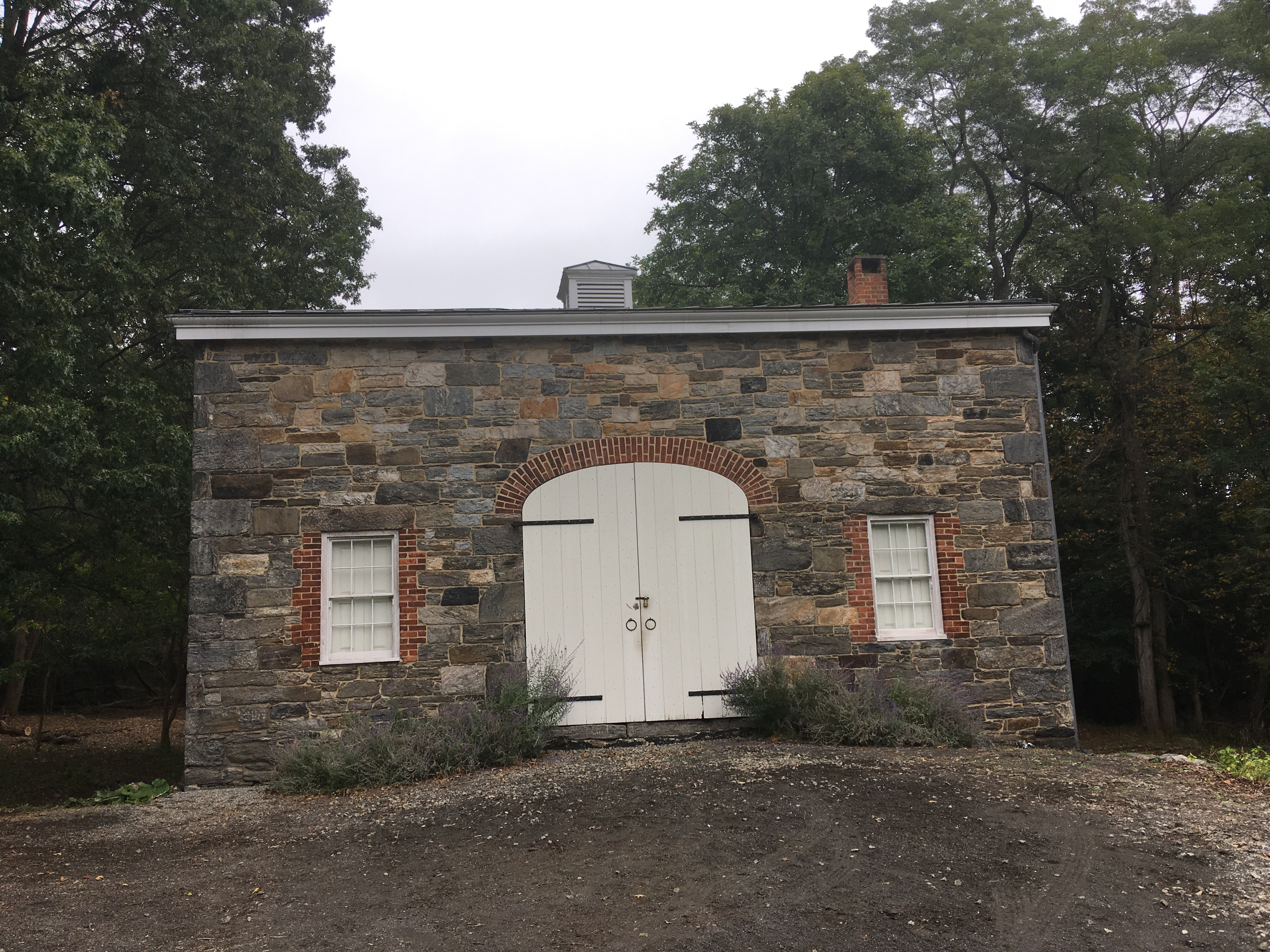
Carriage house

The carriage house was built no later than 1842 and is the last remaining outbuilding on the Bartow–Pell Mansion's site. It is also the last remaining masonry carriage house in New York City that retains its original design. The three-story building was built into the slope of a hill, making it appear two stories tall on one side. Although it was common for mid-19th-century carriage houses to be built on hillsides, the hill surrounding the Bartow-Pell carriage house is artificial, with downward slopes to the north, east, and south. The stable was constructed of the same locally sourced stone as the main mansion. On the front or west facade is an elliptical brick arch flanked by a rectangular window with a brick frame and stone lintel.

Inside the carriage house was the stable hand's home, vehicular storage, and the hayloft. Originally, the carriage house's main level had a carriage room, stalls, and harness room. The rooms were partitioned so the horses' stalls were separated from the harness and carriage rooms, the latter two of which were intended as "clean areas". Each stall was no more than 5 feet (1.5 m) wide and had a gutter to drain away horses' urine into the cellar. The attic contained the hayloft and could be accessed only via a ladder in the stall area. It is not known how hay was hoisted into the attic, but there may have been an exterior loading platform and a stair to ground level near the carriage house's northwest corner. The attic likely also included a cupola and air gaps on its roof for ventilation. The cellar contained a cistern and two disconnected rooms. The cistern may have used water that was collected in gutters on the roof.

== Operations ==
The New York City Department of Parks and Recreation owns the house. The mansion and garden are operated by the Bartow-Pell Conservancy, formerly the International Garden Club. The museum itself is operated by the Bartow Pell Landmark Fund, which has been listed as a tax-exempt nonprofit organization since October 1975. As of 2023, the mansion operates as a museum three days a week; although the gardens are free to visit, the mansion has an admission fee. The house is not wheelchair-accessible, as the main entrance can only be accessed by a short flight of steps, and there is no elevator. As of 2023, Alison McKay is the Bartow–Pell Mansion Museum's executive director.

=== Collection and exhibits ===
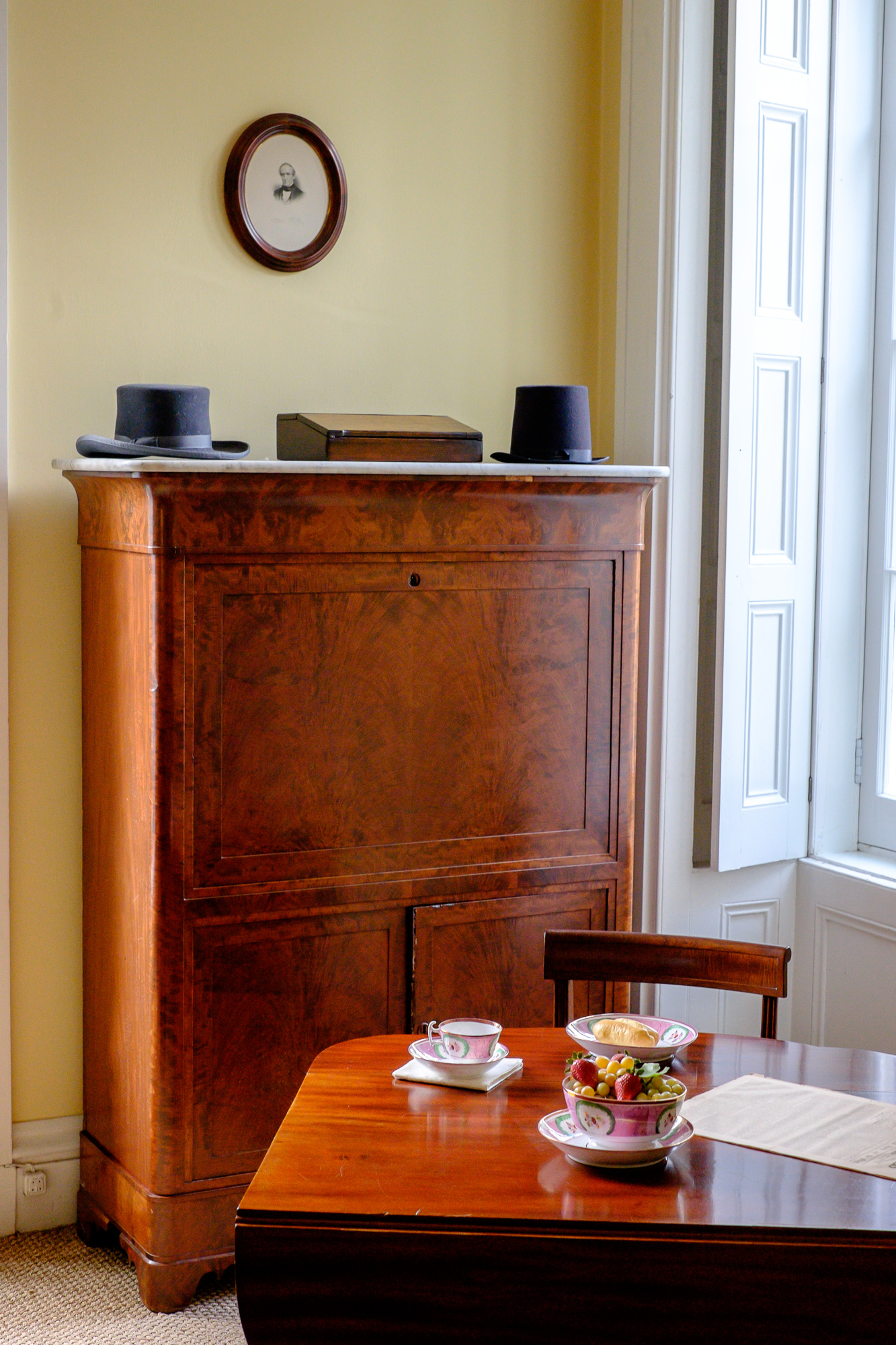
Some of the items in the mansion's collection

In the mid-20th century, many of the mansion's furnishings were displayed on loan from larger museums. A news article from the 1960s described the house as having Savonnerie carpets, Aubusson tapestries, and Turkish rugs. In addition, there were furnishings in the Empire, Federal, and Regency styles, as well as an authentic Lannuier bed. By the 1970s, the furniture displayed at the mansion was made of dark fine-grained wood, ornamented with features such as white marble, carvings, or gold paint. The furniture included less ornate sofas with feet shaped like lions' paws; more elaborate neoclassical sofas and chairs with wooden borders and carved legs; and a tall bed with a covering at its top. The bedrooms included the "Pell room", decorated with a portrait of John Pell and a carpet; the "red" room, with mahogany linen-press; and the "yellow" room, with a Duncan Phyfe bed. Also on display was a piece of Treaty Oak. The dining and drawing rooms had satin curtains, lamps, gilded-bronze fireplace mantel clocks, chandeliers, landscapes of New York state, and portraits from the 1830s.

In the 1970s, the museum began acquiring items for its own collection. By the 1980s, the interiors were painted green, blue, and pink to evoke Pompeiian ruins, and they were furnished with Italianate and Greek decorations. The front hall had a marble bust depicting Julius Caesar, the parlors had urns, and the top of the main stairway had a statue of Venus. According to a New York Times article from that decade, about half of the furniture at the time came from the Garden Club. In the 2000s, the house still displayed artifacts loaned by other museums, but it also displayed Bartow family artifacts.

Some of the mansion's modern-day furnishings include the desk of Aaron Burr, who married a distant Bartow relative, Theodosia. The Lannuier bed, which has a white-and-orange canopy, also remains in the collection. Modern objects also include two 19th-century wooden tables, a mahogany library table, a Pembroke table, a fire screen with desk, two side chairs, and a rosewood barometer. The three rooms on the carriage house's main floor are outfitted with exhibits, while the carriage house's lower level contains an education gallery and an architecture and transportation gallery. There have also been temporary exhibits over the years, such as a display of gardening tools in 2012 and an exhibit of objects relating to the house's history in 2014.

=== Events and programming ===
Starting in 1984, the museum has hosted educational programs. When the carriage house reopened in 1993, the museum allowed students to participate in live reenactments of coachmen's lives, and videos were displayed in the carriage room's education gallery. As of 2023, the museum operates several educational programs for school classes, including courses on gardening, the habitat of the nearby woodlands, Lenape history, and the lives of the Bartow family and servants. The programming is largely targeted toward elementary school students. The museum also operates after-school programs and a summer camp for children. Visitors can see the museum without needing to book in advance, though museum staff also provide guided tours of the mansion. The museum has also provided local-history programs.

In the Bartow–Pell Mansion Museum's early years, the Garden Club hosted a variety of events to raise money, including tours, autumn festivals, and fashion shows with tea. The mansion also hosted debutante balls, weddings, cotillions, and Christmas sales. In addition, the club had an active planting program, which in the late 1950s included dozens of perennial plantings each year. The house continued to host events such as debutante balls and Christmas boutiques through the 1970s. By the late 20th and early 21st centuries, the house hosted events such as luncheons, architectural tours, St. Nicholas Day Festivals, Open House New York events, and Halloween tours. The mansion has also hosted recurring events such as the Friends of Pelham Bay Park's autumn galas, Historic House Festivals, and movie nights.

== Impact ==
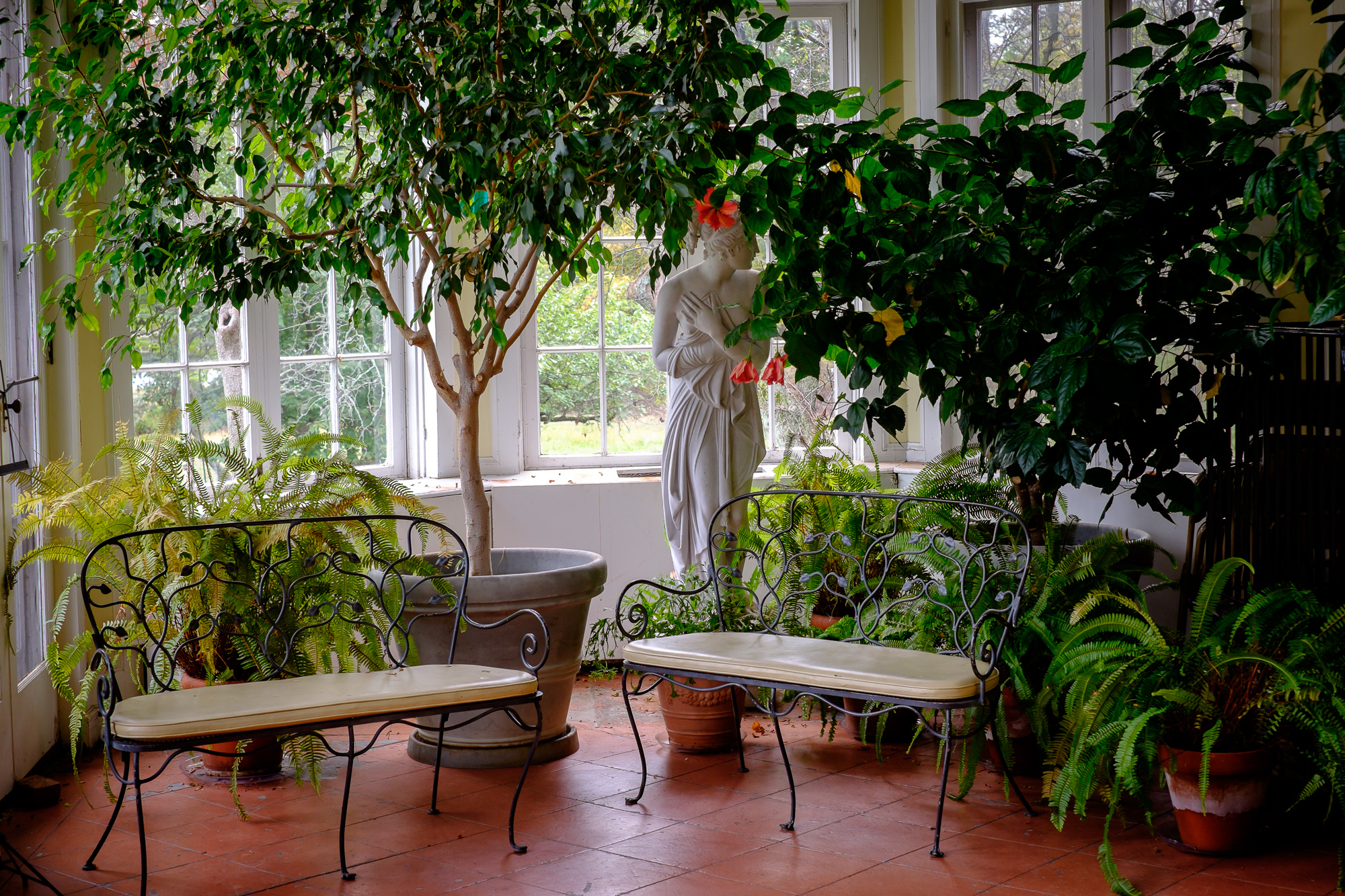
Plants in the orangery

In the 1880s, the New-York Tribune wrote that the mansion "has the solid and substantial appearance of an English country-house", declaring it to be one of the best country estates in Pelham Bay Park. After the mansion was converted to a clubhouse in 1915, a writer for Harper's Bazaar said that the mansion "will no longer be a reproach to the City of New York". Another critic wrote for The Sun that the house "is full of interest and charm to all who delight in perfectly proportioned rooms, genuine wood carving over doors, beautiful mantels, and the best kind of elegant simplicity". A 1944 book said that the house "in its completeness, its elegance, and its beauty, is the product of a designer of great skill". A reporter wrote in 1975 that the ornate and expansive interiors "provided a fitting setting for the life of" its residents.

In 1947, a year after the house was converted into a museum, a writer for The Christian Science Monitor said that both the Garden Club and Mrs. Eliot Tuckerman should be credited "for vision and persistence in restoring the beautiful old Bartow Mansion in Pelham Bay Park, not only to usefulness, but to be open to the public". A critic for The New York Times said in 1970 that the house's decorative elements, such as the windows, roof, and interiors, contributed to its Greek Revival "grandeur". A writer from the same newspaper described the mansion as "almost buried treasure" in 1987, while a reporter for the Philadelphia Inquirer said in 1984 that it was a "Greek Revival masterpiece". The Washington Post called the house "an exquisite enclave of peace and history, little-known to New Yorkers". In the 2000s, a Christian Science Monitor writer described the house and grounds as a "further challenge to the hard-boiled reputation of the Bronx" and a remnant of the borough's rural past, while Mimi Sheraton of the Times said that the house and gardens were both evidence of its occupants' luxurious lifestyle and a reminder that none of the other mansions in the area remained.

The New York City Landmarks Preservation Commission (LPC) designated the mansion's exterior as a New York City landmark in 1966. The LPC held hearings in 1975 to determine whether the Bartow–Pell Mansion's first-floor interior should be designated as a landmark. The LPC designated the interiors of the Bartow–Pell Mansion, Federal Hall's rotunda, and the Morris–Jumel Mansion as landmarks on May 26, 1975, and the New York City Board of Estimate ratified these designations that July. The mansion became a National Historic Landmark on December 8, 1976, and the IGC received a "certificate of proof" for the National Historic Landmark designation the next year. The exterior-landmark designation was extended in 1978 to cover the carriage house, gardens, and Pell family graveyard; the expanded designation covers 60 acres (24 ha) of the park.

== See also ==
- List of museums and cultural institutions in New York City
- List of New York City Designated Landmarks in the Bronx
- National Historic Landmarks in New York City
- National Register of Historic Places listings in the Bronx
