= Philip Martineau =

English cricketer and solicitor

Personal information
- Full name: Philip Hubert Martineau
- Born: 28 October 1862; St Pancras, London, England
- Died: 7 October 1944 (aged 81); Sunningdale, Berkshire, England
- Bowling: Left-arm fast-medium

Domestic team information
- Years: Team
- 1883: MCC
- FC debut: 9 July 1883 MCC v Derbyshire
- Last FC: 30 July 1883 MCC v Somerset

Career statistics
Competition	First-class
Matches	2
Runs scored	27
Batting average	6.75
100s/50s	0/0
Top score	14
Catches/stumpings	0/–
- Source: CricketArchive, 13 April 2008

Sir Philip Hubert Martineau (28 October 1862 – 7 October 1944) was an English solicitor who became President of the Law Society. He was also a cricketer who played for Marylebone Cricket Club (MCC) as a left-arm fast-medium bowler.

== Biography ==
Born in London in 1862, Martineau was educated at Harrow School and played for the cricket team there in 1880 and 1881. He was a student at Trinity College, Cambridge, graduating BA in 1884. He became a solicitor and was elected president of the Law Society in 1931-32 and knighted in the 1933 New Year Honours. He married Alice Margaret Vaughan-Williams. Their oldest son was Hubert Martineau. Their second son was Philip Brian (1898 - 1983) who married Eileen Combe, daughter of Richard Combe (great-grandson Harvey Christian Combe) and Lady Constance Augusta (1859-1941), who was the daughter of George Conyngham, 3rd Marquess Conyngham).

== Cricket career ==
He made his first-class debut in 1883 for the MCC against Derbyshire.

Following a minor match against Northumberland in July of that year, he played his second and final first-class match for the MCC against Somerset.

He died in Sunningdale in 1944, survived by his son Hubert, who also played first-class cricket. Two cousins, Alfred and Lionel also played first-class cricket.
