= Alfred Martineau (cricketer) =

English cricketer

Personal information
- Born: 11 November 1868; Esher, Surrey, England
- Died: 2 February 1940 (aged 71); Rubislaw, Aberdeen, Scotland
- Batting: Right-handed
- Bowling: Right-arm slow

Domestic team information
- Years: Team
- 1889: Cambridge University
- FC debut: 20 May 1889 Cambridge University v MCC
- Last FC: 23 May 1889 Cambridge University v AJ Webbe's XI

Career statistics
| Competition | First-class |
|---|---|
| Matches | 2 |
| Runs scored | 4 |
| Batting average | 1.33 |
| 100s/50s | 0/0 |
| Top score | 2 |
| Balls bowled | 120 |
| Wickets | 1 |
| Bowling average | 65.00 |
| 5 wickets in innings | 0 |
| 10 wickets in match | 0 |
| Best bowling | 1/65 |
| Catches/stumpings | 0/– |
- Source: CricketArchive, 13 April 2008

Alfred Martineau (11 November 1868 – 2 February 1940) was an English cricketer.

Alfred Martineau was educated at Uppingham School and King's College, Cambridge. A right-handed batsman and right-arm slow bowler, he played two first-class matches for Cambridge University in 1889. His brother Lionel also played first-class cricket, as did his cousins Hubert and Philip.
