= Edith Martineau =

British painter (1842–1909)

- Born: 19 June 1842; Liverpool, United Kingdom
- Died: 19 February 1909 (aged 66); London, United Kingdom
- Known for: Painting
- Movement: Pre-Raphaelite

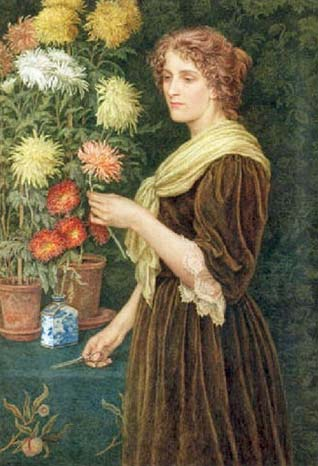
Edith Martineau - Kvinna med blommor

Edith Martineau (19 June 1842 – 19 February 1909) was a British watercolour painter.

== Biography ==
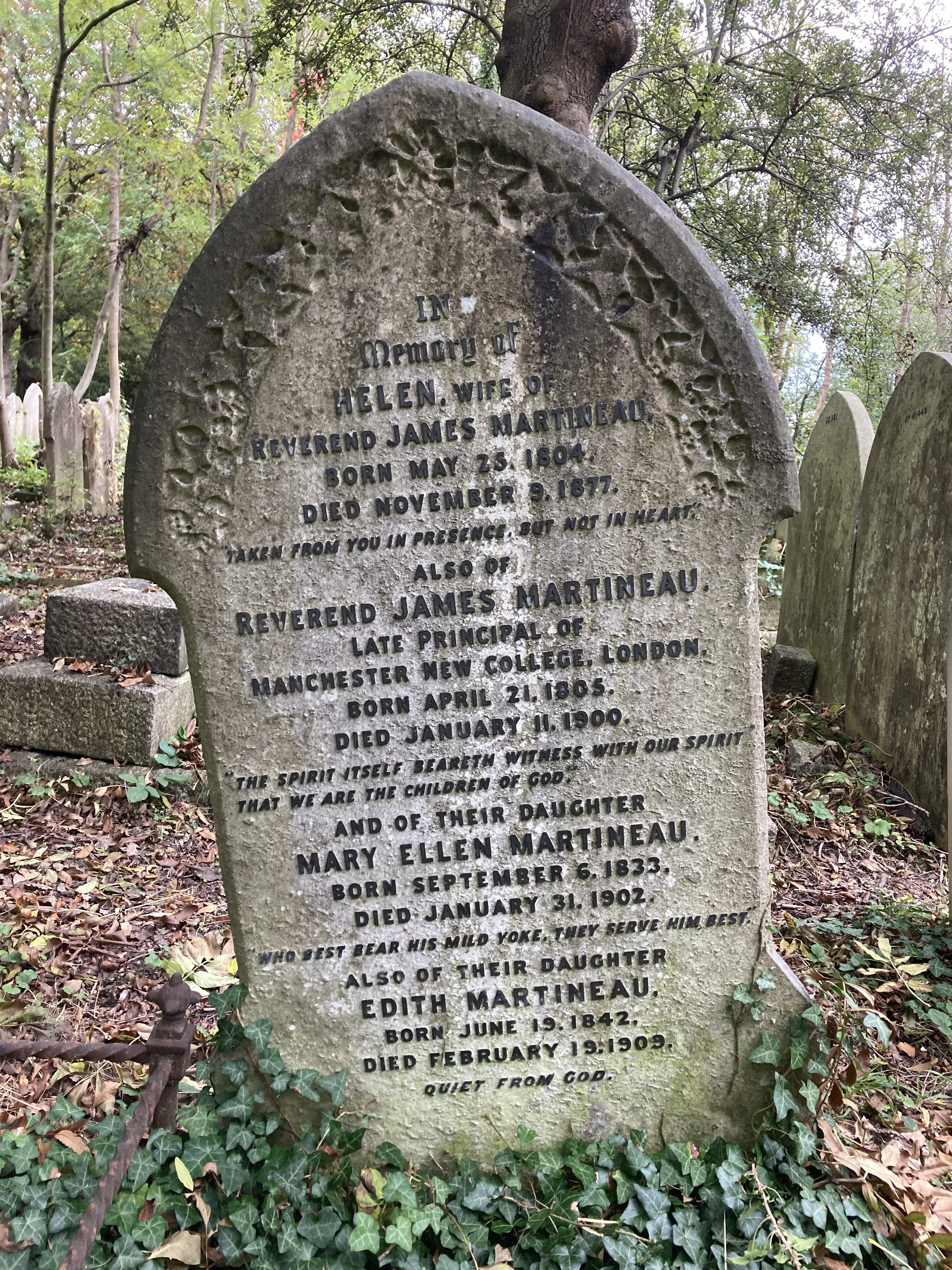
Family grave of Edith Martineau in Highgate Cemetery

Martineau was born in Liverpool as the daughter of Dr. James Martineau, an eminent Unitarian minister. She was trained first at the Liverpool School of Art but moved with her family to London, where she began following classes at Leigh's School of Art. She submitted her work to the Royal Society of British Artists in 1862. She remained true to watercolour painting and was a member of various societies of watercolour artists, and in 1888, Martineau was elected an associate of the Royal Society of Painters in Water Colours.

Martineau exhibited her work at the Palace of Fine Arts at the 1893 World's Columbian Exposition in Chicago, Illinois.

Her 1888 painting Potato Harvest was included in the 1905 book Women Painters of the World.

Edith died in Hampstead, aged 66, and was buried in the Martineau family grave on the eastern side of Highgate Cemetery.
