= Violet Martineau =

Violet Isabel Martineau
- Born: September 4, 1865; Bengeo, Hertfordshire
- Died: January 9, 1948 (aged 82); Heckfield, Hampshire
- Occupations: Writer, editor, biographer

Violet Isabel Martineau (4 September 1865 – 9 January 1948) was an English writer, editor, and biographer.

== Personal life ==
Violet Isabel Martineau was the only daughter of the barrister and Justice of the peace John Martineau (1834–1910) of Walsham-le-Willows, Suffolk, and Louisa Amabel (d.1894), daughter of Henry John Adeane. The family knew Lewis Carroll (Charles Dodgson), whose home Violet visited.

She spent much of her life living in Hampshire, where she was Hon. Sec. of the Hants County Nursing Association, and Secretary of the Ladies' Committee of the Brabazon Employment Society.

Violet Martineau died on 9 January 1865, and was cremated on 14 January.

== Writing ==
In 1921, Martineau published a biography of her father, titled John Martineau: The Pupil of Kingsley.

Around 1934, she wrote a biography of her maternal aunt, Jane Henrietta Adeane, an administrator and philanthropist. In 1936, Martineau published the recollections of her cousin, the activist Sophia Lonsdale, of which the National Review wrote that:

her notes and careful arrangement of extracts give us a living picture of a woman who would inspire anybody, and strangers who never knew her might well, in turning these pages, wish ardently that that privilege had been theirs.

Punch called it "admirably edited".

== Bibliography ==
- John Martineau, the pupil of Kingsley (1921)
- Gertrude Martineau and Rothiemurchus (1925)
- Recollections of Sophia Lonsdale (1936)
