= John Gooch Robberds =

English Unitarian minister

John Gooch Robberds (1789–1854) was an English Unitarian minister in Manchester.

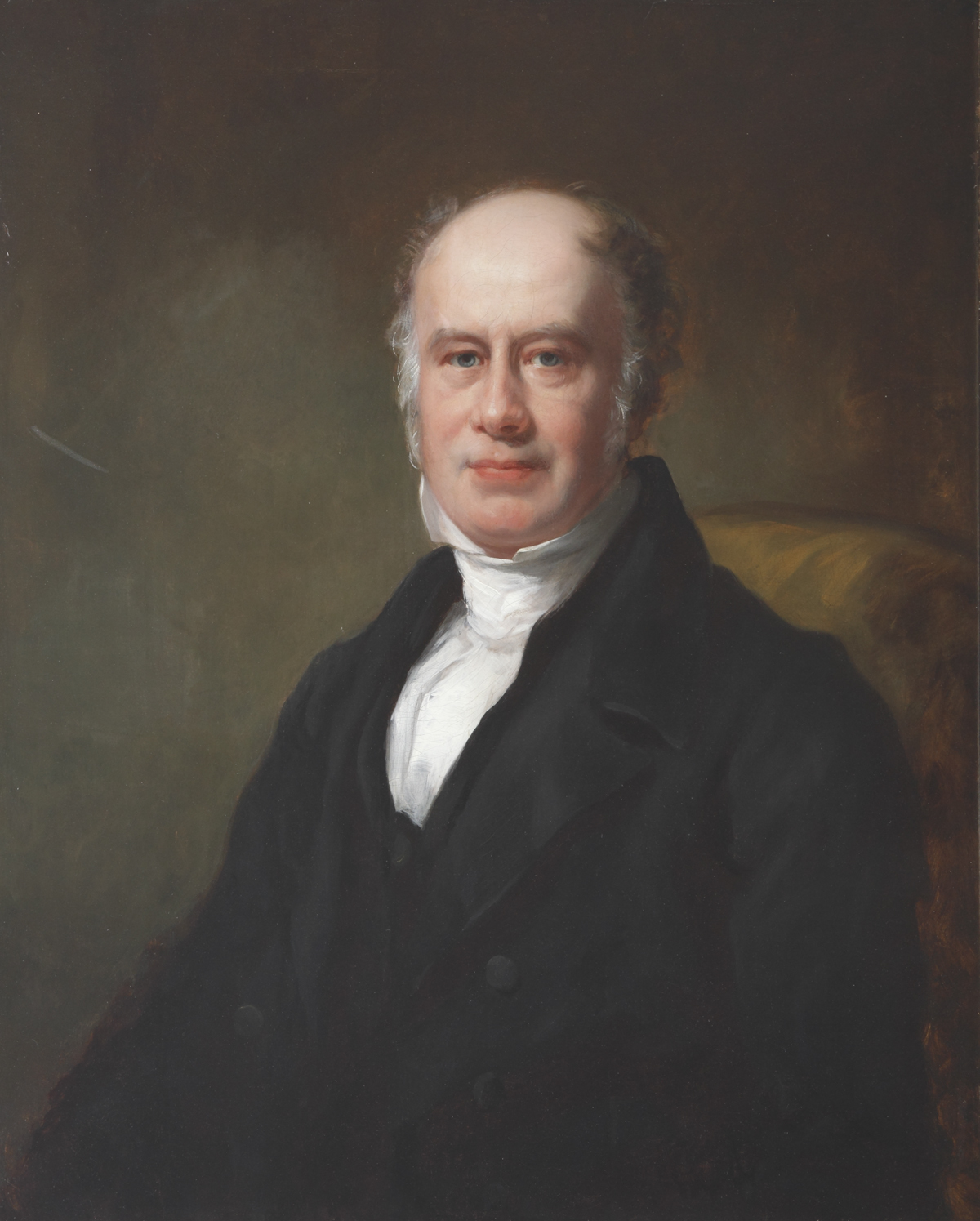
John Gooch Robberds

== Life ==
Robberds was born in Norwich on 18 May 1789; his mother, whose maiden name was Harrell, was from a Huguenot family. John Warden Robberds, the biographer of William Taylor of Norwich, was his second cousin. He was educated at Norwich grammar school.

In September 1805 Robberds entered Manchester College, then at York to study for the Unitarian ministry. His fellow student Joseph Hunter says that Robberds parried the tag De mortuis nil nisi bonum, as a plea for reverence to antiquity, by translating it "Of dead things nothing is left but bones".

In 1809 Robberds acted as assistant tutor in classics. He began to preach at Filby, Norfolk, during the summer vacation of 1809. Leaving York at midsummer 1810, he preached for a few months at the Octagon Chapel, Norwich, and was invited to settle there as colleague to Theophilus Browne; but on 19 December 1810 he was called to Cross Street Chapel, Manchester, in succession to Ralph Harrison, and as colleague to John Grundy.

Robberds began his ministry in Manchester in April 1811, where he remained for over 40 years. His colleagues were, from 1825, John Hugh Worthington (1804–1827), the betrothed of Harriet Martineau, and from 1828 William Gaskell. For some years Robberds kept a school. In Manchester College he held the offices of secretary (1814–22), and public examiner (1822–40); and on the return of the college from York to Manchester he filled the chairs of Hebrew and Syriac (1840–5) and pastoral theology (1840–52). His friend Edward Holme left him (1847) an estate in Westmorland.

Robberds was a conciliatory figure in his denomination. He died at 35 Acomb Street, Greenheys, Manchester, on 21 April 1854, and was buried on 26 April in the Rusholme Road cemetery; there was a brass to his memory in Cross Street chapel.

== Works ==
Robberds published sixteen single sermons (1820–1850), tracts and lectures, and a memorial Sketch prefixed to the posthumous Sermons (1825, 2 vols.) of Pendlebury Houghton (1758–1824). Posthumous was his Christian Festivals and Natural Seasons, a volume of sermons, with memoir, 1855.

== Family ==
Robberds married, on 31 December 1811, Mary (b. 24 February 1786; d. 10 January 1869), eldest daughter of William Turner of Newcastle upon Tyne. His eldest son was Charles William Robberds, who retired from the ministry in 1869; his second son was John Robberds (1814–92), minister from 1840 to 1866 of Toxteth Park chapel, Liverpool.

== Notes ==
Attribution

This article incorporates text from a publication now in the public domain: Lee, Sidney, ed. (1896). "Robberds, John Gooch". Dictionary of National Biography. Vol. 48. London: Smith, Elder & Co.
