= Susannah Taylor =

Wife of John Taylor, hymn writer (1755–1823)

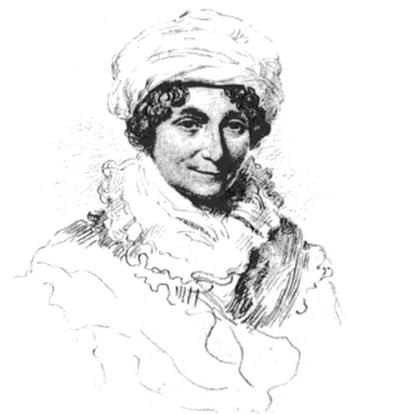
- Drawing by Henry Meyer
- Born: 29 March 1755; Norwich, England
- Died: June 1823 (aged 68)
- Spouse: John Taylor
- Children: 7, including John Taylor, Richard Taylor, Edward Taylor, Philip Taylor, Sarah Austin

Susannah Taylor or Susannah Cook (29 March 1755 – June, 1823) - also known by the sobriquet Madame Roland or Dame Roland - was a British socialite and correspondent.

== Life ==
Susannah was the daughter of John Cook and Aramathea Maria Phillips. She was born in Norwich in 1755.

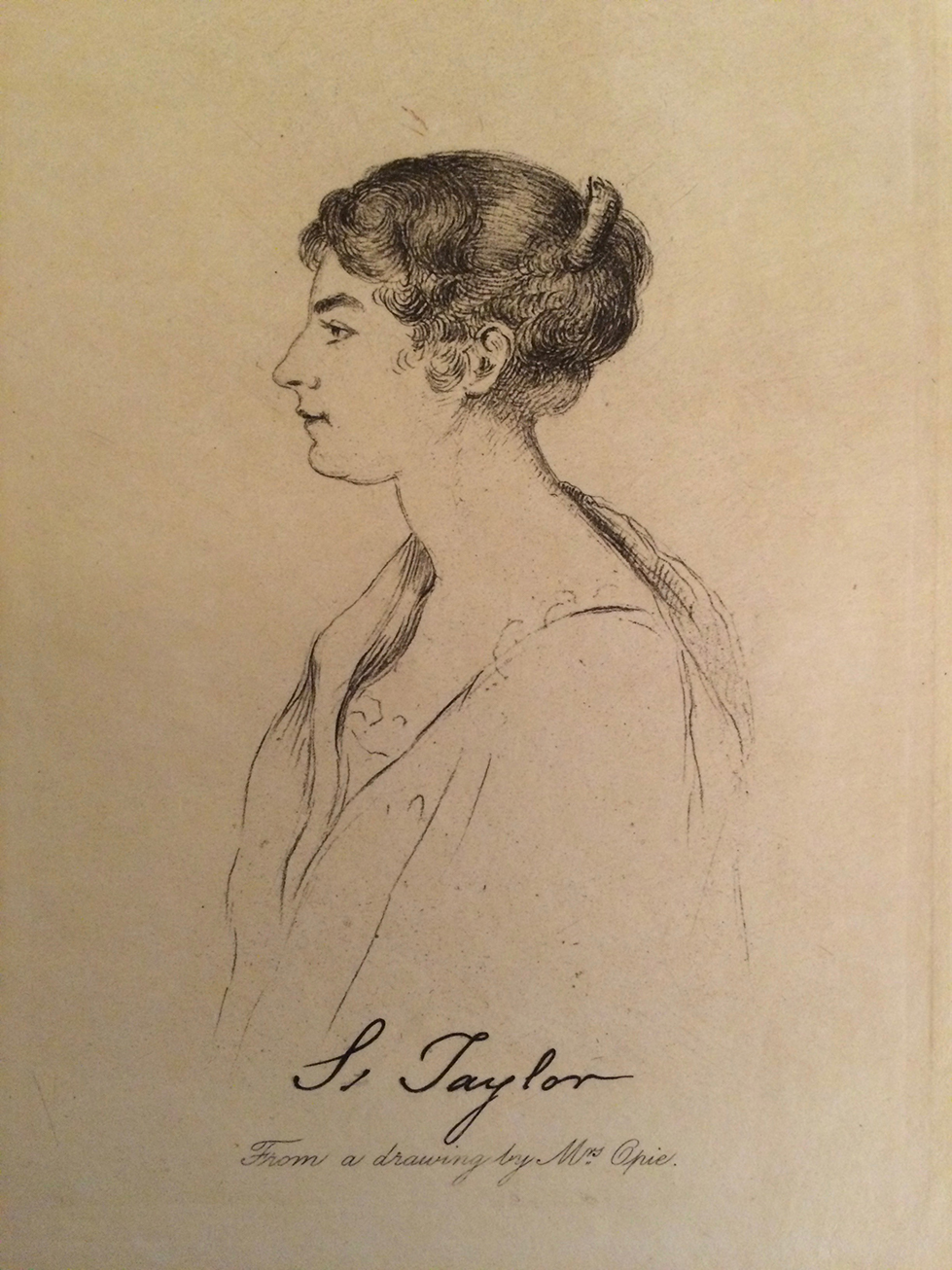
Susannah Taylor by Mrs Amelia Opie

In 1777 she married John Taylor (1750–1826) who was a wool merchant and hymn writer. Susannah was a Bluestocking with strong political (Whig) beliefs. Susannah and John's home was the place for gatherings which discussed radical politics. Guests included Sir James Edward Smith, the botanist, Henry Crabb Robinson, the barrister, Robert Southey, poet laureate, Cecilia Windham, wife of William Windham and Sir James Mackintosh. Thomas Coke, 1st Earl of Leicester and William Keppel, 4th Earl of Albemarle, both Whigs, are recorded as being entertained by Susannah in her drawing room after completing their routine farming business at the marketplace in Norwich. Mackintosh described the house as a "haven" with Susannah described as intelligent and knowledgeable. It was here that she met her friend and fellow Bluestocking, Anna Laetitia Barbauld, a close friend of Sarah Martineau who was the aunt of Susannah's husband, John. The Taylor and the Martineau families were important political allies.

Others guests at the house were William Enfield, and some early supporters of the French Revolution: Edward Rigby, Norwich physician James Alderson and his daughter Amelia. Susannah was said to have danced for joy when she heard of the storming of the Bastille. The soubriquets Dame or Madame Roland were used by Susannah's close friends when addressing her, as she was said to look like the French revolutionist.

John and Susannah raised seven children to be honest, to avoid debt, and to take control of their business dealings. Their children were John (1779–1863), Richard (1781–1858), Edward (1784–1863), Philip (1786–1870), Susan (born 1788), married Whig politician Henry Reeve, Arthur (born 1790), a printer and F.S.A., author of The Glory of Regality (London, 1820), and Papers in relation to the Antient Topography of the Eastern Counties (London, 1869), and Sarah, wife of John Austin, the jurist. Susannah was responsible for the education of her daughters.

Susannah died in June 1823 and there is a memorial to her and her husband inside the Octagon Chapel, Norwich.
