= Henry Reeve (physician) =

English physician

- Born: September 1780; Hadleigh, Suffolk
- Died: 27 September 1814 (aged 33–34)
- Occupation: Physician

Henry Reeve (September 1780 – 27 September 1814) was an English physician.

== Biography ==
Reeve was the second son of Abraham Reeve of Hadleigh, Suffolk, where he was born in September 1780. His mother was Elizabeth, eldest daughter of Dr. Wallace, rector of Messing in Essex. At sixteen he left Dedham school to study anatomy and surgery under Philip Meadows Martineau of Norwich, and removed in 1800 to the university of Edinburgh. There he attended the lectures of Dugald Stewart on moral philosophy, of John Robison on natural philosophy, of James Gregory on medicine, of Thomas Charles Hope on chemistry. He associated with Henry Brougham, Francis Horner, and Sydney Smith; was elected in November 1802 a member of the Speculative Society, of which they were the moving spirits; and contributed to early numbers of the ‘Edinburgh Review’ articles on ‘Population’ and on Pinel's ‘Treatment of the Insane.’ He was president of the Royal Medical Society in 1802–3, graduating M.D. in the latter year, for which occasion he wrote a thesis entitled ‘De Animalibus in hyeme sopitis.’

Removing to London to continue his studies, he frequented the house of Anna Laetitia Barbauld and Dr. John Aikin, formed a friendship with Sir Humphry Davy, met Sir Joseph Banks, Isaac D'Israeli, and Samuel Taylor Coleridge. In conjunction with Dr. Thomas Bateman, he founded, in 1805, the ‘Edinburgh Medical and Surgical Journal,’ to which he sent frequent communications. In 1805 he started on a foreign tour, spent some months at Neuchâtel, traversed Switzerland, and ventured, with an American passport, on French territory at Geneva. Reaching Vienna on 30 September, he was there an eye-witness of the scenes that followed Austerlitz (5 December), saw Napoleon at Schönbrunn, heard Girolamo Crescentini sing, had an interview with Joseph Haydn, and was present when Beethoven, ‘a small, dark, young-looking man,’ directed a performance of ‘Fidelio.’ At Berlin, moreover, in the spring of 1806, he became acquainted with Martin Heinrich Klaproth and Alexander von Humboldt, and was among the auditors of Johann Gottlieb Fichte.

Shortly after his return to England he settled at Norwich, and pursued his profession with energy and success. He was admitted, on 12 February 1807, an extra-licentiate of the College of Physicians, and was elected physician to the Norfolk and Norwich Hospital, and to the lunatic asylum. But an obscure disease cut short his promising career. He died at his father's house at Hadleigh on 27 September 1814, aged 34. A tablet inscribed to his memory was placed by his widow in the Octagon Chapel at Norwich. A paper by him on ‘Cretinism’ was read before the Royal Society on 11 February 1808 (Phil. Trans. xcviii. 111), and he published at London in 1809 an essay ‘On the Torpidity of Animals.’ His ‘Journal of a Residence at Vienna and Berlin in the eventful Winter 1805–6’ was published by his son in 1877. The journal of his preceding Swiss tour remains in manuscript.

He married, in 1807, Susan, eldest daughter of John Taylor of Norwich, one of that family by whom, according to the Duke of Sussex, the saying was invented that ‘it takes nine tailors to make a man.’ Mrs. Reeve was a sister of Sarah Austin, and died in 1864, having survived her husband fifty years. Of his three children two died in infancy; the third, Henry, is separately noticed.
