= William Taylor (man of letters) =

British essayist, scholar and polyglot

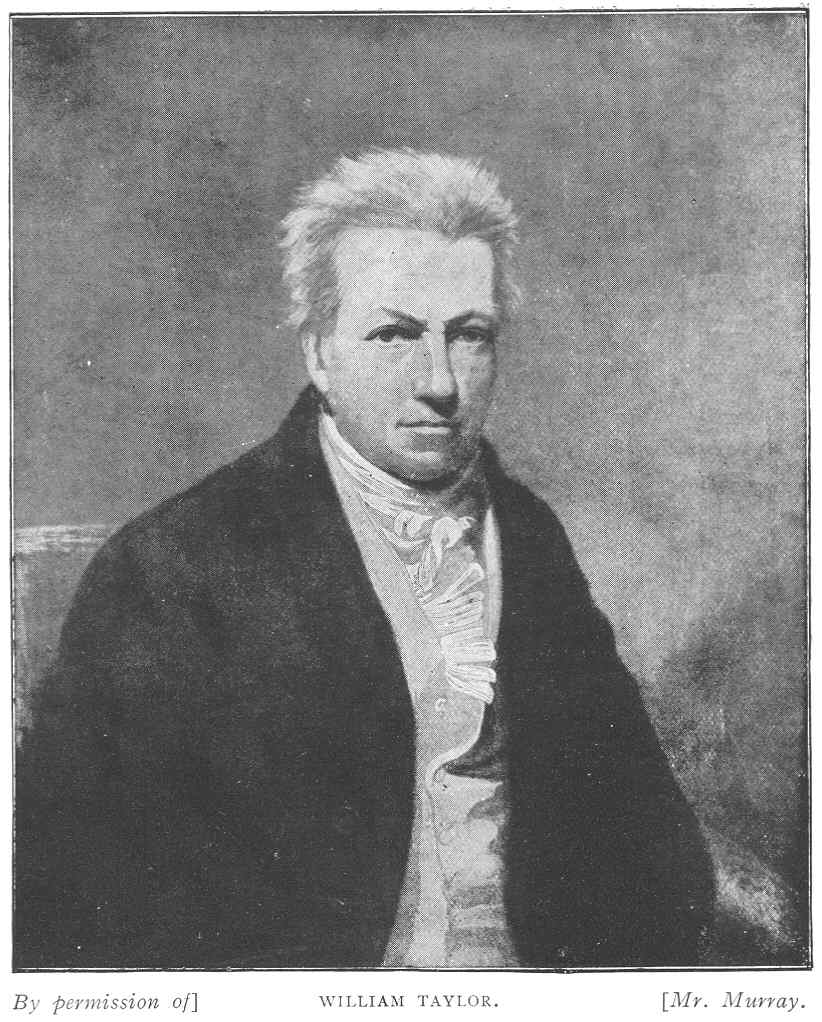
- Born: 7 November 1765; Norwich, East Anglia, England
- Died: 5 March 1836 (aged 70); Norwich, East Anglia, England

William Taylor (7 November 1765 – 5 March 1836), often called William Taylor of Norwich, was a British essayist, scholar and polyglot. He is most notable as a supporter and translator of German romantic literature.

== Early life ==
He was born in Norwich, Norfolk, England on 7 November 1765, the only child of William Taylor (died 1819), a wealthy Norwich merchant with European trade connections, by his wife Sarah (died 1811), second daughter of John Wright of Diss, Norfolk. William Taylor was taught Latin, French and Dutch by John Bruckner, pastor of the French and Dutch Protestant churches in Norwich, in preparation for continuing his father's continental trading in textiles. In 1774 he was transferred to Palgrave Academy, Suffolk, by Rochemont Barbauld, whose wife Anna Letitia Barbauld Taylor regarded as a strong influence. For three years his school companion was Frank Sayers, who was to be a lifelong friend.

In August 1779 his father took him from school. During the next three years he spent much of his time abroad. Firstly he visited the Netherlands, France, and Italy, learning languages and business methods. In 1781, he left home again, and spent a year in Detmold, staying with an Alsatian Protestant pastor called Roederer, and absorbing German literature under the influence of Lorenz Benzler. Roederer gave him introductions to August Ludwig von Schlözer the historian at Göttingen, and to Goethe at Weimar. After further German travels he returned to Norwich on 17 November 1782.

== Intellectual and political radical ==
Taylor was a Unitarian who attended the Octagon Chapel, Norwich. He became the leading figure of Norwich's literary circles, and a political radical. He applauded the French Revolution and argued for universal suffrage and the end of all governmental intervention in the affairs of religion. He wrote in the 18th century tradition of liberal and latitudinarian criticism of the Bible (which Sayers thought heretical, at least in part). In the period 1793 to 1799 he wrote over 200 reviews in periodicals, following his concept of "philosophical criticism".

From 1783 Taylor was engaged in his father's business. In May and June 1784 he was in Scotland with Sayers, who had begun medical studies at Edinburgh; there he met James Mackintosh. A second journey to Edinburgh in 1788 followed a breakdown in Sayers' health.

In November 1789 Taylor's father was made secretary of a Revolution Society in Norwich, formed to commemorate the Glorious Revolution of 1688. In May 1790 Taylor made a visit to France, and spent time at the National Assembly. He returned somewhat sceptical whether its members' rhetoric matched their intentions, but translated a number of its decrees for the Revolution Society. Before the end of 1790 two new clubs were formed in Norwich, of which Taylor became a member, the "Tusculan School" for political discussion, and the Speculative Society, founded by William Enfield for philosophical debate. Taylor became a leader of the Speculative Club. It lasted to 1797, dissolving after Enfield died.

Around this point in time, Taylor persuaded his father to retire on his fortune. The firm was dissolved in 1791; his father employed part of his capital in underwriting, not very successfully. Taylor resisted his father's wish to put him into a London bank. William Taylor senior gave up his position as secretary to the Revolution Society by early 1792. In May 1794 government repression of radicals meant the Norwich Revolution Society closed down officially; and Taylor added "junior" to its written records, wherever his father's name appeared.

In late 1794 a Norwich periodical, The Cabinet, was set up, publishing articles taking an anti-government view. It was supposed to be the work of a "Society of Gentlemen", the group behind it being closely related to the Tusculan School, which dissolved or went underground in mid-1794: it was edited by Charles Marsh, and Taylor contributed, along with other like-minded young radicals, such as Thomas Starling Norgate and Amelia Alderson. They had tacit support from older citizens, including Enfield and Edward Rigby. It appeared for a year from September 1794, proposing in fact a tame and moderate intellectual line.

== Reputation ==
Taylor was nicknamed godless Billy for his radical views by Harriet Martineau. Martineau, born in 1802, was a child when Taylor was in his intellectual prime. Thirty-three years junior to Taylor, she petulantly said of him:

his habits of intemperance kept him out of the sight of ladies, and he got round him a set of ignorant and conceited young men, who thought they could set the whole world right by their destructive propensities.

David Chandler writes in the Oxford Dictionary of National Biography that Taylor was probably homosexual.

== Later life ==
Taylor's friendship with Robert Southey began early in 1798, when Southey, having placed his brother Henry Herbert Southey with George Burnett at Great Yarmouth, visited Norwich as Taylor's guest; Southey revisited him at Norwich in February 1802. Much of their correspondence to 1821 is given by John Warden Robberds in his Memoir of Taylor; it is frank on both sides.

In 1802, during the Peace of Amiens, Taylor embarked on another tour of Europe, visiting France, Italy and Germany, partly on business; Henry Southey joined him at Paris. He stayed with Lafayette at Lagrange, where he met Frances d'Arblay. In Paris he met Thomas Holcroft, Thomas Paine, and Thomas Manning.

From 1811 American and other business losses made money tight. Taylor applied in 1812, at Southey's suggestion, for the post of keeper of manuscripts in the British Museum, on the resignation of Francis Douce; but the vacancy was already filled.

Unmarried, Taylor lived with his parents. He had a daily routine of studying in the morning, walking in the afternoon followed by bathing in the River Wensum, from a bath house upstream from the city and its pollution. In the evening he liked to socialise, drink (heavily) and discuss linguistics, literature and philosophy in society.

== Works ==
Three early poetic translations from German brought him to notice. Georg Herzfeld wrongly assigned to him the political song, The Trumpet of Liberty, first published in the Norfolk Chronicle on 16 July 1791, having been sung on 14 July at a dinner commemorating the fall of the Bastille; Edward Taylor claimed it for his father, John Taylor, of the unrelated Norwich family. William Taylor's name was made by his translation of Gottfried August Bürger's Lenore into English ballad metre. This was written in 1790, and bore the title Lenora; sent it to his friend Benzler from Detmold (then in Wernigerode); a previous version had been made in 1782 by Henry James Pye, but was not published till 1795, and was unknown to Taylor. The translation, circulated in manuscript, was made the foundation of a ballad (1791) by John Aikin, and was read by Anna Barbauld in 1794 at a literary gathering in the house of Dugald Stewart in Edinburgh. Stewart's brother-in-law, George Cranstoun (Lord Corehouse) gave his recollection of it to Walter Scott, who produced his own version (1796) of the poem, entitled William and Helen. The announcement of the almost simultaneous publication of Scott's version and three others had led Taylor to publish his in the Monthly Magazine in March 1796; he then published it separately as Ellenore, revised with some input from the version by William Robert Spencer.

To 1790 belong also his translations of Gotthold Ephraim Lessing's Nathan the Wise and Goethe's Iphigenia in Tauris. The former was first published in 1805. The Iphigenia was submitted to Benzler before September 1790, but was not printed till 1793 (for private distribution); and published 1794. In 1795 Taylor sent a copy to Goethe, through Benzler. A volume of Christoph Martin Wieland's Dialogues of the Gods (1795) contained four dialogues; five more dialogues were included in his Historic Survey (1828–30).

Taylor's career as a prolific literary critic began in April 1793 with an article in the Monthly Review on his friend Frank Sayers's Disquisitions. To this review (with a break, 1800–1809) he contributed till 1824; to the Monthly Magazine from its start till 1824; to the Annual Review from 1802 to 1807; to the Critical Review, 1803–4 and 1809; to the Athenæum, 1807–8, making a total of 1754 articles. He wrote also for the Cambridge Intelligencer, conducted by Benjamin Flower, from 20 July 1793 to 18 June 1803, and was concerned in two short-lived Norwich magazines, the Cabinet (October 1794–5), issued in conjunction with Sayers, and the Iris (5 February 1803 – 29 January 1804), to which Robert Southey was a contributor. To the Foreign Quarterly (1827) he contributed one article. His friends teased him on the peculiarities of his diction, which James Mackintosh styled the Taylorian language: he coined words such as "transversion", "body-spirit", and "Sternholdianism". Some of his terms, ruled out by the editor of the Monthly Review as "not English", have since become accepted—for instance, "rehabilitated". He forecast steam navigation (1804); advised the formation of colonies in Africa (1805); and projected the Panama Canal (1824).

Taylor suggested to Southey the publication of an annual collection of verse, on the plan of the Almanach des Muses, and contributed to both volumes of this Annual Anthology (1799–1800), using the signatures "Ryalto" (an anagram) and "R. O." To the second volume he contributed specimens of English hexameters, which he had first attempted in the Monthly Magazine, 1796. As editor of A Voyage to the Demerary (1807) by Henry Bolingbroke, he expressed himself in favour of a regulated slave trade.

His family financial affairs were not prospering, and he wrote more for money. His Tales of Yore (1810, 3 vols., anonymously), was a collection of prose translations from French and German, begun in 1807. On the basis of his magazine articles he issued his English Synonyms Described (1813) a work from which his old schoolfellow George Crabb borrowed much (1824) without specific acknowledgment; it was reissued in 1850 and subsequently; a German translation appeared in 1851. In 1823 he edited the works of his friend Sayers, prefixing an elaborate biography.

His major work, the Historic Survey of German Poetry (1828–30, 3 vols.) was behind the times. It is a patchwork of previous articles and translations, with digressions. His last publication was a Memoir (1831) of Philip Meadows Martineau, a Norwich surgeon, written in conjunction with F. Elwes.

== Influence ==
William Taylor was England's first advocate of and enthusiast for German Romantic literature, and leader in its assimilation until the return of Coleridge from Germany in 1799. English writers were indebted to his enthusiastic if free translations. In 1828 the author Thomas Carlyle reminded Goethe that:

A Mr.Taylor of Norwich who is at present publishing Specimens of German Poetry, is a man of learning and long ago gave a version of your Iphigenie auf Tauris ('Iphigenia in Tauris')

Taylor is depicted as a mentor in George Borrow's semi-autobiographical novel Lavengro. Borrow described his philological teacher as:

the Anglo-German... a real character, the founder of the Anglo-German school in England, and the cleverest Englishman who ever talked or wrote encomiastic nonsense about Germany and the Germans. (Romany Rye)
