= Philip Taylor (civil engineer) =

English civil engineer

Philip Taylor (1786–1870) was an English civil engineer. A significant innovator of the 1820s in steam engine design, he moved abroad to become an industrial leader in France and Italy (Kingdom of Sardinia).

== Early life ==
He was the fourth son of John and Susannah Taylor of Norwich; and the brother of Richard Taylor, Edward Taylor, John Taylor and Sarah Austin. He was educated at Dr. Houghton's school in Norwich.

Between 1801 and 1805 Taylor was with his brother John, who was employed by a copper mine in western Devon, for the Martineau family of Norwich. They came to know the Cornish engineer Arthur Woolf, though in Philip's case this was at a later point. Taylor had been sent to study surgery under Dr. Harness at Tavistock; but this apprenticeship did not result in a career. He returned to Norwich, where he joined a Mr. Chambers as a druggist; and worked with Dr. Fitch in a pharmacy business. He set up a factory to make wooden pillboxes, turning the first specimens on a small lathe powered by a pet spit-dog.

== In business in London ==
In 1812 Taylor moved to the neighbourhood of London, as a partner in the chemical works of his brother John at Stratford. Initially Philip was concerned with pharmaceuticals and apparatus, while John worked on metallurgical chemistry. They were backed by the Martineau family. One joint invention was an "acetometer", used to check excise duty on vinegar. Philip Taylor resided in the adjoining parish of Bromley. He went into business with John Martineau the younger, as Taylor & Martineau of City Road. The partnership was dissolved in 1827.

The City Road business of Taylor & Martineau was a foundry and engineering works. It produced steam engines, gas generators, and pumps. The elder John Martineau was involved in the business, at least financially.

=== Oil-gas lighting ===
John Taylor took out a patent in 1815 for decomposing animal oils into gas. This discovery led in 1823 to what Philip Taylor's son later wrote of as "the battle of the gases": the commercial contest between gas lighting derived from coal and from oils. About 20% of new gas undertakings of the 1820s were based on oil.

Philip Taylor invented a method of lighting public and private buildings by oil-gas, in connection with which he took out a patent on 15 June 1824 for an apparatus for producing gas from various substances (No. 4975). The Bow Gas Company obtained an act of parliament in 1821, when the main proprietors were John, Philip and Edward Taylor along with Thomas Martineau. The firm had run into questionable financial circumstances by 1823. Moses Ricardo, brother of David Ricardo, was involved in the oil-gas company as director; he also wrote as a publicist for oil-gas. In 1822 Taylor went to Paris in the hope of introducing oil-gas, but found that coal-gas had forestalled it.

Oil-gas enjoyed an advantage in whaling ports, where it could be based on whale oil. Sir Walter Scott was an early adopter, for Abbotsford, and became one of the Edinburgh promoters of Taylor & Martineau, where James Milne was their agent. The company had a technological edge, with their manager Tait inventing the telescopic gas holder. John Frederick Daniell discovered a definitive process for oil-gas production, which Taylor & Martineau implemented.

Taylor was in Dublin in 1825, setting up an oil-gas system. Covent Garden Theatre was won from coal-gas, but there were explosions. In the end, and internationally, economic forces meant that oil-gas lost ground to the cheaper coal-gas, and were not overcome by promotion or technically. It continued in use in New York till 1828.

=== Steam engines ===
From 1816 Taylor was involved in steam engine design. He testified in 1817 before a House of Commons select committee on steam navigation, and during his evidence said he did not know Arthur Woolf personally. At this time he was described as a "manufacturing" or "operative" chemist. His interest in steam came via high-pressure boilers, as reported in 1823 by Peter Ewart.

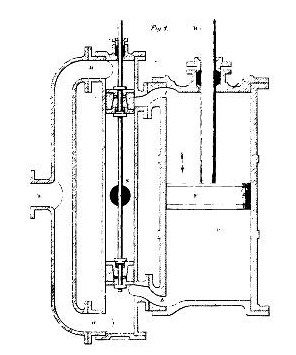
Taylor & Martineau piston arrangement, diagram from Thomas Tredgold, The Steam Engine: Comprising an Account of Its Invention and Progressive Improvement (1827)

On 25 May 1816 and 15 January 1818 Taylor had obtained patents for applying high-pressure steam in evaporating processes (Nos. 4032, 4197). On 3 July 1824 he took out a patent for a horizontal steam engine (No. 4983). In 1825 Taylor & Martineau was producing a standard factory stationary steam engine, of a type that would become common. Later they sold a boiler and steam engine to Marc Seguin, French rail pioneer, then working for a steamer company on the Rhône River. Harvey of Hayle produced engines to Taylor's design for Arthur Woolf.

=== Other interests ===
Taylor assisted Marc Isambard Brunel in 1821 in his financial difficulties, and was a director of the Thames Tunnel Company, though he resigned from its board in April 1825. In 1825 he became connected with the British Iron Company and took out a patent for making iron (No. 5244). He also innovated in the fields of steam applied in sugar manufacture, brewing, and in the Hawes Soap Works.

== In France ==
Involved in the financial troubles of the British Iron Company, Taylor went in 1828 to Paris, founded engineering works, and patented the hot blast process in the manufacture of iron. James Beaumont Neilson and Charles Macintosh simultaneously patented it in London; the validity of the Paris patent was disputed, and was not established till 1832, just before its expiration. Taylor introduced the hot blast in works at Vienne and Voulte-sur-Rhône.

In 1834 Taylor submitted to Louis-Philippe a scheme for supplying Paris with water by a tunnel from the River Marne to a hill at Ivry. He had previously proposed for London a nine-mile tunnel to Hampstead Hill; but nothing came of it. In 1834 he erected machinery for a flour-mill at Marseille, and became a partner in the business. Under protectionist pressure, it was soon deprived of the privilege of grinding in bond. Taylor's introduction of filtration in sugar refining improved the local product.

Taylor then, with his sons Philip Meadows and Robert, founded engineering works in Marseille, at Menpenti in 1835. In 1845 he bought a shipbuilding yard at La Seyne, near Toulon, which became a successful concern. In 1846 he went into partnership with the Marseille ironmaster Amédée Armand, thus putting together an industrial empire with all the components for the manufacture of steam vessels. Taylor's recruitment of British engineers and foremen proved to be significant in the transfer of new technology to the Mediterranean countries. Among his employees were William Adams, Fleeming Jenkin and Robert Whitehead.

== Later years ==
From 1847 to 1852 Taylor resided at San Pier d'Arena, near Genoa, where the Sardinian government had invited him to establish works. This venture, Taylor & Prandi, was set up with Fortunato Prandi. Political troubles, with slack demand, led Taylor to return to Marseille.

In bad health, Taylor disposed of his business, the Compagnie des Forges et Chantiers de la Méditerranée, in 1855 to a new consortium. He died at Sainte-Marguerite, near Marseille, on 1 July 1870. He was a member of the French Legion of Honour and the Sardinian Order of SS. Maurice and Lazarus.

== Associations ==
Taylor's circle included John Loudon McAdam, James Nasmyth, David Ricardo, Henry Maudslay, Robert Stephenson, Michael Faraday, Charles MacIntosh, Brunel, Francis John Hyde Wollaston, George Rennie, and Charles Wheatstone; also Humboldt, Gay-Lussac, Arago, and Jean-Baptiste Say. He prided himself on having taken part in the first steamboat trip at sea, on having seen the start of the first steam-engine, and on having witnessed at Somerset House Wheatstone's first electric telegraph experiments. He contributed in 1819 to the Quarterly Journal of Science, and in 1822 to the Philosophical Magazine.

== Family ==
In 1813 Taylor married Sarah, daughter of Robert Fitch, surgeon, of Ipswich. He had eight children.
