= John Taylor (mining engineer) =

British civil engineer and mining engineer (1779–1863)

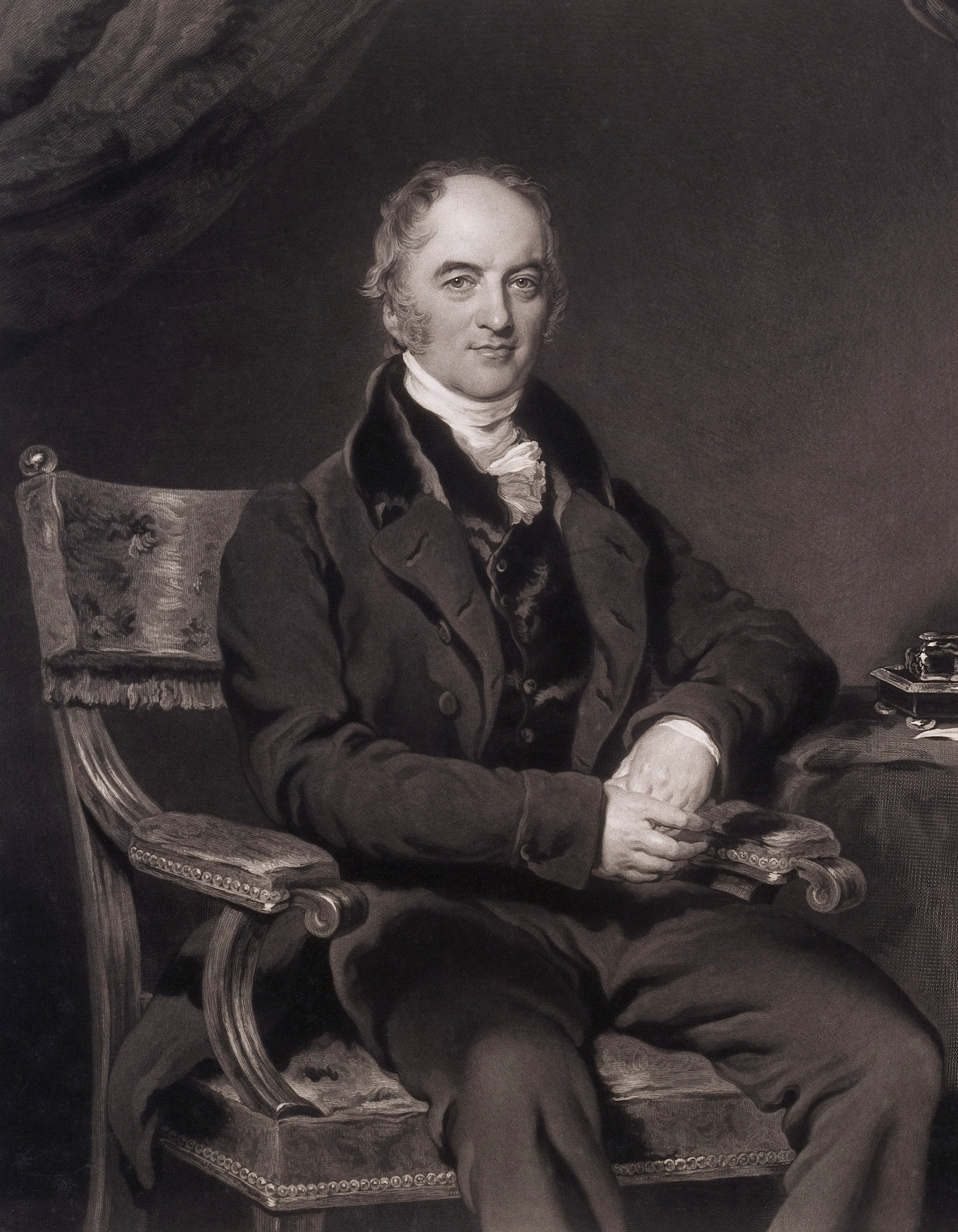
- Born: 22 August 1779; Norwich, England
- Died: 5 April 1863 (aged 83); London, England
- Occupation: Engineer
- Relatives: John Taylor (father), Susannah Taylor (mother), Philip Taylor (brother), Richard Taylor (brother), Edward Taylor (brother), Sarah Austin (sister), Daniel Pring (brother-in-law)

John Taylor (22 August 1779, in Norwich – 5 April 1863, in London) was a British mining engineer and entrepreneur. During his lifetime, which coincided with the Industrial Revolution, Taylor was responsible for transforming the traditional practices of British mining in to a scientific discipline through his many projects and publications.

== Life ==
Taylor was the son of John and Susannah Taylor. He was the brother of Philip Taylor.

=== Business interests ===
Many of Taylor's business interests were backed by the Martineau family. In 1796 he improvised a mechanised copper ore crusher at Wheal Friendship, a mine just outside Tavistock, Devon. This machine was improved over time and became widely adopted; it was known as the "Cornish rolls". Two years later, in 1798, when he was only 19 years old, he became the manager of this mine. Taylor's sons and Peter Finch Martineau's son and grandson were still active in its operations and oversight nearly a century later.

From 1803 to 1817 Taylor oversaw the construction of the Tavistock Canal, which linked the town of Tavistock to Morwellham Quay on the River Tamar, where cargo was loaded into ships.

In 1812 Taylor set up as a chemical manufacturer at Stratford, Essex. This enterprise, also funded by the Martineaus, set out to produce vitriol, but as Taylor & Martineau became widely diversified. One of Taylor's interests was sugar refining, for which he took out a patent in 1815 for a pressure method for separation of sugar from molasses. The use of heated animal oils in sugar processes disclosed the production of naphtha. Taylor took out another patent in 1815, for decomposing animal oils into gas. This discovery led Taylor & Martineau into 1823 to what Philip Taylor's son later wrote of as "the battle of the gases": the commercial contest between gas lighting derived from coal and from oils. John Taylor's direction in the 1820s, however, was back into mining.

In 1819 Taylor raised the £65,000 needed to re-open the Consolidated Mines in Gwennap, Cornwall. This mine employed over 3,000 people and became the most productive in Cornwall, yielding almost 450,000 tons of copper ore. He was also mineral agent to the Duke of Devonshire and to the commissioners of Greenwich Hospital.

In 1824 he built the Redruth and Chasewater Railway to transport the ore from Consolidated Mines and others nearby to the port at Devoran.

In 1824 he also began a major expansion of the copper mines at Coniston in Cumbria, making them "the largest and most profitable copper mines in the north".

In 1836 he erected a new engine at Penrhyn Du and held a lease from 1838

=== Intellectual life ===
In 1807 Taylor was elected a Fellow of the Geological Society, and acted as treasurer from 1816 to 1844. In 1825 he was elected a Fellow of the Royal Society, and was one of the founders of the British Association on 26 June 1832, holding the office of treasurer till September 1861. He was one of the founders of University College London, to which he acted as treasurer for many years.

== Works ==
Taylor was the author of Statements concerning the Profits of Mining in England (London, 1825), edited Records of Mining in 1829, and contributed articles to scientific journals. A list of his publications may be found in the appendix of R. Burt, John Taylor, mining entrepreneur and engineer, 1779–1863, Moorland Publishing Company, 1977. He contributed articles on mining to Rees's Cyclopædia.

=== Bibliography ===
Burt (1977) collects Taylor's bibliography:

1. Taylor, John (1799). "Sketch of the history of mining in Devon and Cornwall". Philosophical Magazine. 5: 357–365.
2. Taylor, John (1803). "Sketch of the general history of mining". Philosophical Magazine. 15: 164–167.
3. Taylor, John (1808). "On blasting rocks and tamping". Philosophical Magazine. 30: 97–101.
4. Taylor, John (1810). "Account of the construction of a machine for conveying fresh air underground". Transactions of the Society of arts. 26.
5. Taylor, John (1811). "Communication on Water Pressure Engines". Philosophical Magazine. 37: 129–131.
6. Taylor, John (1811). "Method of ventilating mines or hospitals by extracting foul air from them". Philosophical Magazine. 38: 120–127.
7. Taylor, John (1811). "Remarks on the present state of the county of Devon, introductory to the new edition to Risdon's survey". The Chronographical Description or Survey of the County of Devon. T. Risdon. pp. i–xxxvi.
8. Taylor, John (1814). "On the ventilation of coal mines". Ann. Phil. 3: 196–202.
9. Taylor, John (1814). "On the economy of the mines of Cornwall and Devon". Transactions of the Geological Society. 12: 309–327.
10. Taylor, John (1817). "Description of the tunnel of the Tavistock Canal, through Morwel Down, in the county of Devon". Transactions of the Geological Society. 4: 146–155.
11. Taylor, John (1817). "On some remarkable appearances in coke". Transactions of the Geological Society. 4: 448–449.
12. Taylor, John (1818). "On the construction of fire places in boilers". Ann. Phil. 12: 51–52.
13. Taylor, John (6 November 1821). "Letter to the Editor on the subject of colliery accidents". The Times.
14. Taylor, John (1821). "On the smelting of tin ores in Cornwall and Devonshire". Transactions of the Geological Society. 5: 358–368.
15. Taylor, John (1822). "Observations on Mr Schoolcraft's "Account of the native copper on the southern shore of Lake Superior, with historical citations and miscellaneous remarks"". Ann. Phil. New Series. 3: 56–59.
16. Taylor, John (1823). "A course of lectures on metallurgy delivered at the London Institution". Philosophical Magazine. 61: 283–291, 368–374, 448–458.
17. Taylor, John (1824). Selections from the works of the Baron de Humboldt, Relating to the Climate, Inhabitants, productions and Mines of Mexico.
18. Taylor, John (1817). "On some remarkable appearances in coke". Transactions of the Geological Society. 4: 448–449.
19. Taylor, John (1824). "Notice respecting a copper mine at Cally in Kircudbrightshire". Transactions of the Geological Society. 2nd Series. 1: 164–165.
20. Taylor, John (22 November 1824). "Letter on the Mexican mines". The Times: 3.
21. Taylor, John (1825). Statements Respecting the Profits of Mining in England Considered in Relation to the Prospects of Mining in Mexico.
22. Taylor, John (1825). "Prospectus of a School of Mines in Cornwall". Philosophical Magazine. 66: 137–150.
23. Taylor, John (1827). "On the accidents incident to steam boilers". Philosophical Magazine. 2nd Series. 1: 126–133.
24. Taylor, John (1827). "On rain gauges". Philosophical Magazine. 2nd Series. 2: 406–408.
25. Taylor, John (1829). Records of Mining.
26. Taylor, John (1829). "Improvements in the management of mines". Philosophical Magazine. 2nd Series. 6: 383–392.
27. Taylor, John (1830). "On the duty of steam engines in Cornwall". Philosophical Magazine. 2nd Series. 7: 424–431.
28. Taylor, John (1831). "On the collection and arrangement of veinstones and the importance of an accurate examination of their connection with the rocks in which they occur". Reports and Transactions of the British Association. 1: 578–580.
29. Taylor, John (1831). "Notices of some improvements in dressing ores". Quarterly Mining Review. 2: 82–87.

== Family ==
Taylor in 1805 married Ann Pring, sister to Daniel Pring. They began a family at Holwell House, Whitchurch, Devon. His son, also John, was born there in 1808, and followed his father into the mining business. In 1845 father and son formed a partnership, John Taylor & Son. This partnership had an extensive portfolio of lead mines, copper mines and collieries, both in the UK and in Canada, Spain, Portugal, Central America, Western Africa and the Cape of Good Hope.

In 1829, Taylor and his family played host to composer Felix Mendelssohn at their country home in Wales. While there, Mendelssohn composed several works, including his operetta Son and Stranger for his parents' silver wedding anniversary, an organ work for his sister's wedding, and three piano fantasias written as gifts for Taylor's daughters.
