= John Martineau =

English sugar refiner and engineer (1789 – 1832)

John Martineau the younger
- Born: 1789; England
- Died: January 6, 1832 (aged 42–43); On board ship, Atlantic ocean
- Occupation(s): Civil engineer, sugar refiner
- Known for: Involvement in the chemical firm Taylor & Martineau
- Spouse: Jane Taylor
- Children: 7, including Jane Martineau

John Martineau the younger (1789 – 6 January 1832) was an English sugar refiner and engineer, best known for his involvement in the firm Taylor & Martineau.

== Early life ==
Martineau was born in 1789 in England. He was the third son of John Martineau, the elder, of Stamford Hill.

== Career ==
In 1815 he took out a patent with his cousin Peter Martineau (son of Peter Finch Martineau) for a new means of decolourising sugar during refining. Through the mining interests of the Martineau family, he came into contact with his cousins John Taylor and Philip Taylor, who became business partners. At that point the Taylors were running a chemical business, backed by Martineau money. Under the influence of the Martineaus, the Taylors introduced a high-pressure boiler manufactured by John Braithwaite the younger.

Martineau became a member of the Institution of Civil Engineers in 1821. After the business of Taylor & Martineau fell away, he in 1827 went into steel manufacture, with Johann Conrad Fischer and Richard Carter Smith. He had an earlier patent on a steel process.

=== London Mechanics' Institution ===
Martineau was closely associated with George Birkbeck and the London Mechanics' Institution. He attended the meeting in early November 1823 at the Crown and Anchor off the Strand, attended by about 50 people, representing with Bryan Donkin and Alexander Galloway employers with an interest in technical training of their staff. He was a member of the Provisional Committee of 15, with Richard Taylor, brother of Philip. After the mass meeting at the Crown and Anchor on 11 November, there followed a tense and confrontational meeting of 22 November at which the question of subscriptions to the Institution was debated. Joseph Clinton Robertson and Thomas Hodgskin argued the case for rejecting outside subscription, on the grounds that the autonomy of the mechanics to run their own affairs would be limited by accepting the money. They were supported by the architect Robert McWilliam. Martineau and Taylor sided with Birkbeck and Francis Place, in backing the subscription scheme brought forward by William Bayley, which was carried.

Martineau led the poll for vice-president in the election of 15 December 1823, with the other three vice-presidents being McWilliam, John Millington and John Borthwick Gilchrist. He was present at the laying of the foundation stone of the Institution in 1824. With Galloway, Timothy Bramah and Henry Maudslay, Martineau also testified to Joseph Hume's parliamentary committee on artisans and technology, in the period 1824–5 when a commercial depression was looming.

== Death ==
With his family, John Martineau planned an emigration to the United States. After his death in 1832 on board ship, they had to return to London.

== Family ==
Family connections were particularly significant in the life of John Martineau, a phenomenon that has been remarked on for Dissenter families, such as his. He married Jane Taylor, daughter of Samuel Taylor of New Buckenham and sister of Richard Cowling Taylor, and a second cousin. The family alliance of Martineaus and Taylors went back to the marriages of Richard Taylor (1719–1762), son of John Taylor and father of Samuel Taylor, to Margaret Meadows (1718–1781), and David Martineau II (father of John Martineau the elder) to Sarah Meadows, who were sisters.

John and Jane Martineau had a numerous family, including Jane Martineau (1812–1882), known as an academic administrator.
