= Clara Martineau =

English councillor and social activist

Clara Martineau J.P.
- Born: 1874; Birmingham, England
- Died: January 29, 1932 (aged 57–58)
- Monuments: Martineau House
- Occupations: Councillor and social activist
- Known for: Being the third woman councillor on Birmingham City Council.
- Family: Martineau family

Clara Martineau (1874 – 29 January 1932) was an English councillor and social activist. She was the third woman to serve as a councillor on the Birmingham City Council, representing Edgbaston for 19 years.

== Personal life ==
Clara Martineau was born in 1874, the daughter of solicitor Sir Thomas Martineau and Emily Kenrick. Thomas Martineau served on Birmingham's Town Council 1876–1893, and was mayor 1884–1887. He received a knighthood in 1887. Clara was privately educated.

Between 1908 and 1909 Martineau acted as Lady Mayoress for her uncle, Sir George Kenrick. She was active in the Unitarian Old Meeting Church, Birmingham. There, she was the first woman churchwarden, and occasionally conducted services.

== Charitable and political work ==
Martineau worked for a number of years at the Birmingham Settlement, gaining practical experience of the needs of the poor. She also worked with the Birmingham Charity Organisation Society and the City Aid Society.

During the First World War, Martineau worked actively as part of the Citizens Committee, supporting the dependents of soldiers and sailors.

In 1913 Martineau became the third woman to serve as a councillor on the Birmingham City Council. She represented Edgbaston for 19 years. While on the city council, Martineau served on various committees. She chaired the Special Schools Sub-Committee of the Birmingham Education Committee from 1916, and the Mental Deficiency Act Committee which she chaired from 1921 to 1932. It has since been written that it was "Thanks to the determination of people like Ellen Pinsent and Clara Martineau [that] the numbers of children in special schools rose spectacularly in the early years of the 20th century."

Martineau was also a justice of the peace, and local president of the Brabazon Work Society.

In 1920, she wrote a pamphlet for the Women's Local Government Society: The Work awaiting Women on County Borough Councils (1920). In the 1920s, she was appointed to the Departmental Committee on Sexual Offences against Young Children, alongside figures including Clara Rackham and NSPCC director Robert Parr.

Clara Martineau died on 29 January 1932. In her will, she left money for the establishment of a seaside school for children with special educational needs.

== Martineau House ==
The new premises at Tywyn in Merionethshire, Wales – named Martineau House – were officially opened for use as a seaside summer school by the chairman of the Birmingham Education Committee on 12 July 1935. A bronze tablet in the hall of the house read:

This house was purchased in February, 1935, from moneys partly provided by a bequest from the late Councillor Clara Martineau and partly by the subscriptions of colleagues and teachers in recognition of her devoted services to these children and as a memorial to her.

The original house at Tywyn was later sold, and other premises bought at Bognor Regis, Sussex. These were sold in the 1980s. Today, the Clara Martineau Charity exists to:

Promote the residential education of children under the age of 19 years who have special ed. needs, and who are attending any school maintained by Birmingham City Council as local education authority. To provide facilities for recreation and other leisure time occupation for the benefit of such children with the object of improving their condition of life, with the same priority as aforesaid.
