= John Taylor (Unitarian hymn writer) =

English poet and composer (1750–1826)

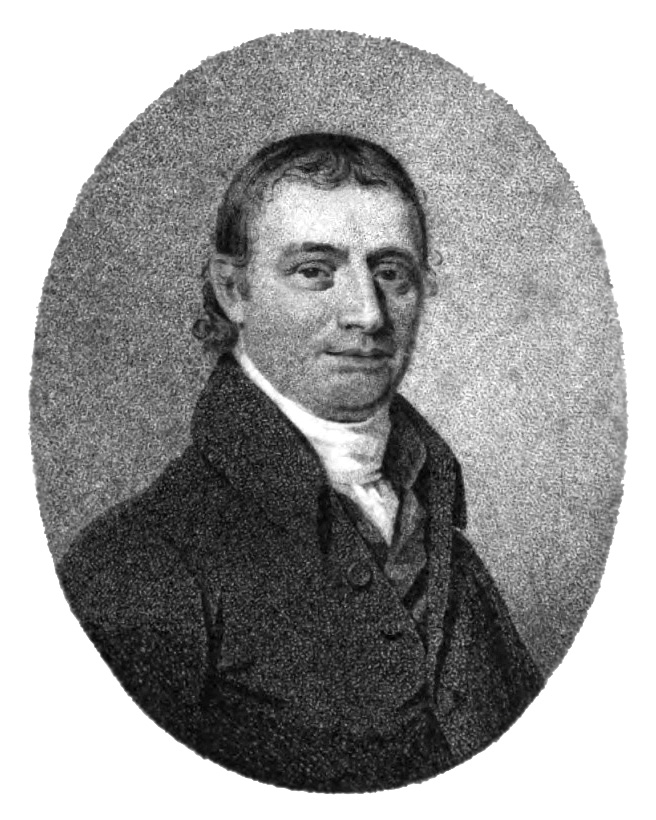
- Engraving after a portrait by Nathan Branwhite (1808)
- Born: 30 July 1750; Norwich, England
- Died: 23 June 1826 (aged 75)
- Known for: The Trumpet of Liberty
- Spouse: Susannah Taylor
- Children: 7, including John Taylor, Richard Taylor, Edward Taylor, Philip Taylor, Sarah Austin
- Relatives: Dr. John Taylor (grandfather)

John Taylor (30 July 1750 – 23 June 1826) was an entrepreneur, poet and composer of both secular (political) songs and hymns from Norwich, England.

== Early life ==
John Taylor was born to Richard (1719–1762) and Margaret Taylor (née Meadows, 1718–1781), and was baptised in the parish of St. George's Colegate, Norwich. Richard Taylor was a local manufacturer and son of Dr. John Taylor.

At age eight, Taylor was sent to study with a businessman in the village of Hindolveston. Shortly after his father's death in 1762 he returned home to assist his mother with her affairs.

== Career ==
Taylor returned to business three years later with an apprenticeship to two local manufacturers until 1768, when he left Norwich for a job as a bank-clerk in London, at Dinsdale, Archer and Ryde. It was during this time that he contributed occasional poetical pieces to the Morning Chronicle, one of which was entitled Verses written on the back of a Bank Note, a humorous look at the cashiers working the principal banking houses.

In 1773 he returned to Norwich and joined his brother Richard in the business of yarn manufacture. Four years later saw his marriage to Susanna, and the following year saw the beginnings of his work for the church. Taylor was first chosen to be a deacon, and went on to become treasurer of the church's benefactions. Taylor also oversaw the funding of local schools and his business expertise led to an increase in their funds.

In 1781 he was elected to the Board of Guardians, an organisation responsible for administering and distributing funds of parish workhouses, places where people who were unable to support themselves could go to live and work. While on the board, Taylor set about training the paupers of Norwich to spin yarn, earning many thousand pounds for the parish. In 1784, having restored the family fortunes, Taylor and his first cousin, surgeon Philip Meadows Martineau, took an active part in the foundation of the Norwich Public Library.

=== Politics ===
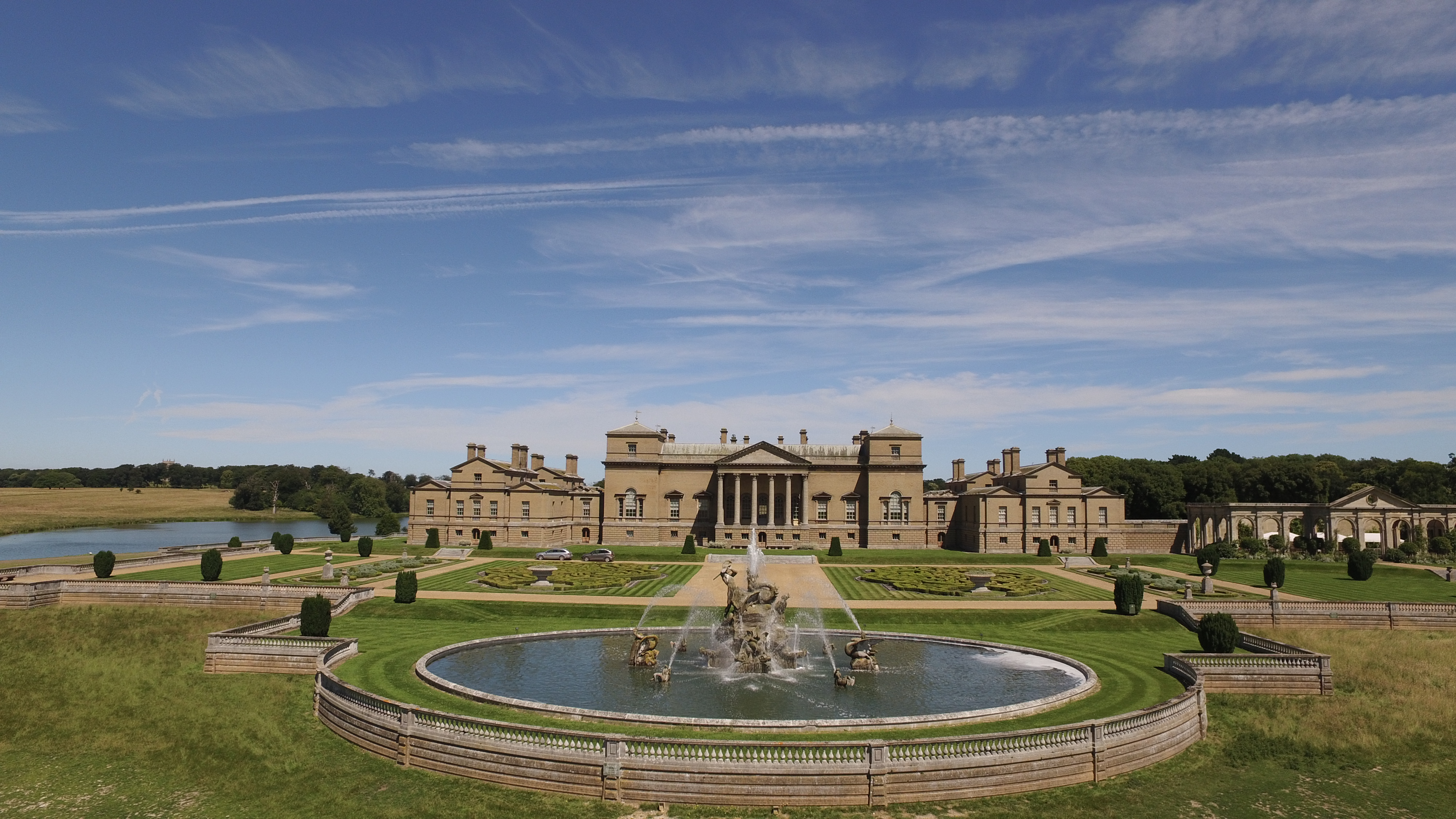
Holkham Hall

He developed an interest in local politics, joining the Whig party as a radical reformer, emerging as their leader in Norwich. He made social contact with HRH Duke of Sussex, the Duke of Albemarle, and Mr Coke, Squire of Holkham Hall (later Thomas Coke, 1st Earl of Leicester), who was nationally known as an agriculturalist. Taylor first sung his song The Trumpet of Liberty at the famous Whig banquet at Holkham Hall on 5 November 1788 to celebrate the centenary of the English Revolution. The Duke of Sussex "called on Taylor" to sing his song again on January 20, 1820 at "a great public dinner at St Andrews Hall, Norwich". On this occasion, "old John Taylor of Norwich" was reluctant to perform: "No please your Royal Highness, you know I got into trouble before". However, the prince responded, "Never fear, my back is broad enough to protect you" and then lead the chorus of Taylor's song.

== Illness and death ==
Starting around 1802, Taylor was afflicted by severe pains resulting from gout. He wrote the following about his illness:

These repeated, painful attacks naturally recall to my memory the sufferings of my excellent father. If the same bitter cup be preparing for me, what better can I wish than that I may quit the world with his composed spirit and his widow on the good providence of God!

— John Taylor, As quoted in his obituary by his son Edward Taylor

Taylor suffered many years of illness and found himself bedridden for a time. In the 1810s he regained some strength and by 1814 he contributed a selection of hymns for the congregation of the Octagon Chapel, a Chapel which his father had helped to build and maintain.

While Taylor was being driven by horse and carriage with his son Philip, the horse was spooked, causing its driver and passengers to be thrown on the road. Taylor lost consciousness and was returned to his son Philip's house at Halesowen; he did eventually regain consciousness, although he could not speak. Taylor had begun to regain his speech when he took another turn for the worse and he died on 23 June 1826 at Halesowen.

== Works ==
Amongst his various business duties Taylor also found time to express himself on paper:

- In 1784, inspired by a family reunion, he wrote his first family song; his song so pleased the attendees that it became regular practice for him to pen verses for festive gatherings.
- In 1788 Taylor wrote The Trumpet of Liberty, perhaps his best known work; on 5 November of that year Taylor sang this piece at a public dinner celebrating the first anniversary of the French Revolution.
- In 1790 he contributed poetry to The Norwich Cabinet, a radical political publication which also featured poems by Amelia Opie. In 1797 he also began to compile the history of the local Octagon congregation.

== Family ==
In 1777, John married Susannah Cook, daughter of John Cook. Their home became the centre of a radical social gathering. Guests included Sir James Mackintosh, Sir James Edward Smith the botanist, Henry Crabb Robinson the barrister, Robert Southey, poet laureate, and Cecilia Windham, wife of William Windham. Others to be found there were William Enfield, and some early supporters of the French Revolution: Edward Rigby, James Alderson, his daughter Amelia and her husband artist John Opie who painted for Taylor a portrait of Robert Southey.

John and Susannah raised seven children. Meticulous keepers of accounts, they drilled their children to be honest, to avoid debt, and to take control of their business dealings. Their sons were successful and prominent in learned societies. The children were:

- John (1779–1863);
- Richard (1781–1858);
- Edward (1784–1863);
- Philip (1786–1870);
- Susan (b. 1788), married Henry Reeve;
- Arthur (b. 1790), a printer and FSA, author of The Glory of Regality (London, 1820), and Papers in relation to the Antient Topography of the Eastern Counties (London, 1869).
- Sarah, wife of John Austin the jurist.
