= William Enfield =

British Unitarian minister

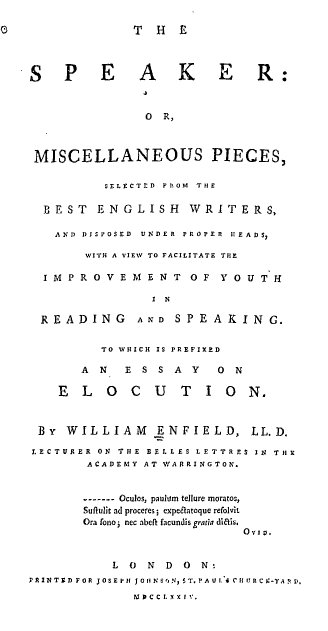
Title page from the first edition of The Speaker

William Enfield (29 March 1741 – 3 November 1797) was a British Unitarian minister who published a bestselling book on elocution entitled The Speaker (1774).

== Life ==
Enfield was born in Sudbury, Suffolk to William and Ann Enfield. In 1758, he entered Daventry Academy at the behest of his teacher and minister, William Hextal. In 1763 he became the minister at Benn's Garden Chapel in Liverpool, a wealthy and well-connected congregation. In 1767 Enfield married Mary Holland, the daughter of a local draper, and together they had five children. In 1770 he moved to Warrington to be the minister of the Cairo Street Chapel and a tutor of rhetoric and modern languages at Warrington Academy. He remained there until 1785, when he was called to be the minister of the Octagon Chapel, Norwich.

In Norwich Enfield's congregation assembled prominent families: the Martineaus, two unrelated Taylor families (those descending from John Taylor his predecessor at the Octagon, and that of William Taylor), and several others. His reputation was for bringing those of different views into polite discussion,, and he founded the Speculative Society, including Anglican and nonconformist clergy, and physicians.

Enfield died on 3 November 1797.

== Works ==
Despite being a Unitarian, Enfield still respected the Established Church and supported the government intertwined with it. When fellow Unitarian Joseph Priestley attacked these institutions, Enfield published Remarks on Several Late Publications in a Letter to Dr. Priestley (1770). Enfield believed that Dissenters would eventually win recognition from the government and decried Priestley's abrasive strategy. Priestley replied in a dismissive pamphlet, but the two still remained friends. Eventually, after the failure of the Feathers Tavern Petition, Enfield changed his position, agreeing with Priestley that Dissenting civil rights were too slow in coming.

Throughout his career, Enfield focused more on ethics than on theology in his many published sermons and essays. He was also a contributor to the Monthly Magazine and at his death had just started a biographical dictionary project with John Aikin, a friend from Warrington. Like Aikin and Priestley, Enfield wanted to remain current in many disciplines. Believing that natural philosophy was essential to his students, he studied mathematics one summer and subsequently published a textbook dedicated to Priestley: Institutes of Natural Philosophy, Theoretical and Experimental (1783).

His most successful work, however, was The Speaker (1774), an anthology of literary extracts intended to teach elocution, and produced first for his Warrington pupils. He published a sequel, Exercises in Elocution in 1780. Enfield's Speaker remained in print until the middle of the nineteenth century and inspired other anthologies, such as Mary Wollstonecraft's The Female Reader (1789).

Enfield industriously translated Brucker’s multi-volume Critical History of Philosophy.
