= William Fish (musician) =

English musician

William Fish (1775–1866) was an English musician.

== Life ==
Fish was from Norwich. He commenced his musical career as violinist which he was excellent at in the theatre orchestra there. After studying under Michael Sharp (1750 or 1751–1800), the oboist, and Capel Bond, the pianist and organist, he took part in local concerts and cathedral festivals. He was organist of St. Andrew's, Norwich, opened a music warehouse, and became well known in the neighbourhood as a teacher. He died 15 March 1866.

== Works ==
Fish's Opus I., a sonata in the Mozartean manner, was followed by a number of pianoforte pieces, some ballads (words and music by the composer) including The Morning Star, an oboe concerto, and some fantasias for the harp. His unpublished works are said to have included a manuscript cantata to words by Amelia Opie, and some pieces (presumably for band) played at the Norwich Theatre.
