= Theophilus Browne =

British minister

- Born: 1763; Derby
- Died: 1835
- Education: Christ's College, Cambridge
- Occupation: Clergyman
- Spouse: Ann

Theophilus Browne (1763–1835) was a Unitarian clergyman who was born in 1763 in Derby, England. He had a varied career, with a congregation once paying him to leave a chapel. He also proposed that church funds could be improved using state lotteries.

== Biography ==
Browne was born in Derby in 1763. He took holy orders after achieving the degrees of both a Bachelor and Master of Arts at Christ's College, Cambridge. He became a fellow of Peterhouse on 15 July 1785 and he took up the college living of Cherry Hinton, Cambridgeshire in December 1793. He resigned after adopting the positions of the Priestley school of Unitarians.

== Warminster and Norwich ==
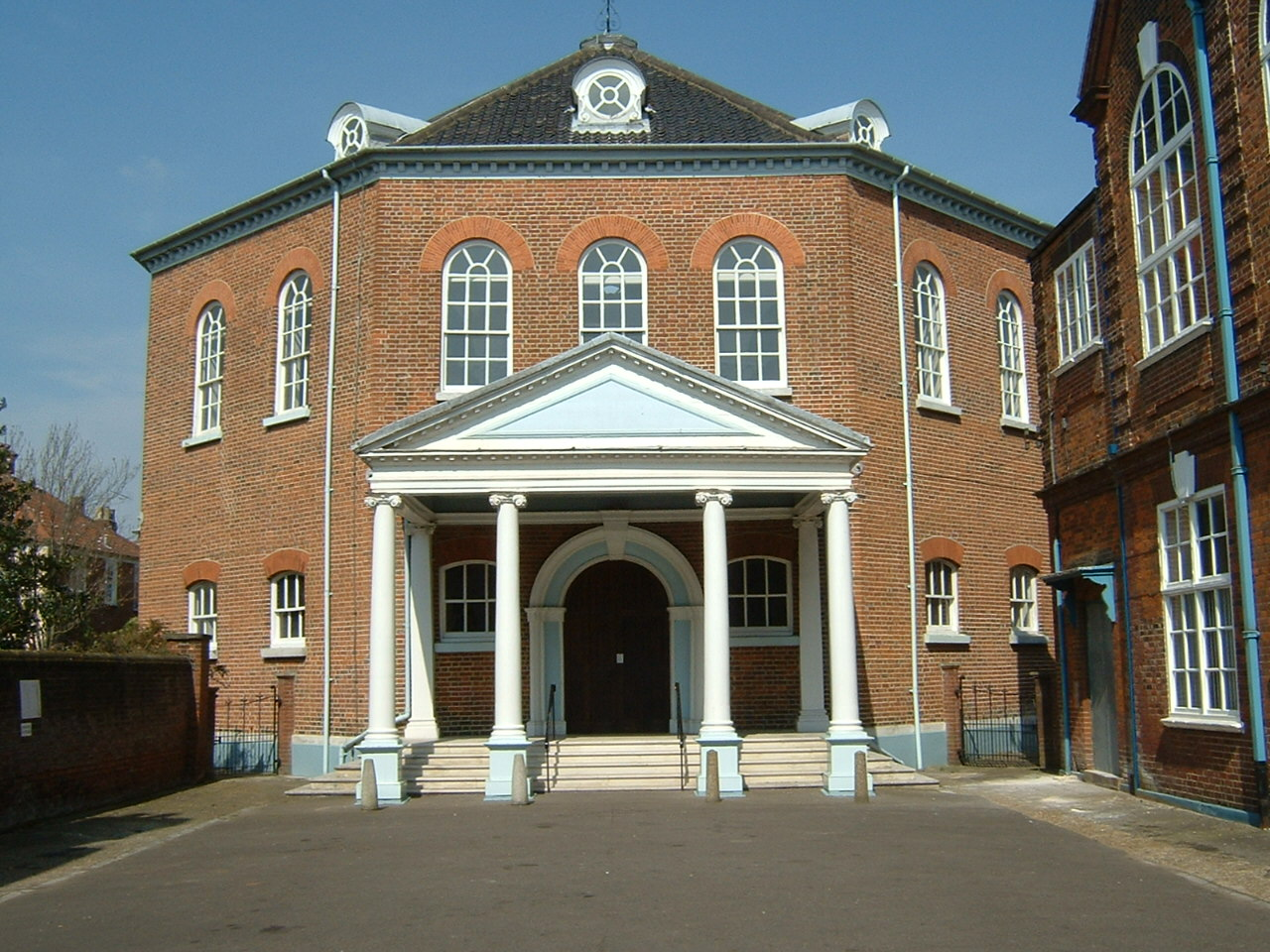
The Octagon chapel paid for Browne to leave

Browne became minister of the presbyterian congregation at Warminster in 1800. In 1807 he left Warminster after quarrelling with the congregation there for the post of classical and mathematical tutor at Manchester College, York. At midsummer, 1809, Browne left York to become minister of the Octagon Chapel, Norwich. He had preached at Norwich as a candidate in the previous January, and appears to have dissatisfied the college authorities by doing so without notice to them. His ministry at Norwich was unhappy; he is said to have magnified his office and not to have understood the dislike of his congregation to anything in the shape of a dogmatic creed. He took his stand upon his vested right to a small endowment, and was paid for his resignation at the end of 1810. He did not at once leave Norwich. A letter from him, dated Colgate, Norwich, 10 March 1812, appears in the Monthly Repository, in which he says he will be at liberty to take a congregation at the end of March, and offered to go on a six months' trial.

== Congleton ==
He was minister at Congleton from 1812 to 1814. For a short time he acted as a supply at Chester, but removed to Barton Street Chapel, Gloucester, in 1815. He established a fellowship fund at Gloucester on 1 November 1818, and a year or two afterward created some consternation by proposing that church funds should be invested in state lotteries, with a view to gaining windfalls for denominational purposes. He remained at Gloucester till the close of 1823. From this time he resided at Bath, preaching only occasionally. He took great interest in education, and was president of the Mechanics Institute in Bath.

Anne Browne, his wife, who was three years older than he was, died on Christmas Day in 1834. Browne died, after a short illness, on 20 May 1835 and was buried at Lyncomb Vale, near Bath. There is a tablet to his memory in Trim Street Chapel, Bath.

== Publications ==
1. Eight Forms of Prayer for Public Social Worship, Bath, 1803
2. Plain and Useful Selections from the Books of the Old and New Testament, 1805, 8vo (intended as a lectionary, but not much esteemed; Browne projected a sequel to be taken from the apocrypha).
3. Religious Liberty and the Rights of Conscience and Private Judgment grossly violated,, 1819, The terms in which he dedicated this pamphlet to the Rev. Thomas Belsham, gave offence to his fellow utilitarians.

Besides these he edited:

1. Select parts of William Melmoth's Great Importance of a Religious Life (originally published in 1711).
2. A selection of 'Sermons '(1818, 12mo) by Joshua Toulmin, D.D.
3. Devotional Addresses and Hymns (1818, 12mo), by William Russell of Birmingham.
