= Edward Taylor (music writer) =

British musician (1784–1863)

Edward Taylor (1784–1863) was an English singer, writer on music, and Gresham Professor of Music from 1837.

== Life ==
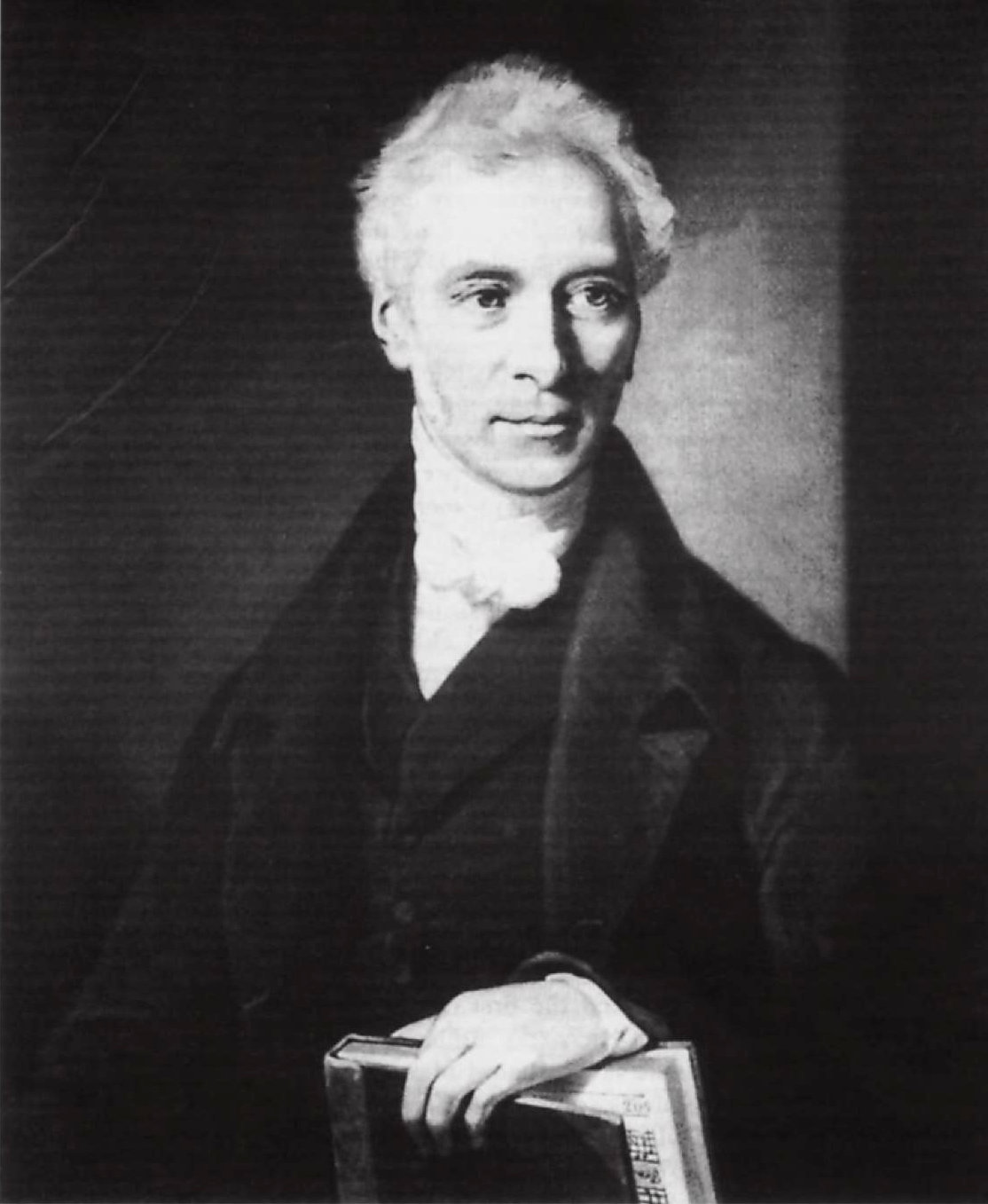

The son of John and Susannah Taylor, he was born at Norwich on 22 January 1784. From 1808 to 1815 Edward Taylor was in business at the corner of Rampant Horse Street, Norwich. He was Sheriff of Norwich in 1819.

In 1825, he moved to London, and joined his brother Philip Taylor and his cousin John Martineau as civil engineers at York Place, City Road. Want of success in the business led him to enter music in 1827, when he was 43. His early musical education had been disconnected: he had taken lessons from John Christmas Beckwith, organist of Norwich Cathedral, and on the flute and oboe from William Fish.

For the first anniversary Norwich musical festival of 1824, he had trained the chorus, the band, and singers, and made out the programme. His early successes were as singer. He sang at the festival of 1827, and conducted those of 1839 and 1842. For the festival of 1830 he translated Louis Spohr's Last Judgment, which was then performed for the first time in England. He was on good terms with Spohr, who was his guest at 3 Regent Square, King's Cross, in 1839 and 1847. He visited Spohr at Cassel in 1840. In addition to the Last Judgment, he translated Spohr's Crucifixion, or Calvary (1836), Fall of Babylon (1842), and Christian's Prayer, all of which were produced at Norwich Festivals.

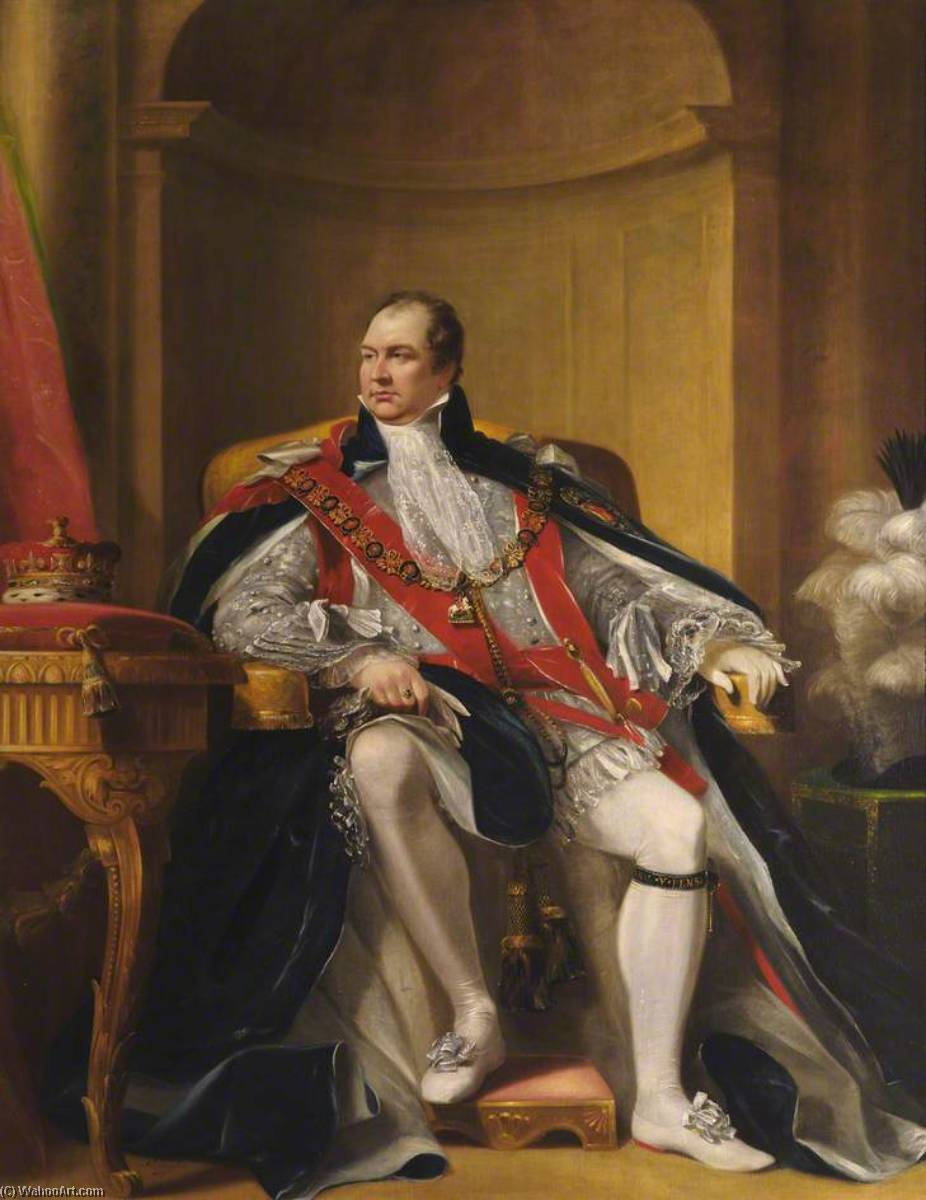
Taylor performed his song Here's To Sussex, Our Master to The Duke of Sussex (in Garter robes)

As a member of London's Masonic lodge, Taylor wrote a Masonic glee, Here's To Sussex, Our Master, which was sung in honor of the grandmaster of the lodge, Prince Augustus Frederick, Duke of Sussex who was present at the occasion which occurred on 27 January 1834 at Freemasons' Hall, London.

On 24 October 1837, on the death of Richard John Samuel Stevens, Taylor was appointed Gresham Professor of Music, a post which he held until his death in 1863.

In January 1838, Taylor gave his first three Gresham lectures, which were published that same year. For at least seven years before his professorship, Taylor had toured Britain, lecturing on musical subjects at the Mechanics' Institutes and literary and philosophical societies that existed in most large towns. One of his most popular lectures was a series of three illustrated talks that described English vocal music, which he delivered at (amongst many other places) Bristol in January 1837. It was Taylor's lectures in Bristol that gave the idea for the formation of the Bristol Madrigal Society, which exists to this day under its current guise, the Bristol Chamber Choir. From 1829 to 1843, Taylor was music critic of The Spectator.

He died at his house, Gresham Cottage, Cornlands Road, Brentwood, Essex, on 12 March 1863, and was buried in the old dissenting burial-ground, King's Road, Brentwood.

== Works ==
Taylor's works include songs, song texts, and textual adaptations. He translated Friedrich Schneider and Eberhard von Groote's Die Sündfluth as The Deluge, the Mozart Requiem under the title of Redemption (1836, published 1845), and Haydn's The Seasons. The Vocal School of Italy in the Sixteenth Century (1839), comprises a selection of madrigals and anthems by Italian masters, adapted to English words.

Taylor edited Purcell's King Arthur for the Musical Antiquarian Society (1843); and The People's Music Book (1844), in collaboration with James Turle. 'The Cathedral Service, its Glory, its Decline, and its Designed Extinction', appeared as two anonymous articles in the British and Foreign Review (nos. 33 and 35) in 1844, and were republished together as a single tract, also anonymously, in 1845.
