= Sarah Austin (translator) =

English translator of German (1793–1867)

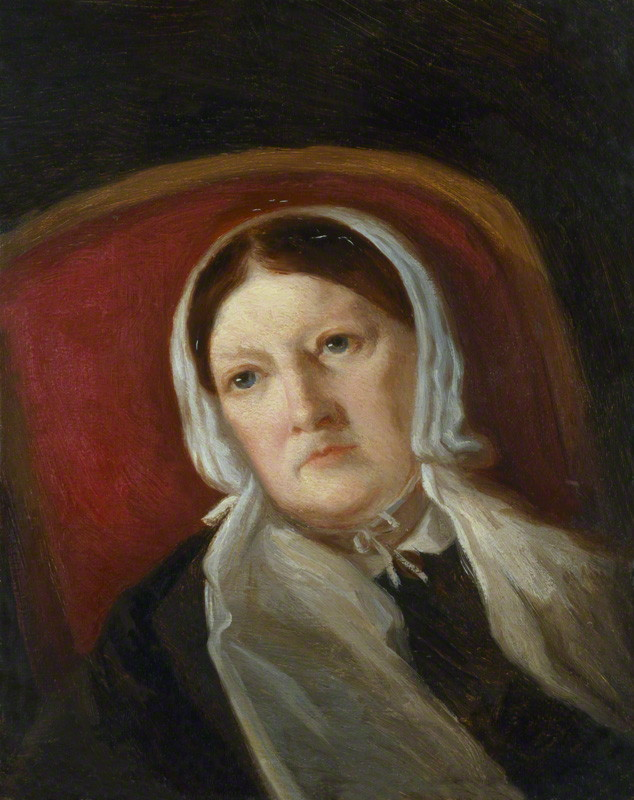
- Born: Sarah Taylor; 1793; Norwich, England
- Died: 8 August 1867 (aged 73–74); Weybridge, Surrey, England
- Occupation: Translator

Sarah Austin (née Taylor; 1793 – 8 August 1867) was an English editor, linguist and translator from German-language books. She did much to make Germany familiar to the English.

== Life ==
Born Sarah Taylor in Norwich, England in 1793, she was the youngest child of John Taylor, a yarn maker and hymn writer from a locally well-known Unitarian family. Her education was overseen by her mother, Susannah Taylor. She became conversant in Latin, French, German and Italian. Her six brothers and sisters included Edward Taylor (1784–1863), a singer and music professor, John Taylor (1779–1863), a mining engineer, Richard Taylor (1781–1858), a printer and editor and publisher of scientific works. Family friends included James Alderson and his daughter Amelia Opie, Henry Crabb Robinson, the banking Gurneys and Sir James Mackintosh.

Sarah grew up to be an attractive woman. She caused surprise by marrying John Austin (1790–1859) on 24 August 1819. During the first years of their married life they lived a wide social life in Queen's Square, Westminster. John Stuart Mill testified the esteem he felt for her by the title of Mutter, by which he always addressed her. Jeremy Bentham was also in their circle. She travelled widely, for instance to Dresden and Weimar. According to a modern scholar, Austin "tended to be austere, reclusive, and insecure, while she was very determined, ambitious, energetic, gregarious, and warm. Indeed her affections were so starved that in the early 1830s she had a most unusual 'affair' with Hermann Pückler-Muskau, a German prince whose work she translated. It was conducted solely in letters – she did not meet him until their passions had cooled."

The only child of the Austins' marriage, Lucie, was likewise a translator of German works. She married Alexander Duff-Gordon. Her 1843 translation of Stories of the Gods and Heroes of Greece by Barthold Georg Niebuhr was erroneously ascribed to her mother. The family history was recorded in Three Generations of English Women (1893), by Sarah Taylor's granddaughter, Janet Ross.

== Works ==
Austin was initially encouraged as an author by the American John Neal, who sent her first works to the Edinburgh Review. Her writing and literary translations soon became important sources of income for her and her husband. She did much to promote her husband's works in his life and published a collection of his lectures on jurisprudence after he died. In 1833, she published Selections from the Old Testament, arranged under heads to illustrate the religion, morality, and poetry of the Hebrew Scriptures. "My sole object," she wrote in the preface, "has been to put together all that presented itself to my own heart and mind as most persuasive, consolatory, or elevating, in such a form and order as to be easy of reference, conveniently arranged and divided, and freed from matter either hard to be understood, unattractive, or unprofitable (to say the least) for young and pure eyes." In the same year, she published one of the translations by which she is best known: Characteristics of Goethe from the German of Falk, Von Müller, and others, with valuable original notes, illustrative of German literature. Her own criticisms are few, but highly relevant.

In 1834, Austin translated The Story without an End by Friedrich Wilhelm Carové, which was often reprinted. In the same year she translated the famous report on the State of Public Instruction in Prussia, addressed by Victor Cousin to Marthe Camille Bachasson, Count of Montalivet, minister of public instruction. The preface pleads eloquently for the cause of national education. "Society," she says, "is no longer a calm current, but a tossing sea; reverence for tradition, for authority, is gone. In such a state of things who can deny the absolute necessity of national education?" In 1839 she returned to the subject in a pamphlet, first published as an article in the Foreign Quarterly Review, where she argued from the experience of Prussia and France for the need to establish a national system of education in England.

One of her last publications (1859) were two letters addressed to the Athenæum, on girls' schools and on the training of working women, which show she had modified her opinions. Speaking of the old village schools, she admits that the teachers possessed little book lore. They were often widows "better versed in the toils and troubles of life than in chemistry or astronomy.... But the wiser among them taught the great lessons of obedience, reverence for honoured eld, industry, neatness, decent order, and other virtues of their sex and stations," and trained their pupils to be the wives of working men. In 1827 Mrs Austin left with her husband for Germany and settled in Bonn. She collected in her long residence abroad materials for her 1854 work Germany from 1760 to 1814, which still holds a place as an interesting, thoughtful survey of German institutions and manners.

In the autumn of 1836 she accompanied her husband to Malta, busying herself while there with investigations into the remains of Maltese art. They returned to Germany, then passed to Paris, where they remained until driven home by the revolution of 1848. In 1840 she translated Leopold von Ranke's History of the Popes, which was warmly praised by Thomas Babington Macaulay and Henry Hart Milman. When the translation appeared, her intimate friend Sir George Cornewall Lewis wrote to her: "Murray is very desirous that you should undertake some original work. Do you feel a 'Beruf' of this sort?" However, she felt no such "Beruf" (calling) and most of her subsequent works were translations.

After her husband's death in 1859 Sarah Austin produced a coherent, near-complete edition of his Lectures on Jurisprudence, a huge task that required assembling his scattered notes and marginalia. Her modesty about her contribution to her husband's publications was recognized only by later authors. She also edited the Memoirs of Sydney Smith (1855) and Lady Duff-Gordon's Letters from Egypt (1865).

Sarah Austin's style is clear, unaffected and forcible. She adopted a high standard for the duties of a translator and sought to conform to it rigorously. "It has been my invariable practice," she said, "as soon as I have engaged to translate a work, to write to the author of it, announcing my intention, and adding that if he has any correction, omission, or addition to make, he might depend on my paying attention to his suggestions." She did much to make the best minds of Germany familiar to Englishmen and she left a literary reputation due as much to her conversation and correspondence with illustrious men of letters as to her works.

Here is a list of her other principal works, not named so far:

- Translation of a Tour in England, Ireland, and France by a German Prince, (London, 1832), after Pückler's Briefe eines Verstorbenen
- Translation of Raumer's England in 1835, 1836
- Fragments from German Prose Writers, 1841
- History of the Reformation in Germany and History of the Popes (1840), from the German of Leopold von Ranke
- Sketches of Germany from 1760 to 1814 (1854), dealing with political and social circumstances during that period.
- Translation of François Guizot on the Causes of the Success of the English Revolution, 1850
- Memoirs of the Duchess of Orleans, 1859
- Lady Duff Gordon's Letters from Egypt, edited by Mrs. Austin, 1865
- Letters of Sydney Smith, 1855 (second volume of Lady Holland's Life and Letters)

== Death ==
Sarah Austin died at Weybridge, Surrey, on 8 August 1867. She was buried beside her husband in the Weybridge churchyard. Her estate, worth less than £5000, received probate on 28 August 1867 through her executor son-in-law, Sir Alexander Cornewall Duff-Gordon.

== Sources ==
- Ross, Janet (1893). Three Generations of English Women: Memoirs and Correspondence of Susannah Taylor, Sarah Austin, and Lady Duff Gordon. London: T. Fisher Unwin.
