= Octagon Chapel, Norwich =

Chapel in England

Coordinates: 52.6335°N 1.2952°E

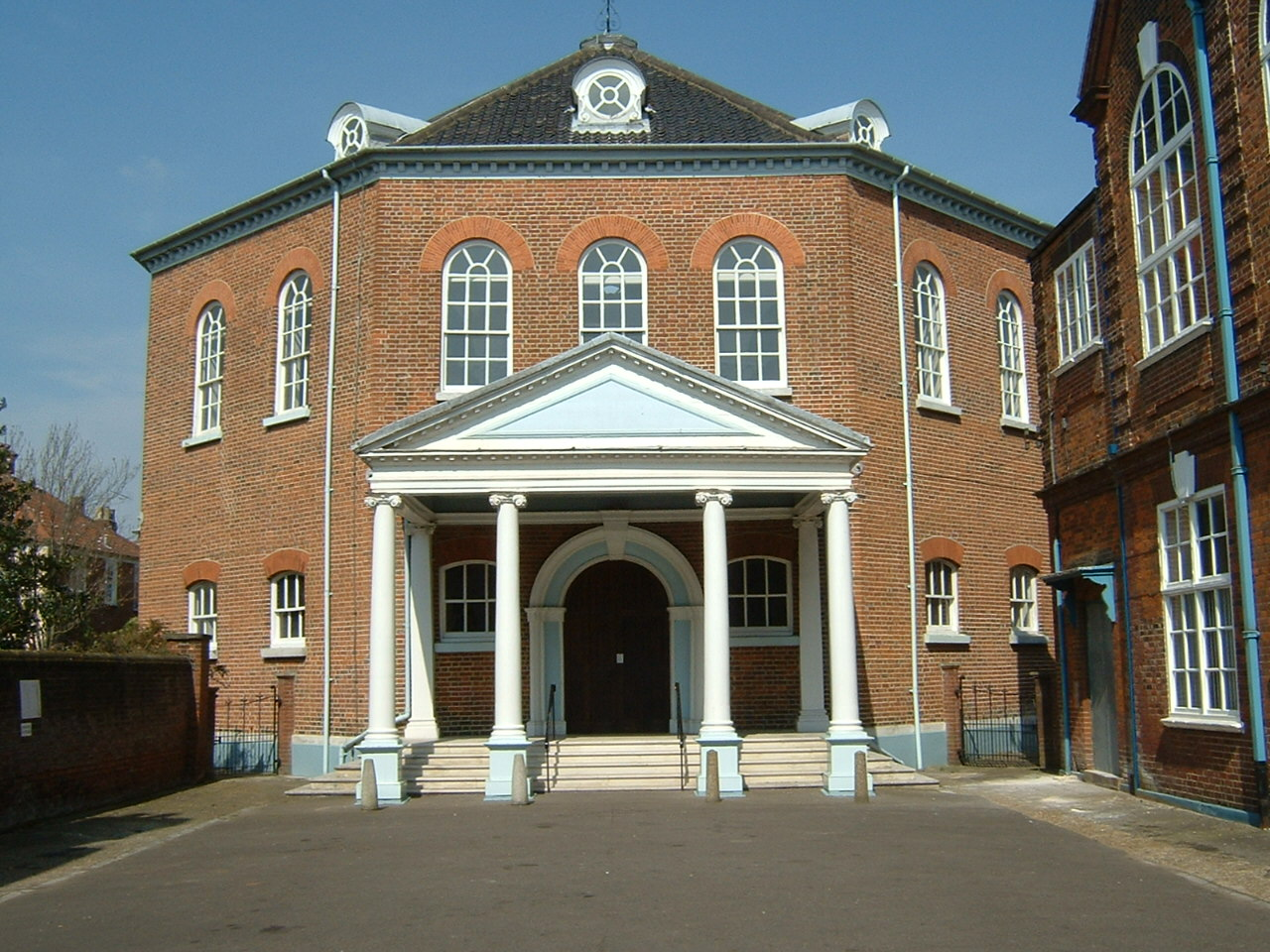
The Octagon Chapel, Norwich.

The Octagon Chapel is a Unitarian Chapel located in Colegate in Norwich, Norfolk, England. The congregation is a member of the General Assembly of Unitarian and Free Christian Churches.

== History ==
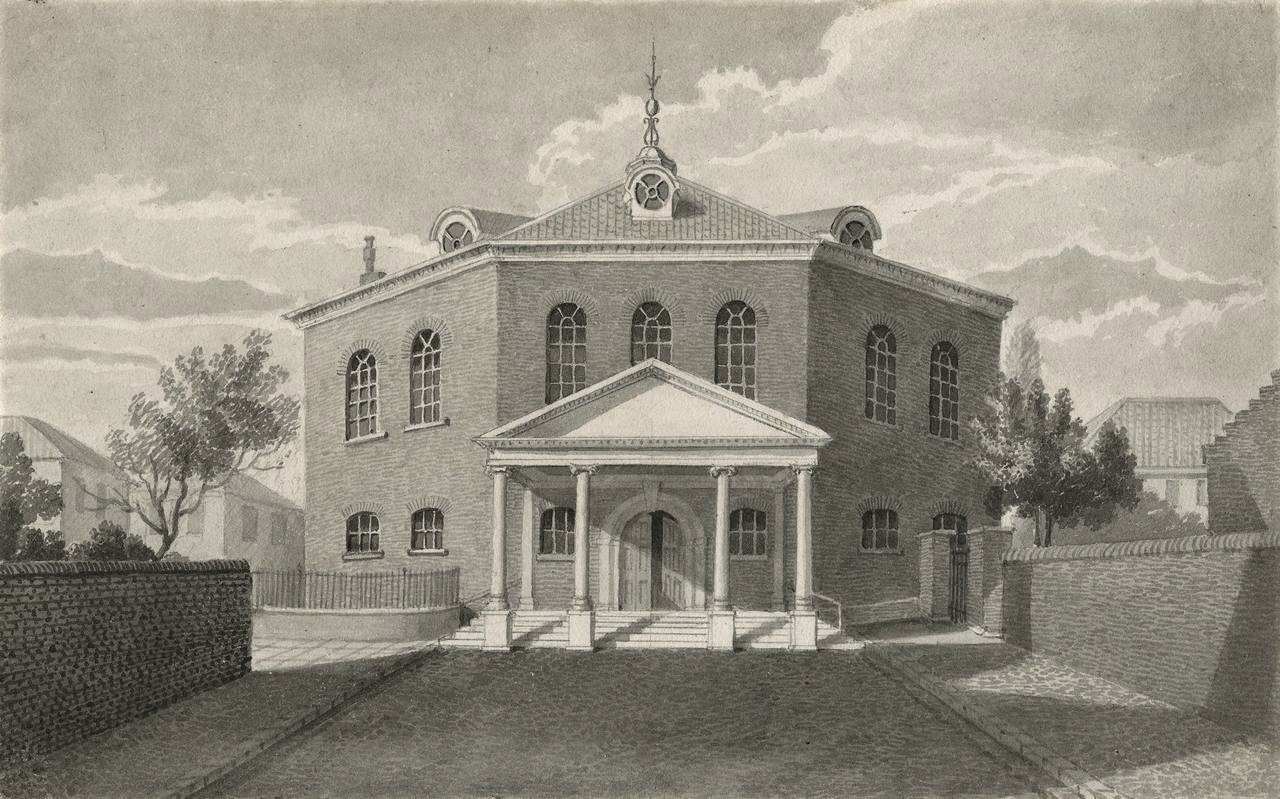
James Sillett - The Octagon Chapel, Norwich (Norfolk Museums Collections)

The chapel is a grade II* listed building. Completed in 1756 by the architect Thomas Ivory, it is perfectly octagonal, and a fine example of English Neo-Palladian architecture.

Originally built as a Presbyterian Chapel, the building now serves the Unitarian Community. Theophilus Browne was appointed minister in 1809, but was paid to leave the following year. William Taylor, R. H. Mottram, John Taylor and Susannah Taylor, Samuel Bourn and Harriet Martineau and Peter Finch Martineau are all associated with the Chapel. Composer Edward Taylor was organist for a while, and in 1812 published a collection of Psalm and Hymn Tunes for the chapel.

== Community ==
Unitarians have no dogma or creed, and take inspiration from all religious teachings, as well as from science and the arts.

- Bring and share lunches
- Craft Group
- LGBTQ+ Coffee and cake
- Engagement groups

== Octagon Concert Series ==
The Octagon has a long musical heritage. It hosts the Octagon Concert Series, from which, because no performer receives a fee or expenses, all money raised is donated to charity.

== See also ==
- Octagon Chapel, Liverpool
- First Unitarian Church of Philadelphia
