= Martineau family =

English family of Huguenot background

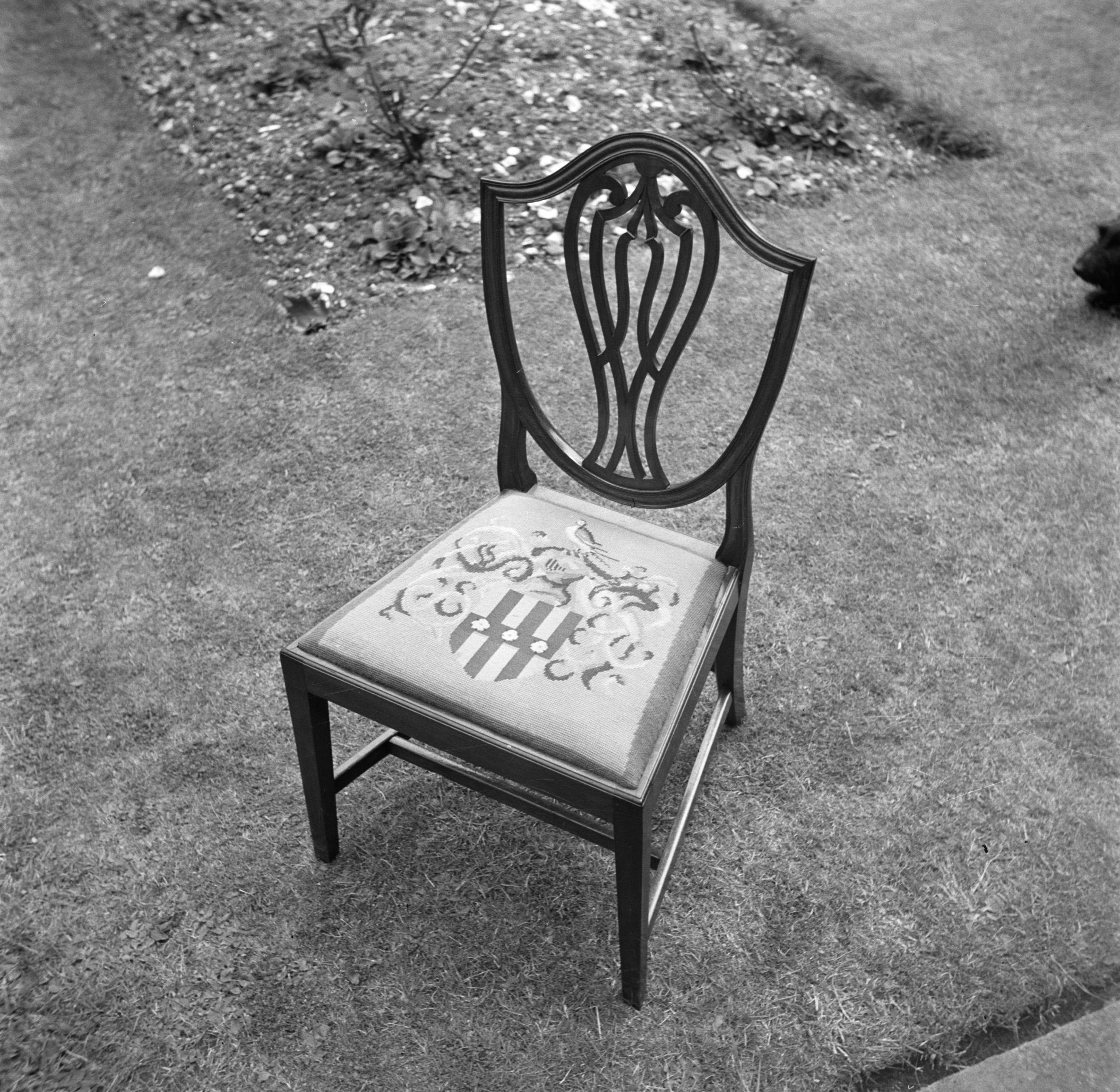
Martineau coat of arms embroidered into seat of chair belonging to John Edmund Martineau

The Martineau family is an intellectual, business (banking, breweries, textile manufacturing) and political dynasty associated first with Norwich and later also London and Birmingham, England. Many members of the family have been knighted. Many family members were prominent Unitarians; a room in London's Essex Hall, the headquarters building of the British Unitarians, was named after them. Martineau Place in Birmingham's central business district was named in their honour.

Harriet Martineau (1802–1876), the sociologist and abolitionist, is the family's most celebrated member.

In Birmingham, several of its members have been Lord Mayor. They worshipped at the Church of the Messiah. As Unitarians, they married into families of the same denomination, such as the Kenricks and the Chamberlains, though Harriet eventually became an atheist in contrast to her brother, the religious philosopher James Martineau. Several of the Martineaus are buried in Key Hill Cemetery, Birmingham, either in the family vault or separately.

== Huguenot beginnings ==
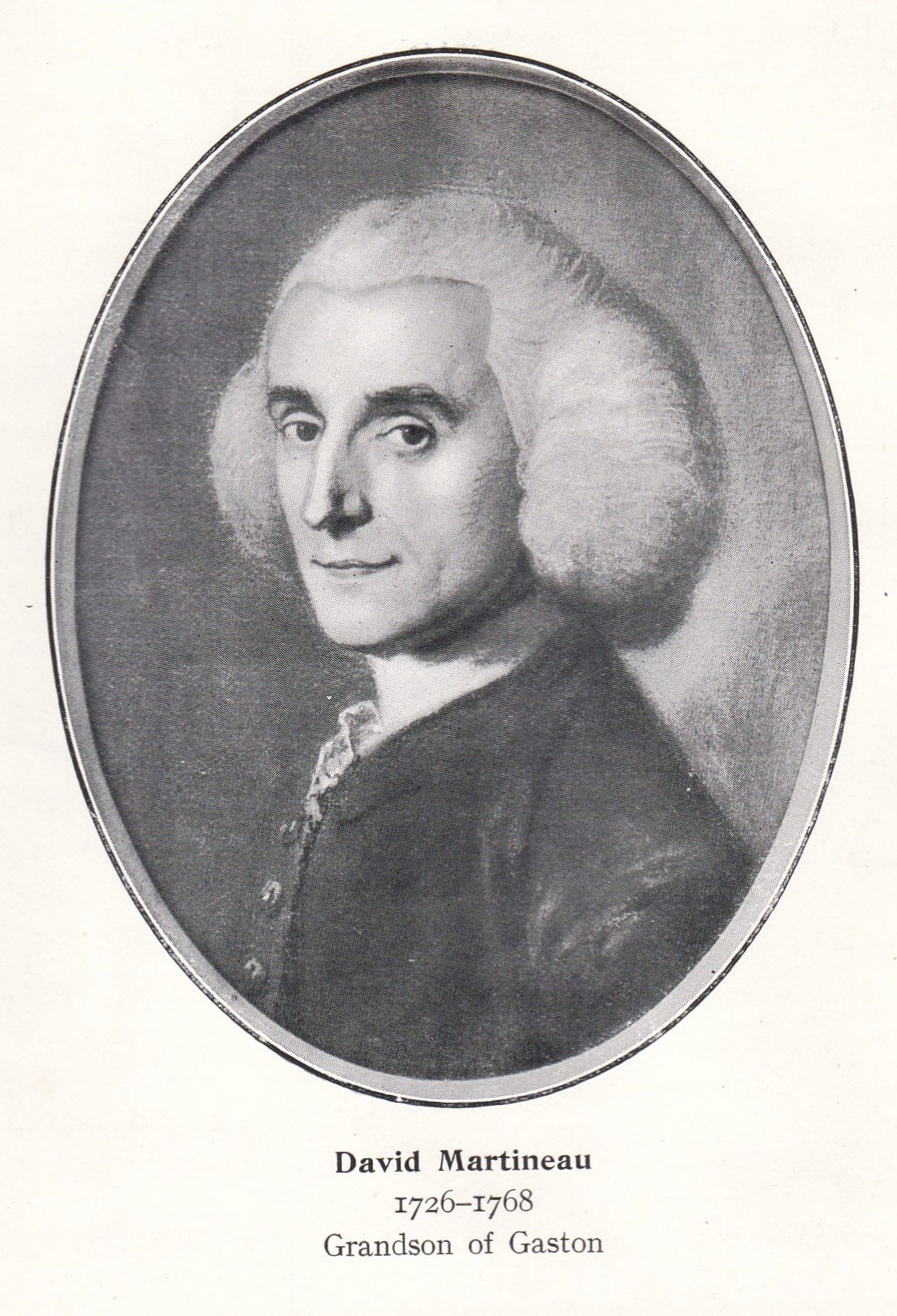
Norwich Maître Chirurgien (Master Surgeon), David Martineau II

The Martineaus came from a Huguenot immigrant background, and were noted in the medical, intellectual and business fields. In France, the family had registered their Arms: 'Azure three towers Argent'. Gaston Martineau (c. 1654 – 1726), a surgeon in Dieppe, moved to Norwich after the Revocation of the Edict of Nantes in 1685; the edict had allowed French Protestants freedom of religion and the Huguenots left France for safety.

=== French nobility heritage ===
Initially Calvinist dissenters, Gaston and his wife raised their children to be bilingual in French and English. Gaston's father, Elie, was the first cousin of Pierre Martineau, Sieur du Port (Lord of the Port, 1659–1699), conseiller et avocat (advisor and lawyer) to King Louis XIV. Gaston's grandson, David Martineau II (1726–1768), was the third generation of master surgeons (Maître Chirurgien), and had five sons who made up the male line of Martineaus. David and his wife were buried in St Mary the Less, Norwich (l'Église Protestante Française de Norwich) where a mural tablet commemorates his "eminence in his skill as a Surgeon" and his wife, Dame Sarah Martineau, who was "distinguished for sound judgement, warm affection and fervent piety". Their eldest son, surgeon Philip Meadows Martineau, of Bracondale Estate was an active member of the French community in Norwich – he was Deacon of the city's French Congregation - and lived in Paris for some time. A member of the Royal Society and the Medical and Chirurgical Society of London, Martineau was spoken of in Paris as "le lithotomiste le plus éminent et le plus heureux de son époque".

=== Religion ===
By the fourth generation the family was divided into Unitarians and Anglicans, the latter including Arthur Martineau (1806–1872), a Fellow of Trinity College, Cambridge University and Prebendary of St Paul's Cathedral. Arthur's wife was the Hon. Anne (daughter of Sir Edward O'Brien, 4th Baronet) who, in 1862, was granted the rank of a Baron's daughter. Arthur was the great-grandson of David Martineau II and the son of John Martineau of Stamford Hill (1758–1834). He studied at Harrow and Trinity College, Cambridge - where he was one of the Cambridge Apostles - and was a chaplain to the Bishop of London and the Archbishop of Canterbury. He was Vicar of Whitkirk, near Leeds from 1838 until 1863.

== Philip Meadows Martineau and family ==
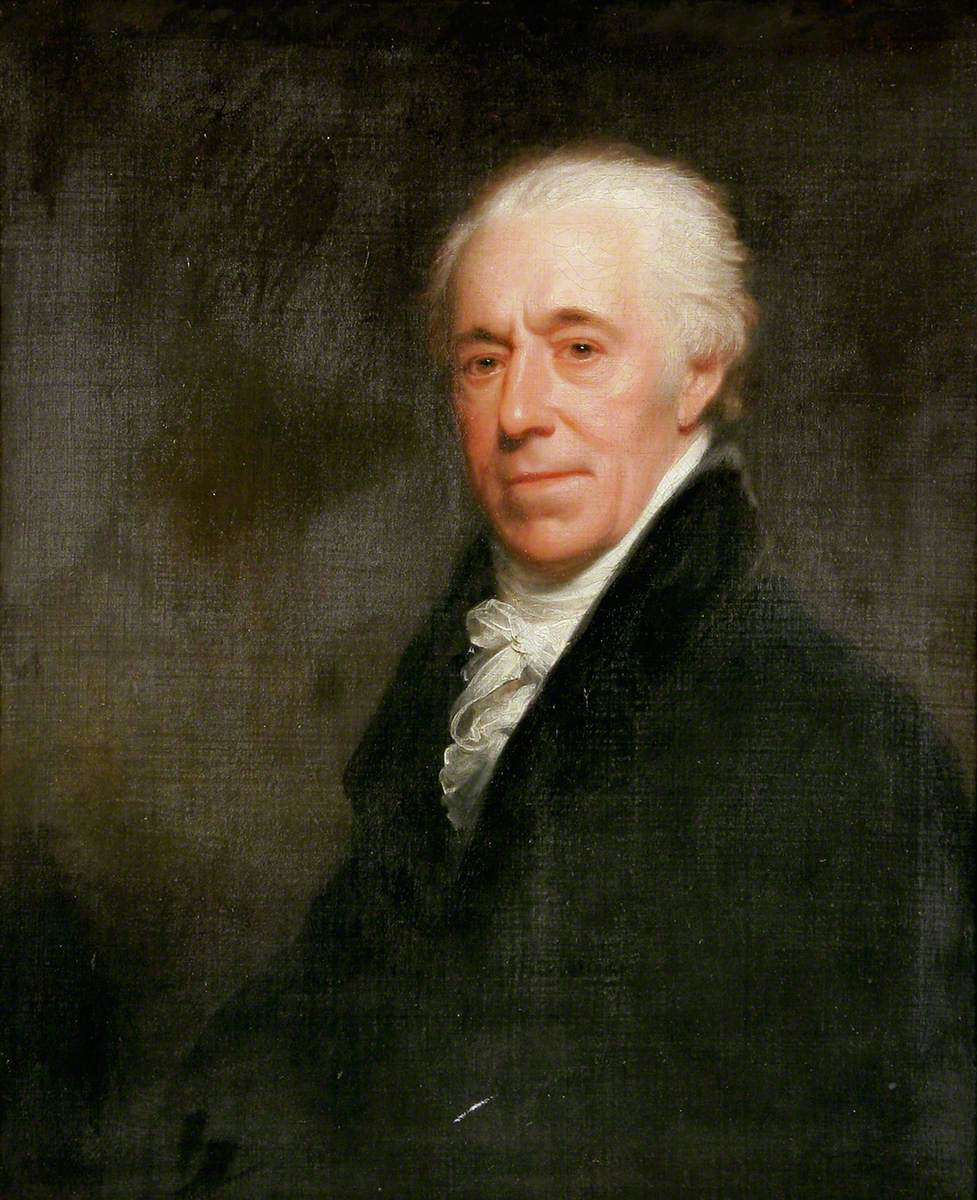
Philip Meadows Martineau, Esq., Lord of the manor of Carrow (died 1829) by Sir William Beechey

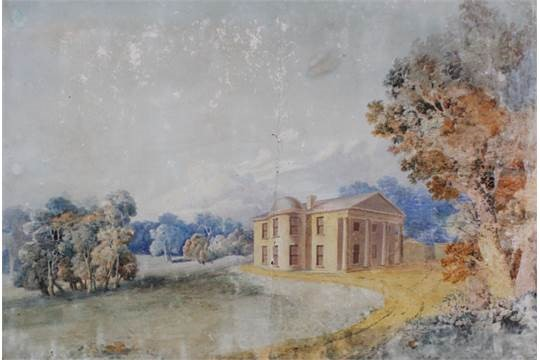
Bracondale Hall surrounded by Martineau's Wood, painted by David Hodgson

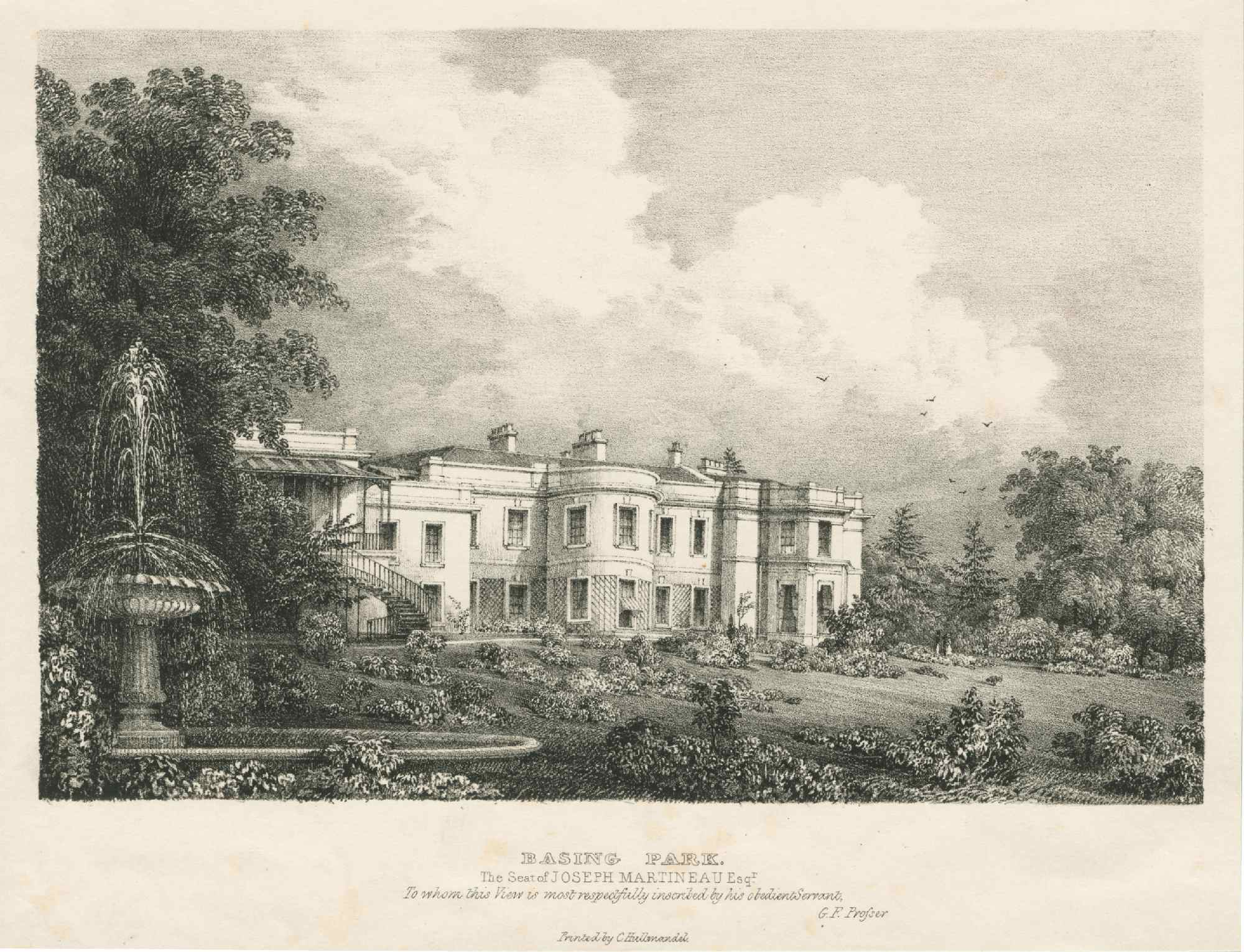
1833 – Basing Park, Seat of Joseph Martineau, Esq.

The eldest of the five sons of David Martineau II and Sarah Meadows (1725–1800) was Philip Meadows Martineau (1752–1829). A surgeon, Martineau was "one of the most distinguished lithotomists of his day". Apprenticed to the surgeon William Donne, who was noted for skill in lithotomy, he studied medicine at several universities. After Edinburgh University in 1773, "in 1775 he passed through London for a turn of 12 months". He then returned in 1777 to Norwich to become Donne's partner, and carried on his speciality. Henry Herbert Southey was his student. He had one daughter. Martineau and friends set up the Norfolk and Norwich Trienniel Festival to raise money for the Norfolk and Norwich Hospital.

The Martineau and Taylor families were "at the head of the Whig party in Norwich" and by the 1780s, Philip's first cousin, poet and composer John Taylor (1750–1826) was hosting radical parties at his home in Norwich which Philip's family attended, including his mother Sarah, to whom John Taylor, her nephew, was "much attached". A number of other Norwich Whig "worthies" attended these events. By 1784, the two cousins, Philip and John, had established the Norwich City Library and the annual reunion of the Martineau and Taylor families which continued well into the 1850s.

Martineau was a medical colleague and friend of Dr Sylas Neville. The two men and their families accompanied Martineau's cousin John Taylor to a great banquet at Holkham Hall on the night of 5 November 1788 celebrating the Glorious Revolution of 1688. Their host was Thomas Coke, 1st Earl of Leicester who encouraged John to sing the song he had written for the occasion – The Triumph of Liberty. Over 500 guests were invited to the event, almost all of whom, including invitee the Prince of Wales were "Whig elites".

Having purchased the Bracondale Woods on the outskirts of Norwich in 1793, in 1811 he acquired the adjacent property of Carrow Abbey. By around 1797 he had built Bracondale Hall, described in 1847 as a "handsome mansion with pleasure grounds delightfully laid out" by Humphry Repton who had also designed the gardens of Holkham Hall, owned by Martineau's friend, Thomas Coke, 1st Earl of Leicester. From the ruins of Carrow Abbey, Martineau also constructed on his estate a "small gothic priory with windows of ancient stained glass". By 1879, this estate, including the Manor of Carrow, had been sold following the death of Martineau's unmarried daughter Frances Anne.

The second son, David Martineau (1754–1840), had four sons and six daughters and the third, Peter Finch Martineau (1755–1847), had four sons and two daughters. The fourth son, John Martineau of Stamford Hill, had 14 children, including John Martineau the engineer and Joseph Martineau (1786–1863) whose wife Caroline (née Parry) was presented to King George IV in May 1824 at St James Palace. The fifth son, Thomas, is mentioned below.

== Thomas Martineau and family ==
The 1939 edition of Burke's Landed Gentry lists Thomas Martineau (1764–1826), as a "manufacturer" (textiles) and the fifth son of David Martineau II and Sarah Meadows, whose siblings were Margaret (1718–1781, mother of John Taylor) and Philip Meadows (1719–1783), solicitor and Lord of the manor of Diss, Norfolk. On 13 January 1855, the Examiner reported that the siblings' "collateral ancestor was Sir Philip Meadows, the ambassador of Oliver Cromwell".

Thomas grew up in Norwich, attending family friend Mrs Barbauld's school, the Palgrave Academy in Suffolk. A "reading man" himself, in Martineau's family "there was always discussions about books and ideas". Thomas Martineau and his first cousin John Taylor were deacons of Norwich's Unitarian church, the Octagon Chapel. Alongside John Taylor, Martineau and his two brothers, Philip Meadows and David, are recorded in 1819 as being commissioners for the "City and County of the City of Norwich". Thomas Martineau and John Taylor were both benefactors of Harris Manchester College, Oxford University, when the college was in York, and proprietors of the Bow Gas Company, which obtained their act of parliament on 1 May 1821, but had run into questionable financial circumstances by 1823.

Thomas married Elizabeth Rankin (8 October 1772 – 26 August 1848) in 1793. Elizabeth had her portrait painted a year before her death by a member of the Bonham Carter family.

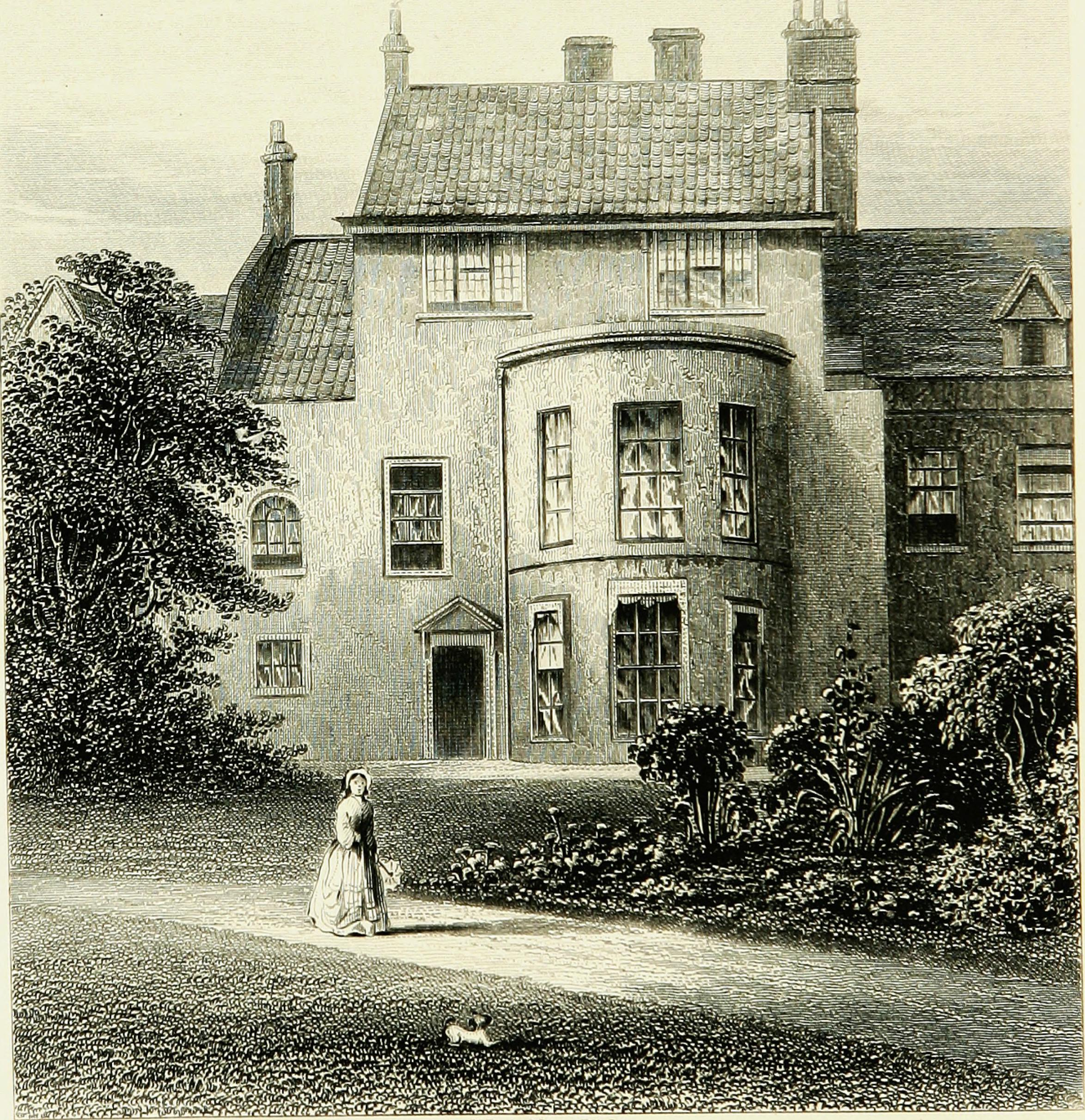
Gurney Court – "Martineau House" – in Magdalen Street, Norwich, was home to Thomas Martineau from the 1790s.

By the 1790s, Thomas had acquired the leasehold of Gurney Court in Magdalen Street, Norwich. His older children, including Robert (1798–1870) and Harriet, were born at Gurney Court, which was owned by the Gurney family. The two Nonconformist Norwich families were close and would eventually intermarry with the marriage, in 1879, of Frances Julia Martineau (1853–1931) – Peter Finch Martineau's great-granddaughter – to the Rev. Joseph John Gurney (1848–1890) of Earlham Hall, the Gurney's family seat. Joseph John Gurney later lived at Bracondale Hall, once the home of Thomas' brother, Philip Meadows Martineau.

It was at Thomas's home – "commemoratively known as Martineau House" – that literary illustrissimo including Amelia Opie and Anna Letitia Barbauld were entertained. Thomas' finances and investments remained viable until around 1825–26, when, in the Panic of 1825, the stock market and banking system collapsed. Thomas died on 21 June 1826 and is buried at Rosary Cemetery, the first non-denominational burial ground in the United Kingdom.

Thomas and Elizabeth had eight children. Thomas and Elizabeth Martineau's eldest child was a daughter, Elizabeth "Lissey" (1794–1850), who married Dr Thomas Greenhow, a reforming doctor in Newcastle, co-founder of the city's eye infirmary. Elizabeth's cousin George (1792–1857), son of David Martineau (1754–1840) married Greenhow's sister Sarah (1801–1891). Their daughter Lucy Martineau (1832–1860) married Sir Alfred Wills.

The Greenhows' daughter Frances married into the Lupton family of Leeds. Frances was an educationalist and worked to expand educational opportunities for girls. Honouring the Martineau lineage, Frances' eldest son was named Francis Martineau Lupton (1848–1921) whose great-grandson was Stephen Martineau Middleton (born 1945).

Thomas and Elizabeth Martineau's eldest son was Thomas (1795–1824), a surgeon who co-founded the Norfolk and Norwich Eye Infirmary, which later became part of the Norfolk and Norwich Hospital.

Another son, Robert (1798–1870), became a magistrate, town councillor and then Mayor of Birmingham in 1846. He married Jane Smith (died 1874). He hired John Barnsley to build a mansion in Edgbaston, with a large wing for his mother, who lived there till her death in 1848, and another for his own family. Barnsley had already built most of Birmingham's grand Victorian and Edwardian public buildings.

Their best known child was their sixth, Harriet (1802–1876), the political author and a pioneer sociologist. She sometimes stayed with her widowed mother and her brother Robert, including during his mayoral tenure. The three of them, and other members of the family, are buried together in the Martineau vault at the Key Hill Cemetery, Birmingham.

Their seventh child, James (1805–1900), was a religious philosopher and a professor at Manchester New College. He was a guest teacher in Liverpool, where his sister, Rachel (1800–1876), ran a private girls' school which was attended by Elizabeth Gaskell's daughters. James's daughter was the watercolourist Edith Martineau (1842–1909).

== Sir Thomas Martineau and family ==
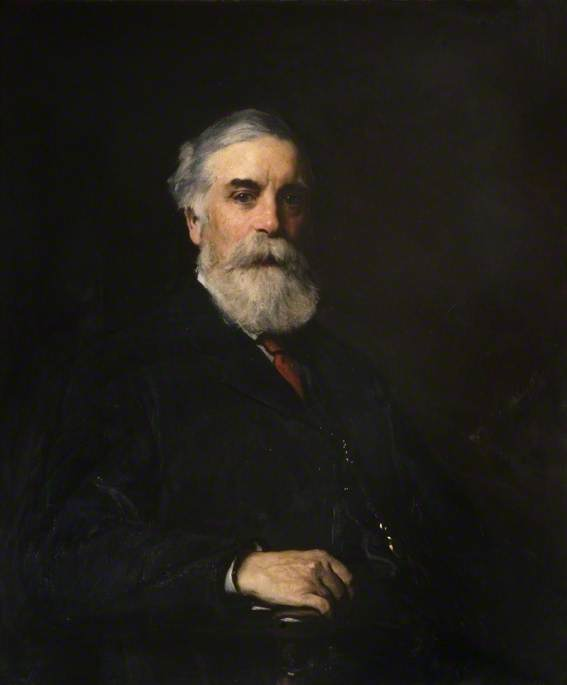
Politician Sir Thomas Martineau (1828–1893), painted by Frank Holl, was the uncle (by marriage) of Prime Minister Neville Chamberlain.

Sir Thomas Martineau (4 November 1828 – 28 July 1893) was the son of Robert, Mayor of Birmingham (1846–1847) and Jane Martineau. Five successive generations have served as Mayors of the city since the mid 19th century. born on the family estate on Bristol Road, now Martineau Gardens, Birmingham. A solicitor, he married Emily Kenrick (1838–1899), whose family was also part of Liberal Birmingham politics. Emily was the sister of Florence (1847–1875), whose marriage to Joseph Chamberlain bore a son, Neville, who became prime minister. Emily was also the cousin of William Kenrick MP. Their daughter, Clara Martineau, became the third woman to serve as a councillor on the Birmingham City Council, representing Edgbaston for 19 years.

Joseph Chamberlain was then the leader of the Liberal Unionists, and with his assistance Sir Thomas was instrumental in getting the Welsh Water Bill through Parliament and getting Birmingham made an assizes town. Like his father, Sir Thomas was also Mayor of Birmingham, holding office from 1884 to 1887, the year Queen Victoria was received by him when opening Birmingham's Victoria Law Courts. He was subsequently invited in 1887 to Windsor Castle, where he was knighted by the Queen. Sir Thomas thanked the Prince of Wales – "I have to thank your Royal Highness for drinking my health" – on the occasion of the opening of the Birmingham Law Courts in 1891. Lady Martineau and the Princess of Wales were also guests.

Sir Thomas, his wife Lady Martineau and his cousins, including Francis Martineau Lupton and David Martineau (1827–1911), president of the British and Foreign Unitarian Association, were, as Nonconformists, generous benefactors of Harris Manchester College, Oxford University of which, in 1893, Thomas's uncle James Martineau, was vice-president. James's son Russell (1831 - 1898) married Frances Bailey (1836–1921), a cousin of Joseph Chamberlain and aunt of Roedean founder Penelope Lawrence whose mother, Charlotte Augusta Bailey, was Chamberlain's first cousin. Second cousins Francis Martineau Lupton and David Martineau sent their daughters – Olive Middleton (née Lupton) and spinster sisters Lucy Martineau (1869–1952) and artist Sarah Madeleine Martineau (1872–1972) respectively – to board at Roedean which was initially favoured by wealthy Nonconformists such as the Martineaus. The sisters' brother was olympian Sydney Martineau.

Sir Thomas Martineau died on 28 July 1893 and is buried alongside his family at Key Hill Cemetery. Colonel Ernest Martineau (1861–1952), son of Sir Thomas, was Lord Mayor of Birmingham between 1912 and 1914; his first cousin, Neville Chamberlain, replacing him in this role in 1915.

Robert Francis (16 May 1831 – 15 December 1909), brother of Sir Thomas, was an alderman, secretary of the Birmingham and Midland Institute, chairman of the Technical School committee and trustee to Mason Science College which was attended by Philip Edgar Martineau (1859–1939), a founder of the Assistant Masters' Association and the son of Robert's second cousin, Francis Edgar Martineau (1828–1893). Robert was a member of the council of Mason's successor institution, the University of Birmingham. Robert and his family were the third generation of Martineaus to live at Highfield Road, Kings Norton, Edgbaston.

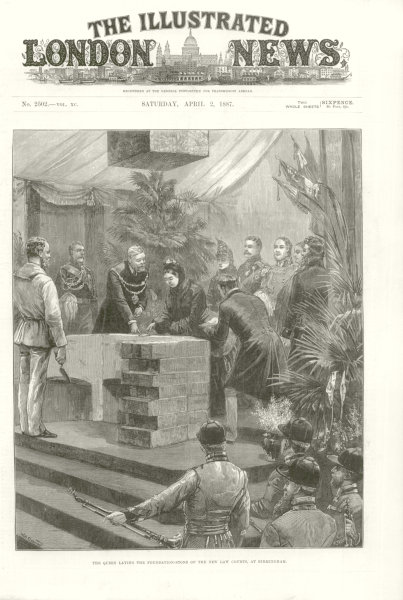
Front page of The Illustrated London News showing Sir Thomas Martineau, as Mayor of Birmingham, standing to the left of Queen Victoria who is laying the foundation stone of the new Victoria Law Courts, Birmingham, 1887

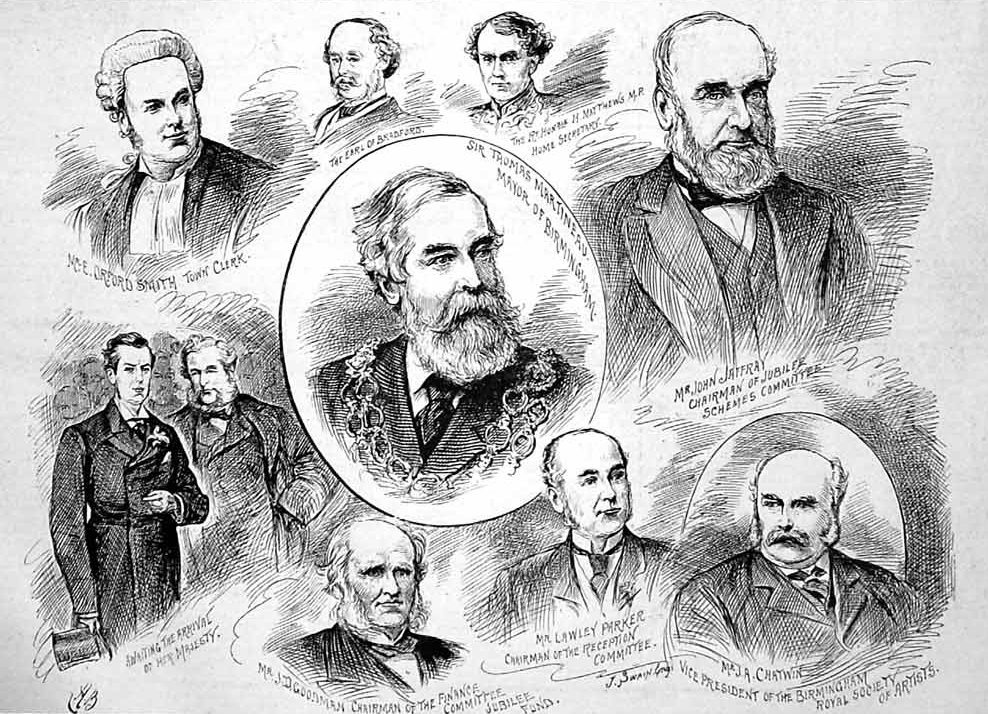
1887 artwork from The Illustrated Sporting and Dramatic News with Sir Thomas Martineau (centre) – "Awaiting The Arrival Of Her Majesty Queen Victoria"

== Sir William Martineau and family ==
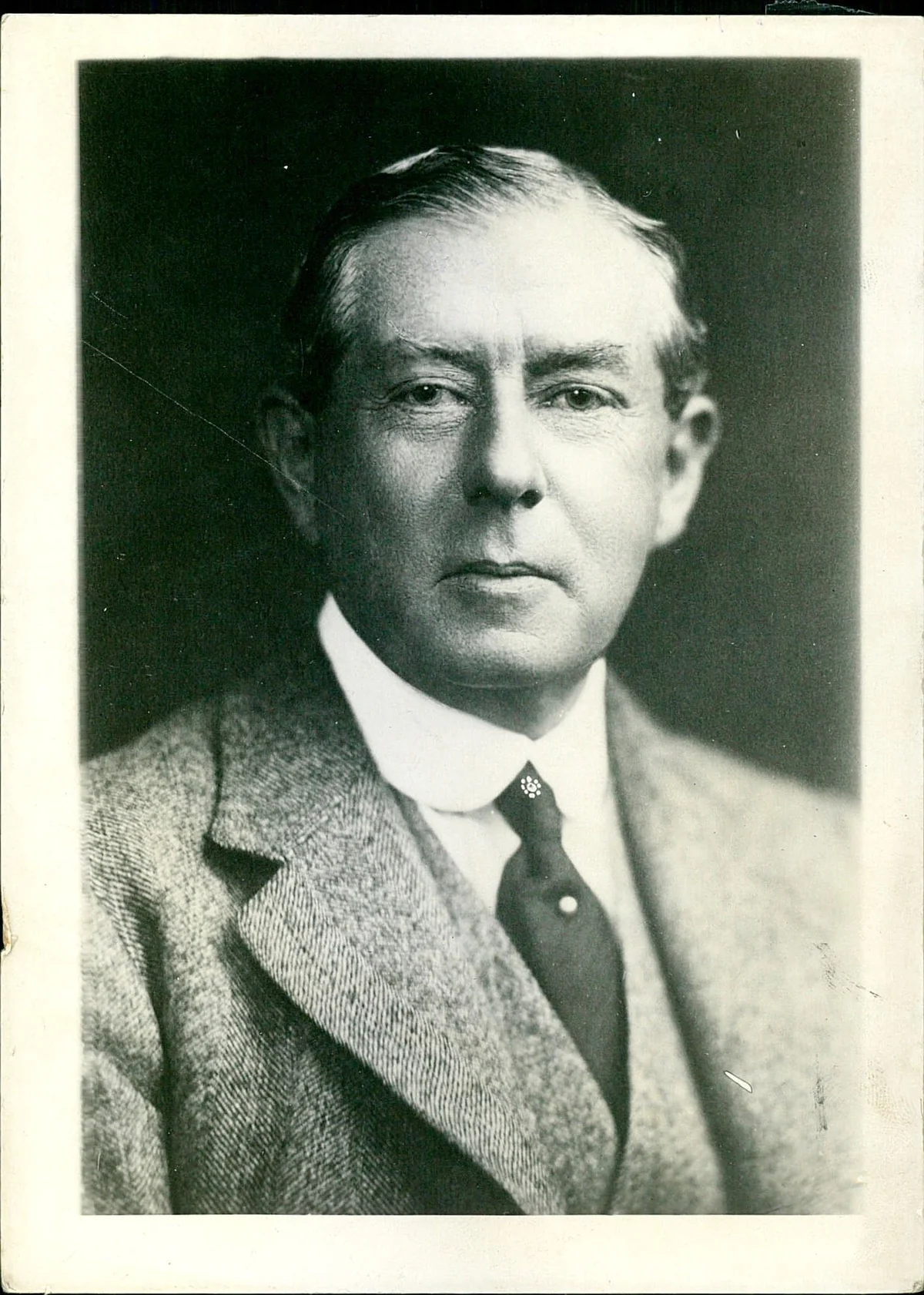
Sir William Martineau

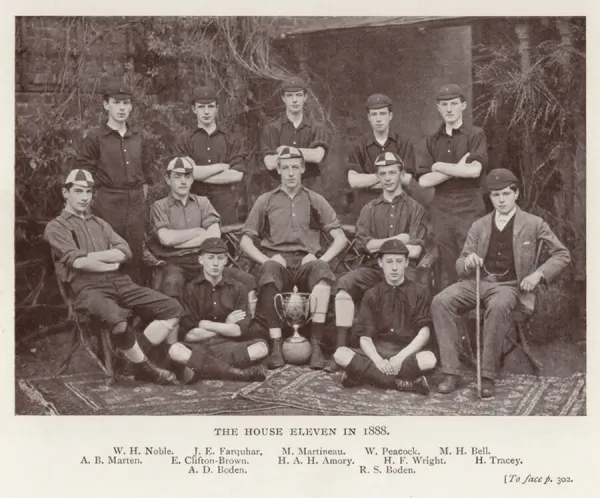
M. (Maurice Richard) Martineau (back row, centre) at Eton, 1888

Sir William Martineau (1866–1950) and Maurice Richard Martineau (1870–1943) were third cousins, being the great-great-grandsons of David Martineau II (1726–1768). Both were involved in the family brewing firms which, by the early 19th century had seen the Martineau family forming partnerships, including those with the Gurney family and Whitbread Brewery. William and Maurice Martineau both studied at Cambridge University in the 1880s. Sir William had previously studied at Uppingham and Maurice at Eton which his son, John Edmund Martineau, also attended. Maurice became a barrister and JP and in 1922, was a member of the Grand Jury for the West Suffolk Quarter Sessions as was his distant relative Col. the Hon. H.W. Lowry Corry. Sir William's early business life was spent in the family sugar refinery in London. After it was closed in 1895, he started a company for the manufacture of brewers' sugar. He was a justice of the peace and lived at Kincraig Castle, Ross-shire, Scotland at which he carried out much work. In 1947, he accompanied the Queen and her daughter Princess Elizabeth on a tour to South Africa. William's son Roderick Kilgour (1897 - 1937) married Rosemary Blanche Troubridge, daughter of Thomas Herbert Cochrane Troubridge, 4th Baronet and Laura Gurney; their son Roderick Robin Mackenzie (1926–2015) married Jean Leslie, daughter of Malcolm Leslie, 20th Earl of Rothes.

== Sir Philip Hubert Martineau and family ==
Son of Hubert Martineau (1821–1890) and great-great-grandson of David Martineau II (1726–1768), Philip was born in London in 1862 and was knighted in 1933 for his work as president of the Law Society of England and Wales. He was educated at Harrow and Trinity College, Cambridge. He was also a cricketer who played for Marylebone Cricket Club (MCC). He married Alice Vaughan-Williams (1865–1956) in 1888. An author, Lady Martineau published books on garden design. Sir Philip died in 1944. Their son, Hubert (1891–1976) was also a cricketer and organiser of his own team. He attended Eton.

== National and international interests ==
The intermarried Martineau and Lupton clan counted many aldermen and lord mayors, in both Birmingham and Leeds respectively, amongst their kin. Their Unitarian faith and Liberal (Unionist) political beliefs resulted in their combined commitment to many national concerns. For example, in the early 20th century, Sir Raymond Unwin's concept of the garden suburb greatly interested Robert Francis Martineau and his second cousin, Francis Martineau Lupton, both of whom were Aldermen.

International issues were also of great concern to the family; Robert Francis Martineau welcomed the abolitionist William Lloyd Garrison to his home when the American visited Birmingham on 7 July 1877 and two days later, Martineau's relative, Joseph Lupton, had Garrison as a guest at his Leeds house from 9–15 July.

== Lord Mayors of Birmingham ==
Members included five generations, father to son, of Mayors or Lord Mayors of Birmingham:

- Robert Martineau (1798–1870), Mayor of Birmingham, 1846–47
- Sir Thomas Martineau (1828–1893), Mayor of Birmingham, 1884–87
- Ernest Martineau (1861–1952), Lord Mayor of Birmingham, 1912–14
- Sir Wilfrid Martineau (1889–1964), Lord Mayor of Birmingham, 1940–41
- Denis Martineau (1920–1999), Lord Mayor of Birmingham, 1986–87

A blue plaque, erected in 2008 by the Birmingham Civic Society in the Council House, commemorates all five.

== Link to Catherine, Princess of Wales ==
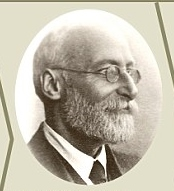
Francis Martineau Lupton, grandson of Elizabeth Greenhow (née Martineau), was the great-great-grandfather of Catherine, Princess of Wales.

Research revealed in 2014 that Catherine, Princess of Wales is a descendant of the Martineau family; her great-grandmother, Olive Middleton (née Lupton), was the daughter of Francis Martineau Lupton (1848–1921), who had attended political conferences in Birmingham with his Martineau alderman cousins. Olive Middleton's brother was named Lionel Martineau Lupton (1892–1916) in honour of their Martineau family heritage.

== Legacy ==
There is a society devoted to the Martineau family of Norwich. "Specifically, the Society aims to highlight the principles of freedom of conscience advocated in the nineteenth century by Harriet Martineau and her brother, Dr. James Martineau."

The National Portrait Gallery holds nearly 20 portraits of James and Harriet Martineau. Catherine, Princess of Wales, the gallery's patron, is a distant relative of them.

There was a school named after Sir Wilfrid Martineau, now subsumed within the International School, Birmingham.
