= Hickson =

Hickson is an English surname. Notable people with the surname include:

- Catherine Hickson (born 1955), Canadian volcanologist
- Charlie Hickson, American alleged UFO abductee
- Claude Hickson (1878–1948), New Zealand cricketer
- Darby Hickson, American graphic designer, wife of Karl Rove
- David Hickson (disambiguation), multiple people
- Ella Hickson (born 1985), British playwright
- Geoff Hickson (born 1939), English former football goalkeeper
- Ian Hickson, Swiss-British proponent of web standards
- Irene Hickson (1915–1995), catcher in the All-American Girls Professional Baseball League
- J.W.A. Hickson (1873–1956), Canadian psychologist and mountaineer
- JJ Hickson (born 1988), American basketball player
- Joan Hickson (1906–1998), British actress
- John Lawrence Hickson (1862–1920), English rugby union player
- John Hickson (cinematographer) (fl. 1928–1940), American cinematographer
- John Hickson (cricketer) (1864–1945), English first-class cricketer
- Joseph Hickson (1830–1897), Canadian railway executive
- Julie Hickson, American film producer and screenwriter
- Mabel Murray Hickson (1859–1922), English writer of short stories
- Michael Hickson (died 2020), quadriplegic who died of COVID-19
- Oswald Hickson (1877–1944), English lawyer
- Rebecca Hickson, New Zealand professor of animal science
- Samuel Hickson (fl. 1895–1903), English association footballer
- Simon Hickson, British comedian from duo Trevor and Simon
- Sydney J. Hickson (1859–1940), British zoologist
- William Edward Hickson (1803–1870), British educational writer

== See also ==
- Fraser-Hickson Library
- Hickson, North Dakota
- Hickson & Welch
- Hickson Compact Group
- William Hickson Barton
- Hixon (disambiguation)
- Hicks (disambiguation)
- Hick (disambiguation)
