= Greenhow (surname) =

Greenhow is a surname. Notable people with the surname include:

- Edward Headlam Greenhow (1814–1888), British physician
- Frances Lupton (née Greenhow; 1821–1892), English advocate for female education reform
- Robert Greenhow (1761–1840), American politician from Virginia
- Rose O'Neal Greenhow (1813/1814–1864), American Civil War Confederate spy
- Thomas Michael Greenhow (1792–1881), English physician
