= Hixon =

The name Hixon, Hixson or Hixton may refer to:

== Hixon ==
- Hixon (surname)
- Hixon, British Columbia, an unincorporated community in Canada
- Hixon, Staffordshire, a village and a civil parish in England
  - RAF Hixon, a Royal Air Force station in Hixon, Staffordshire
  - Hixon railway station
  - Hixon rail crash in 1968
- Hixon, Clark County, Wisconsin, a town in the United States
- Curtis Hixon Hall in Tampa, Florida, U.S.
- Curtis Hixon Waterfront Park in Tampa, Florida, U.S.
- Gideon C. Hixon House in La Crosse, Wisconsin, U.S.
- Hixon Green in Hove, East Sussex, UK
- Orval Hixon (1884-1982), photographer

== Hixson ==
- Hixson (surname)
- Hixson, Chattanooga, a formerly unincorporated community annexed as a neighborhood of Chattanooga, Tennessee
  - Hixson High School
- Hixson–Lied College of Fine and Performing Arts in Nebraska
- Hixson–Mixsell House, listed on the NRHP in Warren County, New Jersey
- Hixson–Skinner Mill Complex, listed on the NRHP in Warren County, New Jersey

== Hixton ==
- Hixton, Wisconsin (village)
- Hixton (town), Wisconsin

== See also ==
- Hickson (disambiguation)
