= Frances Lupton =

English educator

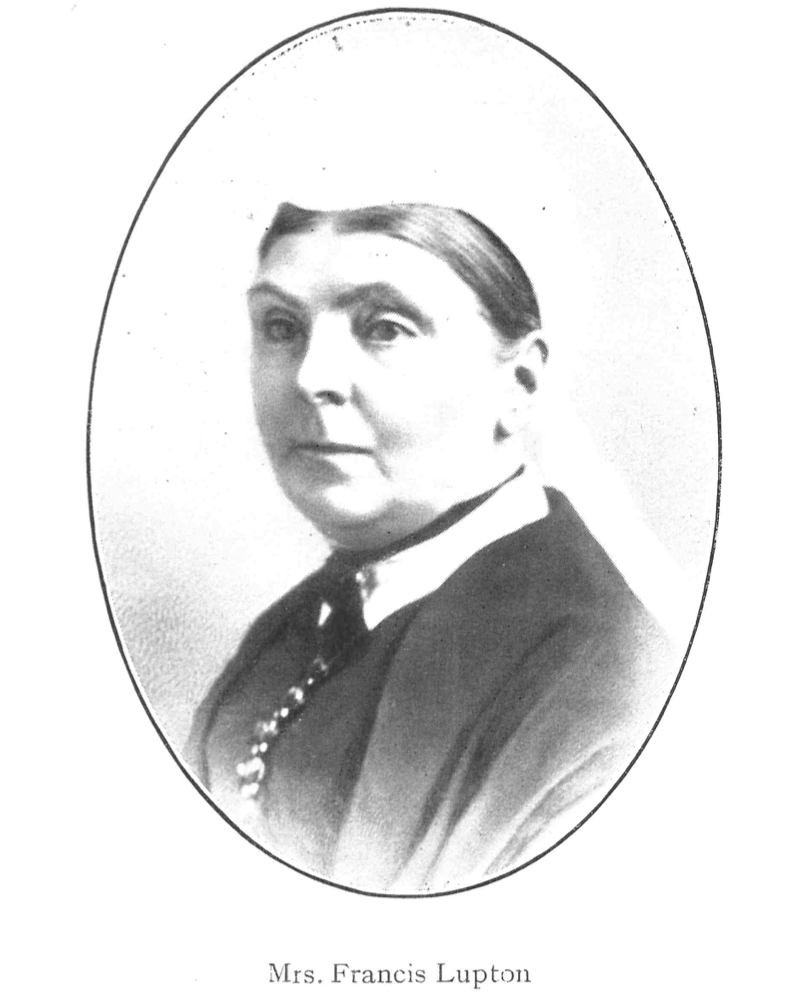
- Born: Frances Elizabeth Greenhow; 20 July 1821; Newcastle upon Tyne, England
- Died: 9 March 1892 (aged 70); Roundhay, Leeds, England
- Known for: Female education reform
- Spouse: Francis Lupton

Frances Elizabeth Lupton (née Greenhow; 20 July 1821 – 9 March 1892) was an education reformer who worked to open up educational opportunities for women. She married into the politically active Lupton family of Leeds, where she co-founded Leeds Girls' High School in 1876 and was the Leeds representative of the North of England Council for Promoting the Higher Education of Women.

== Early life ==
Lupton was born Frances Elizabeth Greenhow on 20 July 1821, into a medical family in Newcastle upon Tyne.

Her father, Thomas Michael Greenhow, co-founded the city's Eye Infirmary, with Sir John Fife, and then Newcastle University Medical School. He worked at Newcastle Infirmary, renamed the Royal Victoria Infirmary, for many years and was instrumental in its expansion in the 1850s.

Her mother, Elizabeth, was born into the Martineau family, an intellectual, business, and political dynasty. Many of her relatives were nationally prominent as Unitarians, a branch of English Dissenters; a main hall of the post-Blitz rebuilding of Essex Hall – the national headquarters for British Unitarians – was named after them. Elizabeth grew up in Norwich, attending the Octagon Chapel. Her siblings included James, the religious philosopher and professor at Manchester New College (known today as Harris Manchester College, Oxford University); Harriet, the social theorist and Whig writer, often cited as the first female sociologist; and Robert, Mayor of Birmingham.

Thomas and Elizabeth Greenhow lived in Newcastle's fashionable Old Eldon Square. The couple had several children; Frances and at least two boys. Henry Martineau Greenhow (1829–1912) followed his father into medicine. He joined the Indian Medical Service and spent his career in British India, rising to surgeon major. His garrison withstood the Siege of Lucknow, a key part of the Indian Rebellion of 1857. Another brother, William Thomas Greenhow (1831–1921) became a judge. The siblings' first cousin Edward Headlam Greenhow was a physician-academic, who made his mark in epidemiology and public health.

Frances was educated at her aunt Rachel Martineau's school and remained close to Rachel's sister Harriet in adulthood. The Unitarian ethos of liberalism and service to society stayed with her throughout her life.

== Marriage and children ==
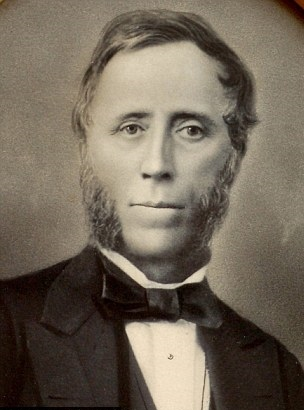
Frances married Francis Lupton in 1847

In 1847 Frances married Francis Lupton (1813–1884), a member of a prosperous and politically active cloth manufacturing family in Leeds. In addition to his business interests, he was one of the founders of the Yorkshire College of Science in 1874, which became part of the federal Victoria University, and from 1904 the University of Leeds. The Luptons were Unitarians who worshipped at Mill Hill Chapel on Leeds City Square, where a stained glass window commemorates them.

Frances married into a family of activists. Her husband's younger brother, Joseph Lupton, was president and later vice-president of Manchester New College, the training college for ministers where Frances's uncle taught. He was an anti-slavery campaigner and a Liberal who sat on the executive of the National Reform Union. He sat on the committee for the National Society for Women's Suffrage. The brothers' cousin Jane married the minister at Mill Hill, Charles Wicksteed, an educational reformer. He co-founded the Leeds Education Society, a precursor to the National Education League.

Francis and Frances lived just outside the rapidly industrialising city at Potternewton Hall, later moving to Beechwood, a Georgian country house in Roundhay. Francis had farms at Beechwood and worked as a director of the family wool manufacturing firm until he died suddenly at the age of 70 in 1884.

The Luptons had five sons, Francis Martineau, Arthur, Herbert (who died young), Charles, and Hugh. When her brother's wife died, she took in their daughter Mabel Greenhow to raise alongside her own children; Mabel grew up to write as Mrs Murray Hickson. Her four surviving sons contributed to the civic life of Leeds; two became Lord Mayor of Leeds. Through Olive Middleton (1881–1936), the eldest child of her eldest child Francis Martineau (1848–1921), Frances Lupton is the great-great-great-grandmother of Catherine, Princess of Wales.

== Female education reform ==
=== Context ===
Secular education of women became a more pressing issue by the mid-19th century. Girls' schools, including small boarding establishments, had existed for generations (for example Mary Wollstonecraft's school in Newington Green in the 1780s, with ties to Newington Green Unitarian Church and the Newington Academy for Girls, set up by Quakers in 1824), but a new impetus was given by the founding of colleges offering single-sex education to young women. Queen's College, London opened in London in 1848 to provide qualifications for governesses. The first girls' schools targeted at university entrance were North London Collegiate School (from 1850) and Cheltenham Ladies' College (from the appointment of Dorothea Beale in 1858). Emily Davies campaigned for women's higher education in the 1860s, and founded Girton in 1869, and Anne Clough founded Newnham in 1871 – both of these colleges were affiliated with but not entirely accepted by the University of Cambridge.

Lupton's aunt Harriet Martineau paid a visit to the United States in 1834, one of her areas of interest was the emerging girls' schools. In Society in America (1837), the sociologist criticised the state of female education:

"The intellect of women is confined by an unjustifiable restriction of ... education ... As women have none of the objects in life for which an enlarged education is considered requisite, the education is not given ... The choice is to either be ill-educated, passive, and subservient, or well-educated, vigorous, and free only upon sufferance."

=== Lupton's impact ===
Lupton's entry in the Oxford Dictionary of National Biography describes her pioneering work in expanding the opportunities for female education. In the early 1870s, Lupton invited England's leading educationalists to her home, Beechwood, including Anne Clough and Millicent Fawcett, first principal and co-founder of Newnham College, Cambridge, Meta Gaskell, Theodosia Marshall (1841-1892), Hannah Ford (1814-1886) and her daughters Emily and Isabella, James Bryce and John Seeley of Christ's College, Cambridge.

In 1871 Lupton became Honorary Secretary to the Ladies' Honorary Council of the Yorkshire Board of Education, which was just six years old. She was "the powerful driving force of the organisation" and along with Emily Ford established the Leeds Ladies' Educational Association.

By 1872, Lupton represented the Leeds Ladies' Educational Association on the North of England Council for Promoting the Higher Education of Women (NECPHEW). She also belonged to the Education for Girls Committee of the Royal Society of Arts which, from 1871, had aligned itself with the aims of NECPHEW. The most pressing need was for better all-round education for girls, equivalent to what boys received at traditional grammar schools. Established interests prevented the use of existing charitable funds, despite the passage of the Endowed Schools Act 1869, so Lupton led a meeting between the Leeds Association and the Ladies Council to create a new way forward – a joint-stock company. Her business acumen led to the establishment of Leeds Girls' High School in 1876. One of her first successes was setting up a students' library and the committees arranged to superintend the first Cambridge Local Examination for women in Leeds.

Lupton and the Ladies Council also saw the need for the dissemination of practical information on traditionally female subjects such as health and nursing. They launched a cookery school in 1874, having requested but not received help from civil servant Sir Henry Cole. In the following decade, the Yorkshire Training School of Cookery developed teacher training courses at the request of the school boards – eventually this formed a component of Leeds Metropolitan University.

Lupton alongside Mrs Henry Currer Briggs and Mrs F W Kitson established the Leeds branch of the Association for the Care and Protection of Friendless Girls in 1885 which was supported by members of her family.

== Death ==
Lupton died at home at Beechwood on 9 March 1892 and is buried at St John's Church in Roundhay.
