= Hixon (surname) =

Hixon is a surname. Notable people with the surname include:

- Brandon Hixon (1981–2018), American politician
- Camomile Hixon (born 1970), American visual artist
- Curtis Hixon (1891–1956), mayor of Tampa, Florida, U.S.
  - Curtis Hixon Hall in Tampa
  - Curtis Hixon Waterfront Park in Tampa
- David Hixon (born 1952), American college basketball coach
- Domenik Hixon (born 1984), American football wide receiver
- Dwayne Hixon, Montserratian politician
- Gideon Hixon (1826–1892), American politician and businessman
  - Gideon C. Hixon House in La Crosse, Wisconsin, U.S.
- Jack Hixon (1920 or 1921 – 2009), English football talent scout
- Ken Hixon, American screenwriter
- Lex Hixon (1941–1995), American Sufi author and poet
- Michael Hixon (born 1994), American diver
- Stan Hixon (born 1957), American football coach and former player
- Walter Hixon Isnogle, American impressionist artist
- William Hixon McDonald (senior) (1815–1869), Australian soldier-settler
- William Hixon McDonald (junior) (1840–1898), Australian miner and politician
- William S. Hixon (1848–1921), American grocer, soapstone manufacturer and politician

== See also ==
- Hixson (surname)
