= Robert Halliday Gunning =

Scottish surgeon, entrepreneur and philanthropist

Robert Halliday Gunning FRSE PRPSE FSA LLD (12 December 1818 – 22 March 1900) was a Scottish surgeon, entrepreneur and philanthropist. He did much to improve social conditions in Brazil and also became rich there. He endowed numerous prizes and awards including the Gunning Victoria Jubilee Prizes. The University of Edinburgh provides scholarships under the title of Gunning Victoria Jubilee Bursaries. He was a close friend of both Thomas Chalmers and Robert Christison.

== Life ==
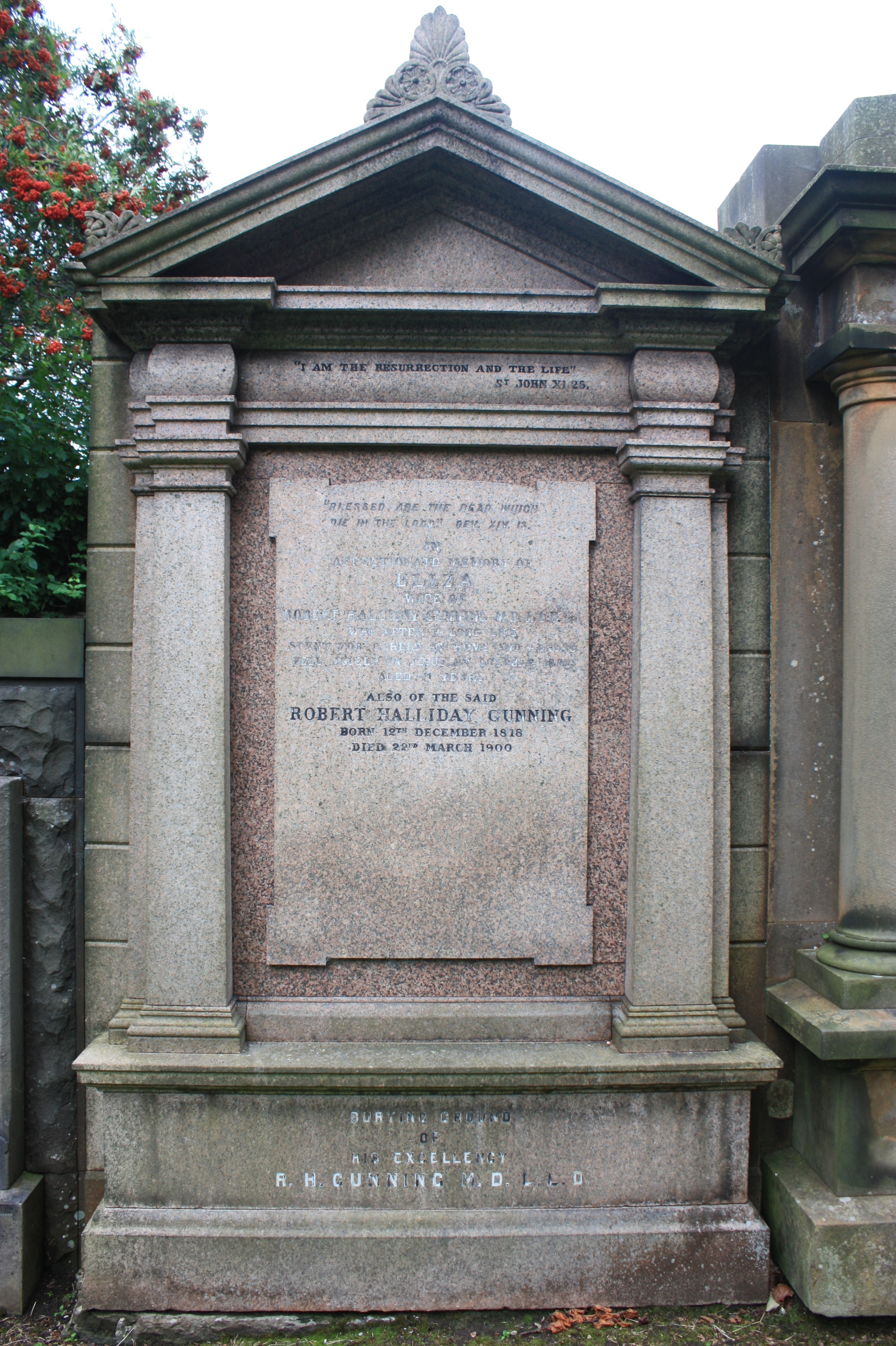
The grave of Robert Halliday Gunning, Grange Cemetery, Edinburgh

He was born Richard Halliday Gunnion on 12 December 1818 at Wood House in Ruthwell on the southern coast of Dumfriesshire. He was the eighth of ten children of Elizabeth Affleck McWilliam and James Gunnion. In 1822 the family moved to Kirkbean on the opposite side of the River Nith and later to New Abbey before settling in Dumfries. He was educated at the local school in Ruthwell then Dumfries Academy.

He studied medicine at the University of Edinburgh from around 1832. From 1835 he worked on the staff of Dumfries & Galloway Royal Infirmary. In 1839, aged 20, he was licensed to practice as a surgeon by the Royal College of Surgeons of Edinburgh. In 1840 he went to Marischal College in Aberdeen to act as Demonstrator to Professor Allen Thomson (a demonstrator performs surgery on cadavers whilst the professor lectures). In 1841 both Thomson and Gunning went to the University of Edinburgh, Thomson to take over as Professor of Physiology, Gunning to oversee the anatomy rooms under Professor Alexander Monro. Gunning was skilled, and in one of the world's most prestigious centres for the training of doctors in the mid-19th century. His pupils included William Tennant Gairdner, William Overend Priestley and Henry Duncan Littlejohn. The University granted him his doctorate (MD) in 1846.

In 1843, as a religious man, Gunning's world was rocked by the Disruption of the Church of Scotland which caused a split in the church, and in the allegiance of congregations. Gunning was an admirer of Rev Dr Thomas Chalmers who had led the split, and admired his vision of free schools, church missions etc. Gunning joined Chalmer's church in the West Port, Edinburgh rising to be a church elder. Gunning gave large sums to the church throughout his later life, including the full cost of a model lodging house attached to the church for housing the poor of the parish. In 1882 he laid the foundation stone to the replacement church on the corner of West Port and Lady Lawson Street: The Chalmers Territorial Free Church, seating over 900 persons, and paid for almost entirely by Gunning. At this same period, also through the influence of Chalmers and Robert Christison, he persuaded the University of Edinburgh to add the requirement for the study of at least one natural science into its theology degree, the University thereafter being one of the first universities to combine these two apparently diametrically opposed fields. In this, all felt that new discoveries in a science in no way undermined religion, and indeed science should be used as a means to back religious ideologies. Gunning paid for these extra lectures at his own expense, making it hard for the University to refuse.

From 1846 to 1848 he served as president of the Royal Physical Society of Edinburgh. During this period he lived at 12 Argyll Square, close to the University, and following his marriage in 1847 he moved to a larger house at 43 George Square.

Following in the footsteps of Robert Mortimer Glover, the more recognised James Young Simpson, and the overtly practical Francis Brodie Imlach, Gunning undertook experiments on the use and safety of chloroform during 1847/8. Gunning was firmly in the Glover camp: that chloroform was too dangerous for use on humans for full anaesthesia (Imlach used only partial anaesthesia, for dental extractions, perhaps the most logical use). In May 1848 he presented his findings to the Medico-Chirurgical Society of Edinburgh and was critical of Simpson's advocacy of human use. Simpson (there present) defended his beliefs. However, public opinion, including a knighthood for Simpson and widespread media coverage, dominated the feelings of the general public. Medical truth was therefore suppressed and the use of chloroform spread widely, much to the delight of Dr James Duncan of Duncan & Flockhart of Edinburgh, who held the British licence for production. Gunning's experiments confirmed those of Glover (who had already left Britain in his disgust of Simpson's plagiarism of his own work, Simpson being the official reader of Glover's university thesis on the subject). Gunning also established that Simpson had undertaken no systematic experimentation whatsoever. Gunning equally became disillusioned at his own profession.

As a combination of these factors, and apparent health problems, he and his new wife left Britain and emigrated to Brazil for a different life. He kept in regular written contact with his friend Robert Christison, and sent him supplies of Ipecacuanha from Brazil, this being the basis of a drug used to treat dysentery. The two hatched a scheme to grow the plant in India to treat many cases there without need for such transport distances.

Gunning set up home, and a medical practice, in Rio de Janeiro. He also began investing in various ventures including gold mines and creating a railway system across Brazil (mainly on the coast-line). He also created the first street-car (tram) system in Rio. In 1872 he moved to Palmeiras to be closer to his mining interests. Here he was visited by notable persons such as Louis Agassiz who sought (and gained) funding for his projects. Gunning's investments proved lucrative. His already great wealth grew. Emperor Dom Pedro II of Brazil created him a Grand Dignitary of the Empire of Brazil and awarded him the Order of the Rose, for his work in improving the lives of the poor of Brazil. Dom Pedro wrote to Queen Victoria asking that this be recognised in Britain and this was agreed. He was afterwards entitled to the title "His Excellency Robert Gunning". His wife died in 1877 and is buried in Edinburgh. He returned to Britain in 1882 as a millionaire.

In 1882 he was elected a Fellow of the Royal Society of Edinburgh. His proposers were William Alison, John Hutton Balfour, Rev John Duns, Andrew Douglas Maclagan and Sir William Turner. He donated a large sum to the Society to fund the Gunning Victoria Jubilee Prize.

He went blind around 1890. He died at 12 Addison Crescent in Kensington, London on 22 March 1900. His body was taken to Edinburgh for burial in the Grange Cemetery with his first wife, Eliza, following a memorial service at West Port Church. The grave is against the eastern boundary wall around 50m from the main entrance.

== Family ==
He was married twice: firstly in 1847 to Eliza Meikle (died 1877) of Springfield House, Govan; secondly, in old age in 1890, to Lady Mary Agnes Winwood Hughes, 30 years his junior. She was the daughter of Sir William Smith, 3rd Baronet and widow of Sir Thomas Collingwood Hughes, 8th Baronet.

He had no children by either marriage.

== Publications ==
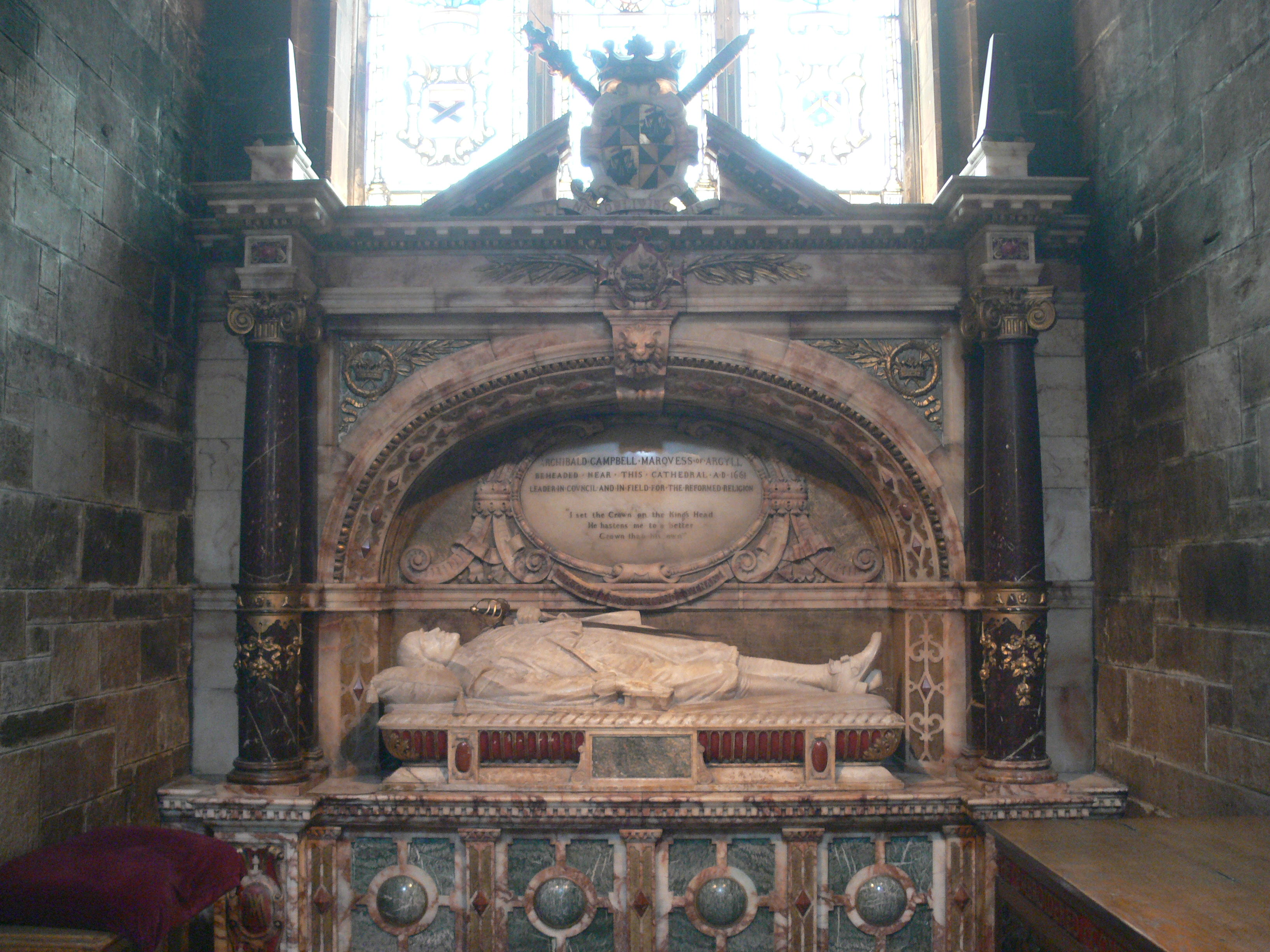
The Marquess of Argyll Tomb in St Giles

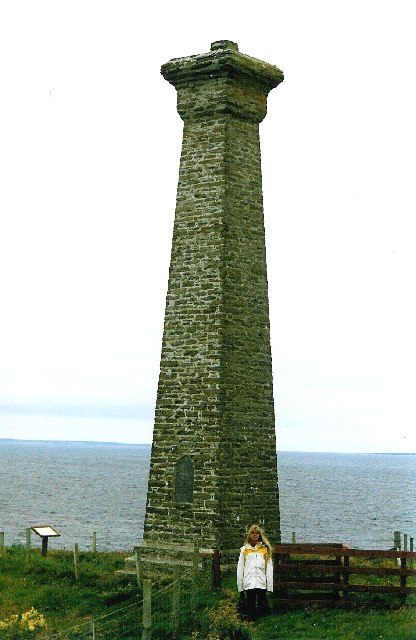
Covenanters' Memorial, Deerness. A memorial to 200 covenanters who drowned when their prison ship foundered in a storm.

- The Nature and Treatment of Pulmonary Consumption (1846)
- The Physiological Action of Chloroform (1848)

== Prizes Funded by Gunning ==
Over and above the Gunning Victoria Jubilee Prizes, awarded by both the Royal Society of Edinburgh and the Society of Antiquaries of Scotland, Gunning funded 13 ongoing bursaries jointly known as the Gunning Victoria Jubilee Bursaries but each having their own name (concealing the Gunning connection). These are often erroneously assumed to be founded by the persons after whom they are named, but all are founded by Gunning:

- The Alison Prize for Community Medicine (named after William Alison)
- The Bell Prize for Physiology (named after the brothers Charles and John Bell)
- The Joseph Black Prize for Chemistry (named after Joseph Black)
- The Christison Prize for Pharmacology (named after his best friend Robert Christison)
- The Edward Forbes Prize for Zoology (named after Edward Forbes)
- The Gregory Prize for the Practice of Physic (Medicine) (named after James Gregory)
- The Hutton Balfour Prize for Botany (named after John Hutton Balfour)
- The Lister Prize for Surgery (named after Joseph Lister, 1st Baron Lister)
- The Maclagan Prize for Forensic Medicine (named after Andrew Douglas Maclagan)
- The Monro Prize for Anatomy (named after his mentor and friend Dr Alexander Monro)
- The Thomson Prize for Pathology (named after his mentor Prof James Thomson)
- The Simpson Prize for Obstetrics (named after James Young Simpson)... this latter prize clearly has an irony given his conflict with Simpson, it perhaps was intended to convey (within the closed medical world) that he saw Simpson's contribution as extending no further than the field of Obstetrics.
- The Cullen Victoria Jubilee Prize (a very large bursary named after Prof William Cullen)

== Other Philanthropic Works ==
Gunning paid for various works in St Giles Cathedral in Edinburgh including the plaque to Jenny Geddes in 1886 and the magnificent faux-medieval tomb to the Marquess of Argyll (erected 1895).

In 1886, Gunning paid for the bulk of the cost of the Covenanters Memorial at Deerness.
