= Robert Mortimer Glover =

English physician

Dr Robert Mortimer Glover FRSE (1815-1859) was an English physician. In 1838 he co-founded the Paris Medical Society and served as its first Vice President. He won the Medical Society of London’s Fothergill Gold Medal in 1846 for his lecture "On the Pathology and Treatment of Scrofula". Some 5 years prior to James Young Simpson’s use of chloroform on human patients in 1842 Glover discovered its anaesthetic qualities on laboratory animals. He is sometimes called "the true discoverer of chloroform". In an ironic twist of fate he died from a chloroform overdose. Perkins-McVey argues that Glover further discovered "a new order of poisonous substances," with Glover "for the first time, proposing the existence of a unique chemical class of anaesthetic compounds, not merely by their perceived physiological effects, but by their common chemical structure, finding that 'the chemical and physiological relations of the group of halogenous elements and their compounds are in strict accordance'".

== Life ==
He was born in South Shields on 2 November 1815 to Catherine and William Glover, a merchant. In 1829 he was apprenticed to Thomas J. Aitken TRCSE of 31 Nicolson Street in Edinburgh. He began studying medicine at the University of Edinburgh the following year, and was clerked to Prof James Syme at the Edinburgh Royal Infirmary. In 1834 he travelled to Geneva in Switzerland to study under Prof Lombard. In 1835 he was elected a member of the Medical Society of Edinburgh. In 1837 he received his licence to practice medicine and travelled to Paris, founding the Paris Medical Society the following year and serving as its first Vice President.

He returned briefly to Newcastle-upon-Tyne in 1839 before again heading to Edinburgh in 1840. This was to defend his thesis "On the Physiological and Medical Properties of Bromine and its Compounds" from which he then received his doctorate (MD). He then returned to Newcastle to stay with his brother William Glover who was also a doctor, operating from 12 Northumberland Street. He joined the Newcastle School of Medicine and Practical Sciences, serving as Chairman of the Department of Chemistry and Head of the Department of Materia Medica and Therapeutics.

In 1842 he won the Gold Medal of the Harveian Society for his thesis on the properties of chloroform and bromine, including the first description of the anaesthetic effects of chloroform (injected into the neck of a dog). The paper acknowledged the potential effects upon the heart (including potential death). He omitted to spot its potential use during surgery. Glover later wrote to James Young Simpson, decrying Simpson's failure to credit his own contributions. Simpson answered that he did not follow "animal experiments". However, as Simpson was one of the university assessors of Glover's thesis (which contained the same theories) this claim seems a little hollow. Simpson should have read his thesis even if he claimed he had not. Simpson's use on humans is generally described as "the first" and this is technically correct, if perhaps obfuscating other factors. It equally belittles the contribution of Simpson's dentist neighbour, Francis Brodie Imlach, who used chloroform in clinical conditions to extract a tooth (perhaps its safest use) on 11 November 1847, and equally deserves more recognition. Glover's findings were confirmed by Dr Robert Halliday Gunning in May 1848, also disproving Simpson's theories on the reasons for the effects of chloroform.

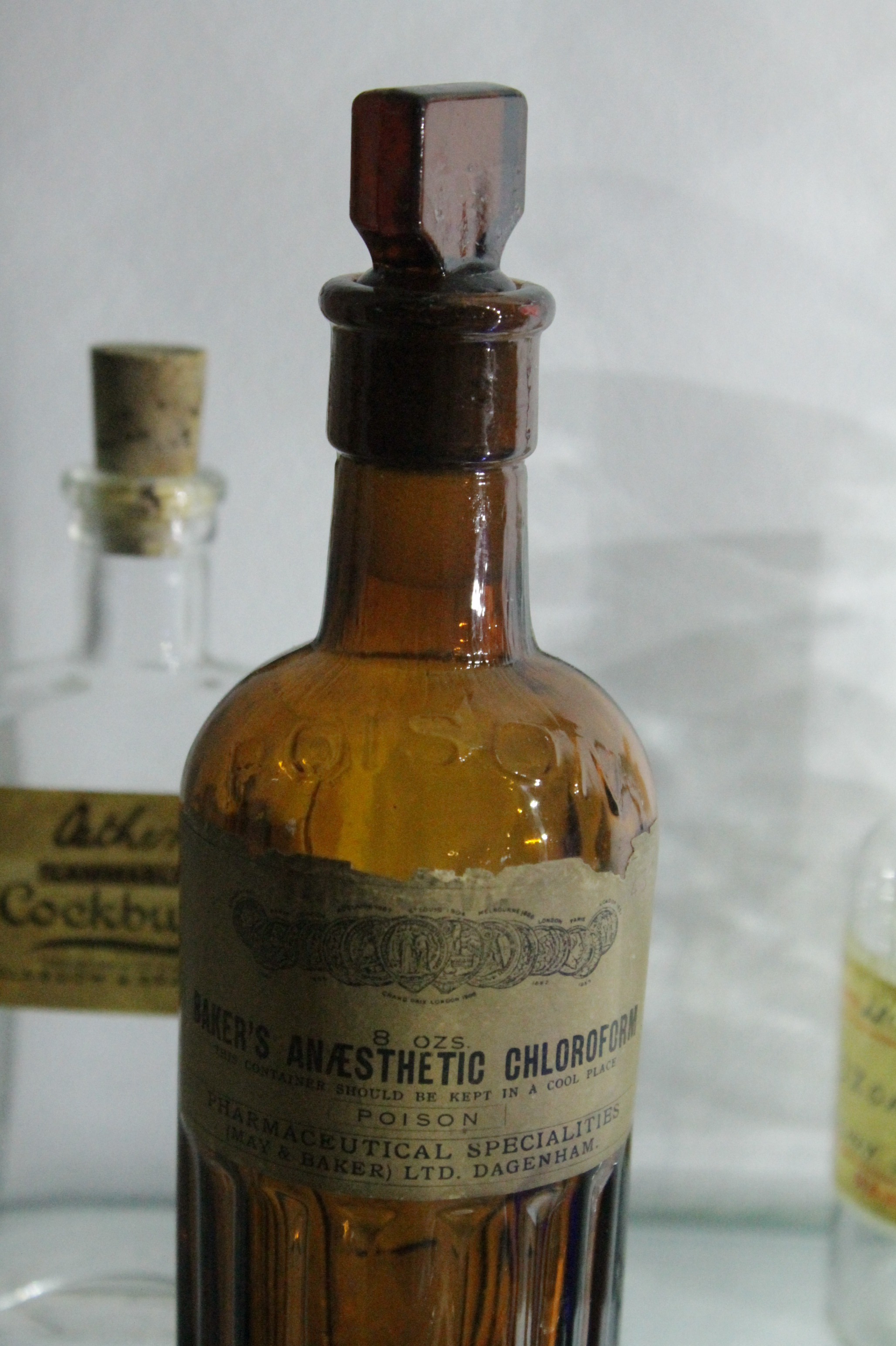
Early chloroform bottle, Hunterian Museum, Glasgow

In 1848 Glover assisted Prof John Fife at Newcastle Infirmary in the autopsy of 15 year old Hannah Greener, who had died under the effects of chloroform whilst having an infected toenail removed. She was the first human death from chloroform.

In 1850 he was elected a Fellow of the Royal Society of Edinburgh his proposer being Sir Robert Christison.

In the summer of 1851 the Newcastle School of Medicine was dissolved following various arguments over rent owed to the North Eastern Railway Company and moves to be absorbed by Durham University. Glover and Dawson set up a new school, whilst the majority of teachers ran a rival school under the umbrella of Durham University. The two factions reunited in 1857 after Glover had left Newcastle.

Late in 1854 he appears at the Royal Free Hospital in London under the name of Mortimer Glover, living at 2 Tavistock Place off Russell Square. Here he worked with Frederick James Gant and Thomas Wakley. He was reprimanded for failure to receive his London licence to practice (LRCP, Licentiate of the Royal College of Physicians, a historical medical diploma) and being slack in clinical duties. He asked for a leave of absence in April 1855. Together with Gant he volunteered to join the medical staff in the Crimea, also attracted by the very large stipend of £1500 per annum.

On 25 April 1855 they sailed on HMS Candia reaching Scutari on 26 May 1855. Gant and Glover were amongst the five civilian surgeons working at the Barracks at Scutari. Glover caught dysentery here and began taking doses of opium and chloroform to deal with this. Civil surgeons and military surgeons did not mix well and the civil surgeons were dispensed of prior to the end of the war. Gant and Glover left in January 1856 having been of little practical purpose. Gant returned to the Royal Free Hospital but Glover did not, neither did he resign. His name disappears from their records in 1856.

In July 1856 he at last passed his LRCP.

His health deteriorated after his time serving in the Crimean War at which point he became addicted to both opium and chloroform. Destitute and unable to work, he took lodgings with a Mr Walter Rochfort a pharmacist, at 1 Kensington Park Gardens in Notting Hill, London.

Sadly Glover died from an overdose of chloroform at 1 Kensington Park Road in London, taken on 9 April 1859. His friend Frederick James Gant and Mt Rochfort were with him when he died the following day, 10 April. Setting aside Horace Wells’ chloroform-assisted suicide, he was the first professional to die purely from the use (or abuse) of chloroform.

His friend Gant performed an autopsy on 11 April, a horrible task on a friend. He found 4 pints (2 litres) of bloody mucus in his guts, smelling of chloroform. He was estimated to have taken a liquid dose of 2 to 5 ounces of pure chloroform (60-150ml). His enlarged liver indicated long-term abuse predating Crimea. Thomas Wakley oversaw the inquest of his death, acting both as a former friend and coroner of Middlesex at the time. He was also editor of The Lancet at the time. His brother William Glover attended as did Gant, Hopton and a J. Millar. A verdict of "accidental death by excessive use of chloroform taken as a sedative" was found, it being concluded not as a deliberate suicide.

He was buried in Hanwell Cemetery in an unmarked grave on 14 April 1859.

== Publications ==
- The Applications of Chemistry to Medicine (1842)
- Remarks on the History of the Literary and Philosophical Society of Newcastle (1844)
- Anaesthetic and Other Therapeutic Effects of the Inhalation of Chloroform (Monthly Journal of Medical Sciences, 1847) *predating Simpson's "discovery"
- Anaesthetic Properties of the Dutch Liquid (1851)
- Anaesthesia and Anaesthetic Agents (1852)
- National Defence, a Letter (1853)
- A Manual of Elementary Chemistry (1855)
- On Mineral Waters: Their Physical and Medicinal Properties (1857)
- The New Medical Act: with Explanatory Notes for the Guidance of the Medical Practitioner and Student (1858)
- On the Philosophy of Medicine

== Other Notable Events ==
In May 1853, he applied his knowledge of chemistry to a different field, lodging a patent for an arsenic-based paint for the hulls of ships to prevent the growth of barnacles and algae.

On 10 March 1859, shortly before his death, in a very strange act, Glover married Sarah Hickson a 36 year old seamstress who had escaped from Colney Hatch Asylum (allegedly where the word "booby hatch" comes from). This was Britain's largest mental asylum, and she had been there for seven years for "violent and dangerous behaviour". She was also from Newcastle and they had met through her friend Rochfort. As she was described as "lunatic as himself" (himself meaning Glover) this attests to Glover's mental state in his final months. They honeymooned for a week at a hotel at 30 Charles Street in Westminster before she was recaptured and escorted back to Colney Hatch.
