= Sidney Kitcat =

English cricketer (1868–1942)

Personal information
- Full name: Sidney Austyn Paul Kitcat
- Born: 20 July 1868; Tetbury, Gloucestershire
- Died: 17 June 1942 (aged 73); Esher, Surrey
- Batting: Right-handed
- Bowling: Right-arm medium-pace

Domestic team information
- Years: Team
- 1890–1904: Gloucestershire

Career statistics
Competition	First-class
Matches	54
Runs scored	1899
Batting average	21.82
100s/50s	0/10
Top score	95*
Balls bowled	725
Wickets	14
Bowling average	34.35
5 wickets in innings	0
10 wickets in match	0
Best bowling	2/0
Catches/stumpings	38/–
- Source: Cricinfo, 3 March 2020

Sidney Austyn Paul Kitcat (20 July 1868 – 17 June 1942) was an English cricketer. He played for Gloucestershire between 1890 and 1904.

== Life ==
Sidney Kitcat was the seventh child and third son of the Reverend David Kitcat, Rector of Westonbirt, near Tetbury, Gloucestershire.

He was educated at Marlborough College, where he captained the First XI in 1886. After an incident in a school match when he was controversially dismissed, the Marylebone Cricket Club changed the Laws of Cricket to make it illegal for a bowler to bowl consecutive overs. W. G. Grace saw Kitcat playing for Marylebone Cricket Club and asked him to join Gloucestershire, Grace's county team. He played as an amateur, fitting county matches in when the demands of his business allowed. His highest score was 95 not out against Middlesex at Lord's in 1897. Against Sussex in 1896, he and Grace, who made 301, added 193 for the ninth wicket; Kitcat made 77 not out.

He was also an international hockey player. In 1896 he married a widow, Mabel Murray Hickson, a writer of short stories.
