= Thomas Michael Greenhow =

British doctor (1792–1881)

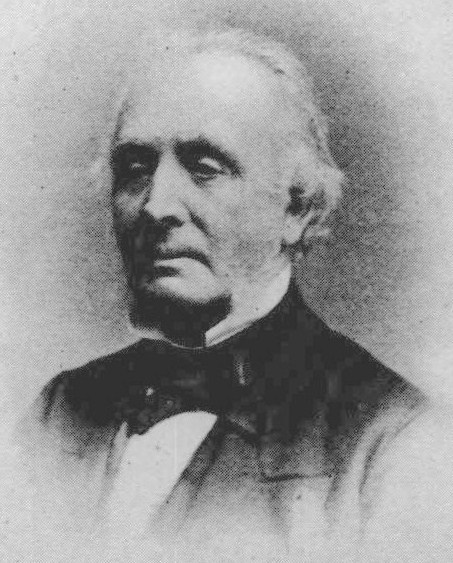
Greenhow in 1880

Thomas Michael Greenhow MD MRCS FRCS (5 July 1792 – 25 October 1881) was an English surgeon and epidemiologist.

== Career ==
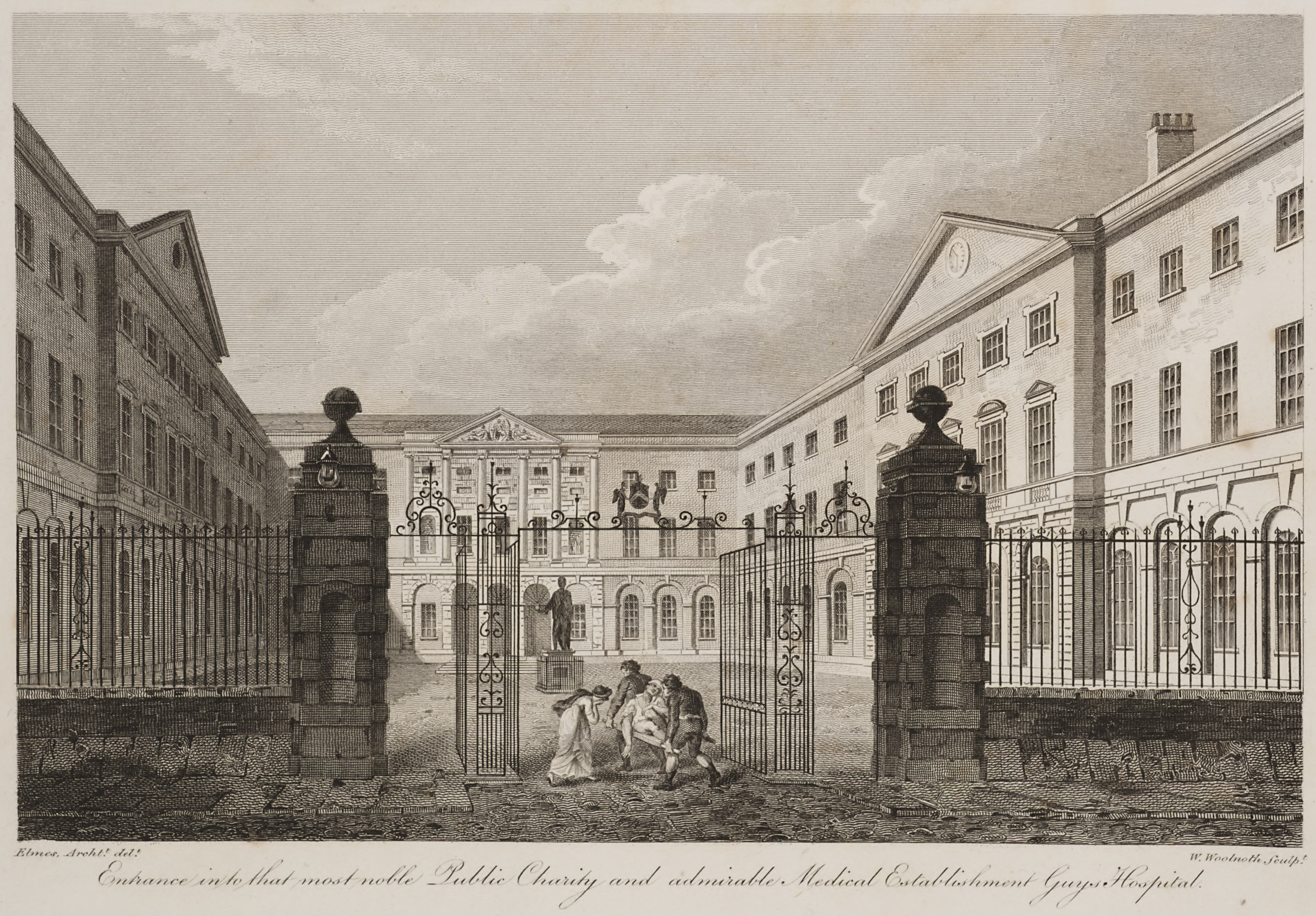
Greenhow studied at Guy's and St Thomas's Hospitals

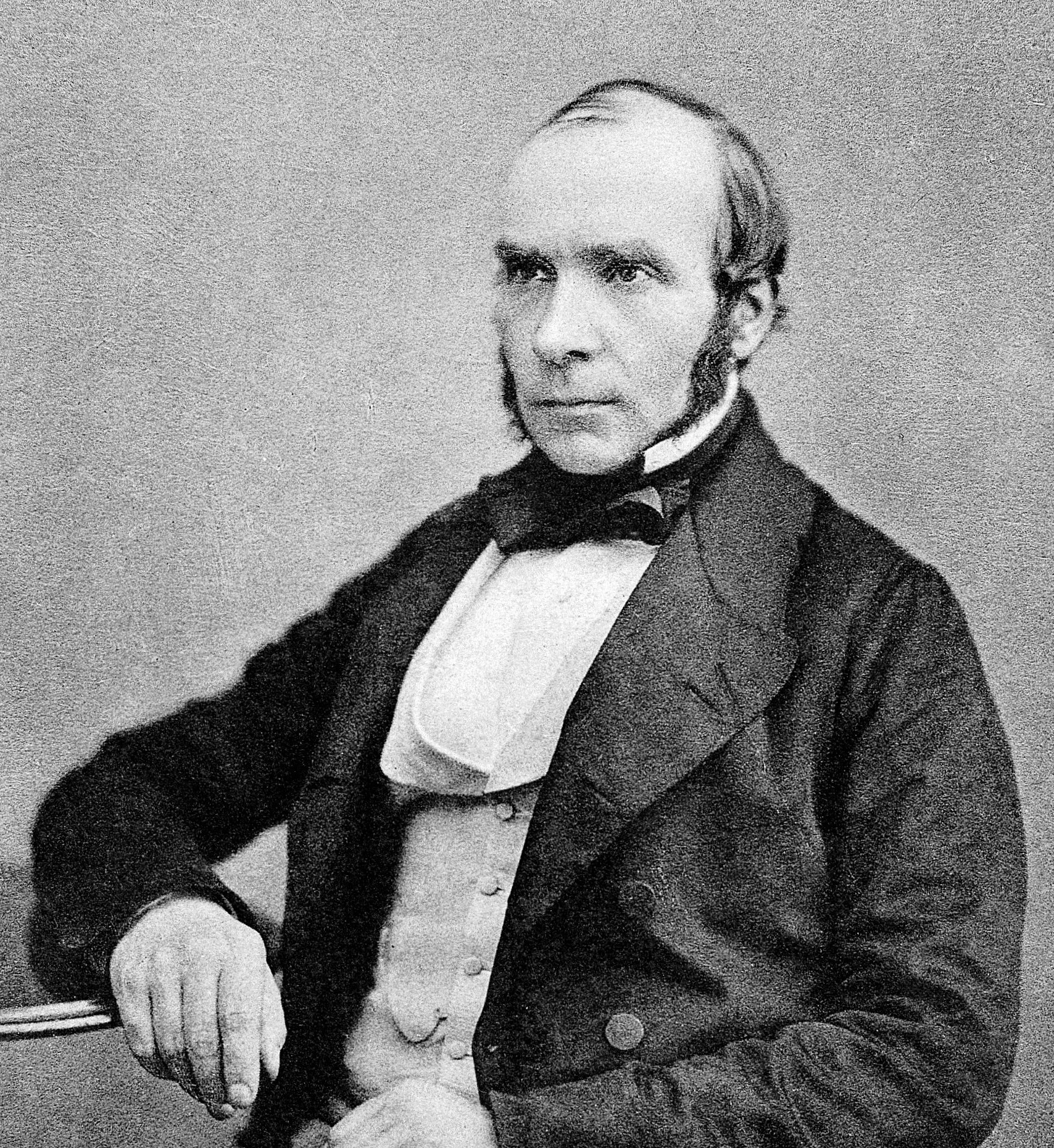
Greenhow and Queen Victoria's anaesthetist, John Snow (above) undertook "dedicated research" on the cholera pandemics of the Victorian era

Greenhow was the second son of Edward Martin Greenhow, an army surgeon from North Shields. He was a medical graduate of the University of Edinburgh and became MRCS (London) in 1814, having been a surgery student at London's Guy's and St Thomas's Hospitals.

Greenhow spent much of his working life in Newcastle. He and fellow surgeon Sir John Fife are recorded together in 1827 as being Eminent Persons of Newcastle and Gateshead. Greenhow's surgical inventions were heralded by London surgeons in the 1830s. Debrett's records that Greenhow was a Fellow of the Royal College of Surgeons of England, having become, in 1843, one of the original 300 fellows.

Greenhow worked in all areas of surgery and had a particular interest in obstetrics and gynaecology; in 1845, he controversially published detailed accounts regarding his views on the gynaecological status of Harriet Martineau, who was both his patient and sister-in-law.

Greenhow was a pioneer in the establishment of the Durham University and in 1855 was a lecturer at the Newcastle's Medical College, in connection with Durham University. He and Sir John Fife founded what would become the Newcastle University College of Medicine. The two men also founded Newcastle's Eye Infirmary. Greenhow worked as the senior surgeon at the Newcastle Infirmary, later renamed the Royal Victoria Infirmary, for many years and was instrumental in its expansion in the 1850s. While working there, he trained John Snow. Greenhow and Snow both advocated for the usage of chloroform when performing major surgery and undertook "dedicated research" to end the London cholera pandemic. Greenhow's son, surgeon Henry Martineau Greenhow, reported in The Lancet his father's surgical success involving chloroform.

Greenhow and his nephew, physician Edward Headlam Greenhow, undertook much research into medical hygiene and public health, publishing papers throughout the 1850s warning of further impending cholera pandemics. The archives of King's College London hold an 1866 letter from E. H. Greenhow concerning the 1849 cholera breakout in Manchester, with which both men were greatly involved. The Lancet records that at a meeting in 1855 of the Epidemiological Society of London, John Snow responded to a paper being read out by Edward Headlam Greenhow in which the research of his uncle, Thomas Michael Greenhow, concerning the 1831–32 cholera epidemic in Tynemouth was outlined. On 6 May 1856, Thomas Greenhow delivered a lecture on this topic at his alma mater, St Thomas' Hospital, where Snow was working as an anaesthetist. In October 1856, Edward Headlam Greenhow became Lecturer on Public Health at St Thomas'.

Thomas Greenhow retired to Leeds in 1860, dying there on 25 October 1881 at Newton Hall.

== Family ==
Greenhow's first wife was Elizabeth Martineau (1794–1850), who succumbed to tuberculosis after producing four children. She was a daughter of Thomas Martineau and Elizabeth Rankin, of the prosperous, socially reformist Martineau family, mainly based in Birmingham. His wife's siblings included the religious philosopher James Martineau and the sociologist and political theorist Harriet Martineau. Greenhow's sister Sarah (1801–1891) married George Martineau (1792–1857), cousin of his wife Elizabeth.

Greenhow's first child and only daughter, Frances, was born in 1821. She married into the Lupton family of Leeds, wealthy wool manufacturers and Unitarians, a branch of English Dissenters. She worked to open up educational opportunities for women, and, more prominently, their access to universities. Her eldest son's first daughter was Olive Christiana Middleton (née Lupton), the great-grandmother of Catherine, Princess of Wales.

Greenhow's first son and second child, Edward Meadows Greenhow, (1822–1840) died at the age of 18. His second son, Henry Martineau Greenhow (1829–1912), followed his father into medicine. He studied at University College London, and by 1854, he was a Member of the Royal College of Surgeons of England. He joined the Indian Medical Service spending his entire career in British India, and rising to surgeon major. He married Jessie, daughter of Thomas Lombe Taylor. Their son Wilfred Harry Greenhow (1872–1950) went to Marlborough College and Exeter college, Oxford MA. Wilfred's daughter Anita Diana (1917–1991) married Walter Julian Algernon Boyle, grandson of Henry Boyle 5th Earl Shannon. Greenhow's third and youngest son, Judge William Thomas Greenhow (1831–1921) received his Bachelor of Laws at Somerset House at King's College London in 1853. He married his second cousin Marion, eldest daughter of Charles Martineau. They had a daughter, Mabel.

In 1854 at Leeds' Mill Hill Chapel, Greenhow married his second wife, Anne (1812–1905), daughter of William Lupton, the father-in-law of Greenhow's daughter Frances Lupton.
