= Mabel Murray Hickson =

English writer (1859–1922)

Mabel Murray Hickson, née Mabel Greenhow (2 February 1859, Esher – 12 November 1922, Esher), was an English writer of short stories.

She was born in Esher into a medical family with roots in Newcastle. Her father was Judge William Thomas Greenhow (1831-1921) and her grandfather was Thomas Michael Greenhow, co-founder of the city's Eye Infirmary and Newcastle University Medical School. He worked at the Newcastle Infirmary, later renamed the Royal Victoria Infirmary, for many years and was instrumental in its expansion in the 1850s.

On the death of her mother Marion née Martineau in 1864 (by her own hand) when she was a toddler, Mabel was taken into the home of her paternal aunt Frances Greenhow (1821-1892) and her husband Francis Lupton (1813–1884). The Lupton family was a prosperous mercantile dynasty in Leeds; Francis was not only a manufacturer, but a banker and magistrate, and chairman of the finance committee of the Yorkshire College of Science, later the University of Leeds. His wife Frances was the niece of writers and reformers Harriet and Dr James Martineau; her entry in the Oxford Dictionary of National Biography focuses on her pioneering work expanding opportunities for female education, not least in co-founding Leeds Girls' High School. Mabel grew up at the family seat of Beechwood, a Georgian country house in Roundhay, a village just outside Leeds. She was raised alongside her cousins Francis Martineau, Arthur, Charles, and Hugh, all of whom contributed to the eminence of the city from Victorian times through to World War II.

She married Robert Murray Hickson in 1884 (he died aged 29 in 1885). After publishing a short novel, A Latter-Day Romance, in 1893, Hickson became a prolific contributor of stories to periodicals of the 1890s. Upon her second marriage in 1896 to Sidney Austyn Paul Kitcat (a first class cricketer, who played county cricket for Gloucestershire and club cricket for Esher), she became Mabel Greenhow Kitcat, though she continued to write under the name Mrs Murray Hickson.

== Works ==
- A Latter-Day Romance, 1893
- Shadows of Life, 1898
- Concerning Teddy, 1899
