= Edward Headlam Greenhow =

English physician, epidemiologist, sanitarian, statistician, clinician and lecturer

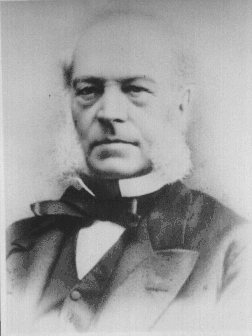

Edward Headlam Greenhow FRS FRCP (1814 – 22 April 1888) was an English physician, epidemiologist, sanitarian, statistician, clinician and lecturer.

== Life and career ==
Greenhow was born at North Shields in 1814, and after receiving his medical education at Edinburgh and Montpellier, he joined his father in practice in that town. His grandfather, father and uncle, Thomas Michael Greenhow, were all physicians. Initially a surgeon, Greenhow and his uncle Thomas were both members of the North of England Medical Association; Edward being president in 1841. Edward Headlam Greenhow practiced for eighteen years in Newcastle-upon-Tyne, and did much work on sanitation, becoming a member of the Town Council of Tynemouth and chairman of the Board of Health.

In 1852 Greenhow graduated as M.D. at King's College, University of Aberdeen, and in 1853 established himself in London as a consulting physician. For some years he was largely engaged in work connected with public health, being appointed lecturer on this subject at St. Thomas's Hospital (the first appointment of the kind in the country). Across the road was Guy's Hospital. There Greenhow became acquainted with Thomas Addison, and saw the patients mentioned in Addison's book before they died. He also met William Gull, who with William Baly ran the Cholera Committee.

An inquiry Greenhow undertook into mortality from diseases in certain districts in England, for his lectures, was published as a parliamentary paper by John Simon, medical officer of the Board of Health. The facts gathered in this inquiry were made the basis of future work arising out of the Public Health Act 1858, when Simon was medical officer to the Privy Council. Greenhow was engaged for inquiries into diphtheria (1859) and pulmonary disease among operatives (miners, grinders, flax-dressers, etc.), with a report on this latter subject (1860–1861) being of wide interest. Simon resigned in 1876 as Chief Medical Officer to the Privy Council, and the post was abolished: Greenhow had lost an ally. Simon and Greenhow were persuaded that cleanliness led to health, and that pollution, such as in Liverpool, was the cause of the plagues of typhoid and Asiatic cholera in Britain. The government used William Henry Duncan to undermine the conclusions of Greenhow.

Greenhow's various reports as Medical Officer of the Privy Council were instrumental in the emancipation of children, beginning in 1867 with a change to the Workshop Regulation Act. This made it illegal to employ children under the age of eight.

In 1859 Greenhow became a Fellow of the Royal College of Physicians, and in 1861 was elected assistant physician to the Middlesex Hospital and lecturer on the subjects of public health and medical jurisprudence in the medical school. In 1871 he became physician and lecturer on medicine; on his retirement from the acting staff in 1880 he was elected consulting physician to the hospital.

Greenhow was a Fellow of the Royal Society (1870) and a member of many medical societies. In 1879–1881 he was president of the Clinical Society of London, which he had shared in founding in 1867. He was the author of works on diphtheria, chronic bronchitis, and on Addison's disease, the subject of his Croonian lectures (1875). The lectures became the subject of a second book on Addison's disease, and Greenhow delivered the lecture on Addison's disease at the International Medical Congress of 1881: he had had eleven patients of his own. He had pioneered treatment with iron and effervescing medicine which engineered a remission, and so prolonged life.

Greenhow served on more than one Royal Commission, of which Lord Kimberley (Earl of Kimberley) was chairman. He was the medical officer to the Pensions Commutation Board from its formation in 1870 until the day of his death.

In May 1859, Greenhow held the Chair of the Epidemiological Society of London, the establishment which had anaesthetist John Snow as one of its founders. Greenhow and Snow were the most "outstanding practitioners" at Newcastle Infirmary, which would eventually become a medical school, established by Greenhow's uncle, surgeon Thomas Michael Greenhow. Snow's Case Books record that in November 1857, Greenhow was living and working in London and present whilst Snow gave chloroform to a patient.

Greenhow was returning to his home at Reigate on the afternoon of 22 April 1888 - after attending to his duties as medical officer to the Pensions Commutation Board - when, while at Charing Cross Station, he died suddenly.

== Family ==
Greenhow married, in 1842, the widow of Mr. W. Barnard, by whom he had one son, Lincoln College, Oxford University graduate the Rev. E. Greenhow, vicar of Earsdon. She died in 1857, and in 1862 he married secondly to Eliza, daughter of Joseph Hume, M.P., by whom he had two daughters. Allan Octavian Hume was his brother-in-law.

Frances Lupton (née Greenhow), who worked to open up educational opportunities for women, was his first cousin.

== Service at the Middlesex ==
Excerpt from the Record of the Services of the Honorary Staff at the Middlesex Hospital:

- Assistant Physician, 6 June 1861
- Extra Physician, 25 August 1870
- Physician, 31 August 1871
- Consulting Physician from 26 February 1880 until his death on 22 November 1888
- Lecturer on Forensic Medicine, 2 March 1861
- Lecturer on Public Health, 11 July 1862
- Dean of the Medical School, 18 June 1868
- Lecturer on Medicine, 1871-28 October 1876
- Treasurer of the Medical School, 1870-6 April 1878

== Works ==
- "Cholera in Tynemouth" in 1831–1832, 1848-9 and 1853. ...Reprinted from... the Journal of Public Health etc. pp. 26 [London, 1855].
- "Papers Relating to the Sanitary State of the People of England", 1858. Reprinted in Gregg's Pioneers of Demography
- Report of the Medical Officer of the Privy Council. London, 1860.
- Report of the Medical Officer of the Privy Council. London, 1861.
- On Addison's Disease. J. W. Roche, 68 Paradise Street, Rotherhithe, London, 1866.
- On Addison's Disease, being the Croonian Lectures for 1875. Revised and illustrated by plates & reports of cases. London, 1875.
- On Bronchitis and the morbid conditions connected with it. Second edition, enlarged. London 1978.
- On Chronic Bronchitis, especially as connected with gout, emphysema and diseases of the heart. Being clinical lectures delivered at the Middlesex Hospital. London 1869.
- On Diphtheria, 1860.
- On the Study of Epidemic Diseases as Illustrated by the Pestilences of London. Being a paper etc. pp. 24 T. Richards, London 1858.
- Third Series of Cases illustrating Pathology of Pulmonary Disease frequent among Certain Classes of Operatives exposed to the Inhalation of Dust. pp. 18. J. E. Adlard: [London] 1868–69.
- Observations on excisions of the Os Calcis; with cases by H.M.G. First published in the "British and Foreign Medico-Chirurgical Review"... with a letter ... addressed to J. E. Erichsen ... by T. M. Greenhow. London, Newcastle upon Tyne [printed], 1858.
