= William S. Hixon =

American politician

William Southerland Hixon
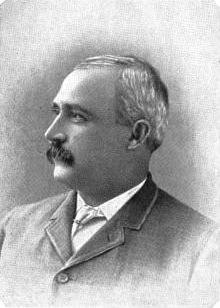

Member of the Chelsea, Massachusetts Board of Aldermen

Member of the Massachusetts House of Representatives
- In office 1888–1889

Member of the Chelsea, Massachusetts Common Council
- In office 1887–1887

Personal details
- Born: November 3, 1848 Cornwall, New York
- Died: September 13, 1921 (aged 72) Chelsea, Massachusetts
- Party: Republican

Military service
- Allegiance: United States of America
- Branch/service: United States Navy
- Years of service: January 17, 1864 – 1867
- Battles/wars: American Civil War

William Southerland Hixon (November 3, 1848 – September 13, 1921) was an American grocer, soapstone manufacturer and politician who served in the Chelsea, Massachusetts Common Council, and in the Massachusetts House of Representatives.
