= Hixson (surname) =

Hixson is the surname of the following people:

- Allie Hixson (1924–2007), American feminist advocate
- Chris Hixson (born 1974), American football quarterback
- Chuck Hixson (born 1947), American football player
- Francis Hixson (1833–1909), commander of naval forces in colonial New South Wales
- Kim Hixson (born 1957), American politician
- Peter Hixson (born 1966), American animation artist
- Sheila E. Hixson (1933–2022), American politician

== See also ==
- Hixon (surname)
