= Death of Michael Hickson =

2020 medical controversy in Austin, Texas

Michael Hickson, aged 43, died on June 11, 2020, after being denied care for COVID-19 by doctors at South Austin Medical Center over his wife's objections. Hickson was a quadriplegic.

Hickson's case received public scrutiny after his wife Melissa recorded a conversation with a doctor; the recording was widely shared. Statements were released by disability advocates, religious groups, as well as the involved hospital.

== Background and death ==
In 2017, Michael Hickson was driving his wife Melissa to work when he had a cardiac incident that led to a brain injury. In February 2020, Family Eldercare, a non-profit agency, was appointed by a judge as a temporary guardian until a hearing could be held to determine Hickson's permanent guardian.

On May 15, 2020, Michael tested positive for COVID-19. On June 2, he was taken to St. David's South Austin hospital; the following day he was transferred to the Intensive Care Unit.

On June 6, Michael's wife Melissa was informed by the hospital that Michael would be transferred to Hospice. A nurse further informed her that her husband would no longer be receiving nutrition or hydration and would not be resuscitated.

In a recorded conversation with the attending physician, Melissa is informed that, against her wishes, her husband will not be nourished, hydrated, or receive treatment for the pneumonia he had developed. After the doctor argues Michael has no quality of life, Melissa questions: "What do you mean? Because he's paralyzed with a brain injury, he doesn't have quality of life?" she asks. The doctor replies: "Correct". Family Eldercare consented to the decision to withhold care, nutrition, and hydration.

Over his wife's objections, Michael was transferred to hospice and his wife Melissa was unable to see him again. When Melissa emailed hospice on June 12 to inquire about her husband's condition, she was informed he had died the previous evening.

== Reactions ==
St. David's released a statement clarifying, in part, that "This was not a matter of hospital capacity. It had nothing to do with Mr. Hickson's abilities or the color of his skin." Family Eldercare, the agency that was appointed to act as Hickson's guardian, released a statement arguing that "Mr. Hickson's spouse, family, and the medical community were in agreement with the decision not to intubate Mr. Hickson".

The National Council on Disability issued a statement denouncing the denial of care and calling for an investigation by the Office of Civil Rights.

== Proposed Legislation ==
A bill, HB 3063: The Michael Hickson Act, has been authored by John T. Smithee proposed in the Texas House of Representatives that would require guardians to contact family members of their wards regarding end-of-life decisions.

== Fifth Circuit Court ==
The case Hickson v. St. David's Healthcare Partnership, pertaining to a civil case on Hickson's death, is before the 5th Circuit Court, but the date the case will be heard is unknown.
