= David Hickson =

Dave Hickson may refer to:

- Dave Hickson (1929–2013), English footballer
- David J. Hickson (born 1931), British organizational theorist
- David Thomas Hickson (born 1967), South African film director, of Beat the Drum
- David Hickson Gyedu (born 1997), Norwegian footballer
