= Rebecca Hickson =

New Zealand animal production professor

Academic background
- Education: Massey University
- Thesis: Assistance at parturition of primiparous, two-year-old, Angus heifers and the effect of liveweight gain of heifers in early pregnancy on birth weight of the calf (2009)
- Doctoral advisor: Stephen Todd Morris, Paul R. Kenyon, Nicolas Lopez-Villalobos

Rebecca Edith Hickson is a New Zealand academic scientist, and is a full professor at Massey University, specialising in improving the production of beef from cast-off dairy calves.

== Academic career ==
Hickson completed a PhD titled Assistance at parturition of primiparous, two-year-old, Angus heifers and the effect of liveweight gain of heifers in early pregnancy on birth weight of the calf at Massey University in 2009. Her research was supervised by professors Stephen Morris, Paul Kenyon and Nicolas Lopez-Villalobos. Hickson then joined the faculty of Massey University, rising to full professor in 2022. As of 2022, she was the chair of the Massey Animal Ethics Committee. At the time of her promotion to professor, Hickson had published 145 peer-reviewed articles and supervised 32 post-graduate students.

Hickson's research focuses on beef production, and with Professor Steve Morris she leads a long-running research trial to try to find better beef cows by breeding from cast-off dairy calves. The research is funded by Beef + Lamb NZ. The research programme encompasses genetics, breeding for traits such as pelt and meat quality, as well as weight-gain, calving ease and length of gestation, breeding efficiency and longevity. Environmental and animal welfare perspectives are also taken into account, and Hickson has helped developed animal welfare protocols for cows in beef calf–cow systems. The research programme has contributed to the government-owned Pāmū (Landcorp) herd setting a goal of 2030 to rear all its non-replacement calves on its 45 farms.

== Selected works ==
- Hickson, Rebecca Edith; Morris ST; Kenyon PR; Nicolas Lopez-Villalobos (2006). "Dystocia in beef heifers: a review of genetic and nutritional influences". New Zealand Veterinary Journal. 54 (6): 256–264. doi:10.1080/00480169.2006.36708. PMID 17151722. Wikidata Q36676081.
- RA Corner-Thomas; PR Kenyon; ST Morris; AL Ridler; Hickson, Rebecca Edith; AW Greer; CM Logan; HT Blair (2015). "Influence of demographic factors on the use of farm management tools by New Zealand farmers". New Zealand Journal of Agricultural Research. 58 (4): 412–422. doi:10.1080/00288233.2015.1063513. Wikidata Q125805810.
- Rhiannon C. Handcock; Nicolas Lopez-Villalobos; Lorna R. McNaughton; Penny J. Back; Edwards, Grant Raymond; Hickson, Rebecca Edith (2018). "Live weight and growth of Holstein-Friesian, Jersey and crossbred dairy heifers in New Zealand". New Zealand Journal of Agricultural Research. 62 (2): 173–183. doi:10.1080/00288233.2018.1465984. Wikidata Q125805811.
- Hickson RE; Nicolas Lopez-Villalobos; Dalley DE; Clark DA; Holmes CW (2006). "Yields and persistency of lactation in Friesian and Jersey cows milked once daily". Journal of Dairy Science. 89 (6): 2017–2024. doi:10.3168/jds.s0022-0302(06)72269-x. PMID 16702265. Wikidata Q83348178.
- Emma Pettigrew; Hickson, Rebecca Edith; S T Morris; N Lopez-Villalobos; S J Pain; Kenyon, Paul; H T Blair (2019). "The effects of birth rank (single or twin) and dam age on the lifetime productive performance of female dual purpose sheep (Ovis aries) offspring in New Zealand". PLOS One. 14 (3) e0214021. doi:10.1371/journal.pone.0214021. PMC 6428402. PMID 30897175. Wikidata Q64067291.
- R C Handcock; Nicolas Lopez-Villalobos; L R McNaughton; P J Back; G R Edwards; Hickson, Rebecca Edith (2019). "Positive relationships between body weight of dairy heifers and their first-lactation and accumulated three-parity lactation production". Journal of Dairy Science. 102 (5): 4577–4589. doi:10.3168/jds.2018-15229. PMID 30827540. Wikidata Q92082678.
- RA Corner-Thomas; Hickson, Rebecca Edith; ST Morris; PJ Back; AL Ridler; KJ Stafford; PR Kenyon (2015). "Effects of body condition score and nutrition in lactation on twin-bearing ewe and lamb performance to weaning". New Zealand Journal of Agricultural Research. 58 (2): 156–169. doi:10.1080/00288233.2014.987401. Wikidata Q125805809.
