= John Fife (surgeon) =

English surgeon

Sir John Fife (1795–1871), was an English surgeon.

Fife was born at Newcastle upon Tyne in 1795, his father being a medical man of Scottish origin, practicing there. After qualifying as a member of the London College of Surgeons, he was for a short time an army assistant-surgeon at Woolwich, but returned to Newcastle in 1815, and commenced practice with his father. As a practitioner, and especially as a surgeon, the took a leading position in his town and throughout the northern counties, being remarkable for his punctuality and for the long distances he would ride in all weathers. In 1834 he took an active part in founding the Newcastle School of Medicine, in which he long lectured on surgery, being also surgeon to the Newcastle Infirmary. He became fellow of the College of Surgeons in 1844.

In 1848, assisted by Dr Robert Mortimer Glover, he did the autopsy on the 15 year old Hannah Greener, who had died controversially under the effects of the then-new drug chloroform, the first human death from this cause.

== Politics ==
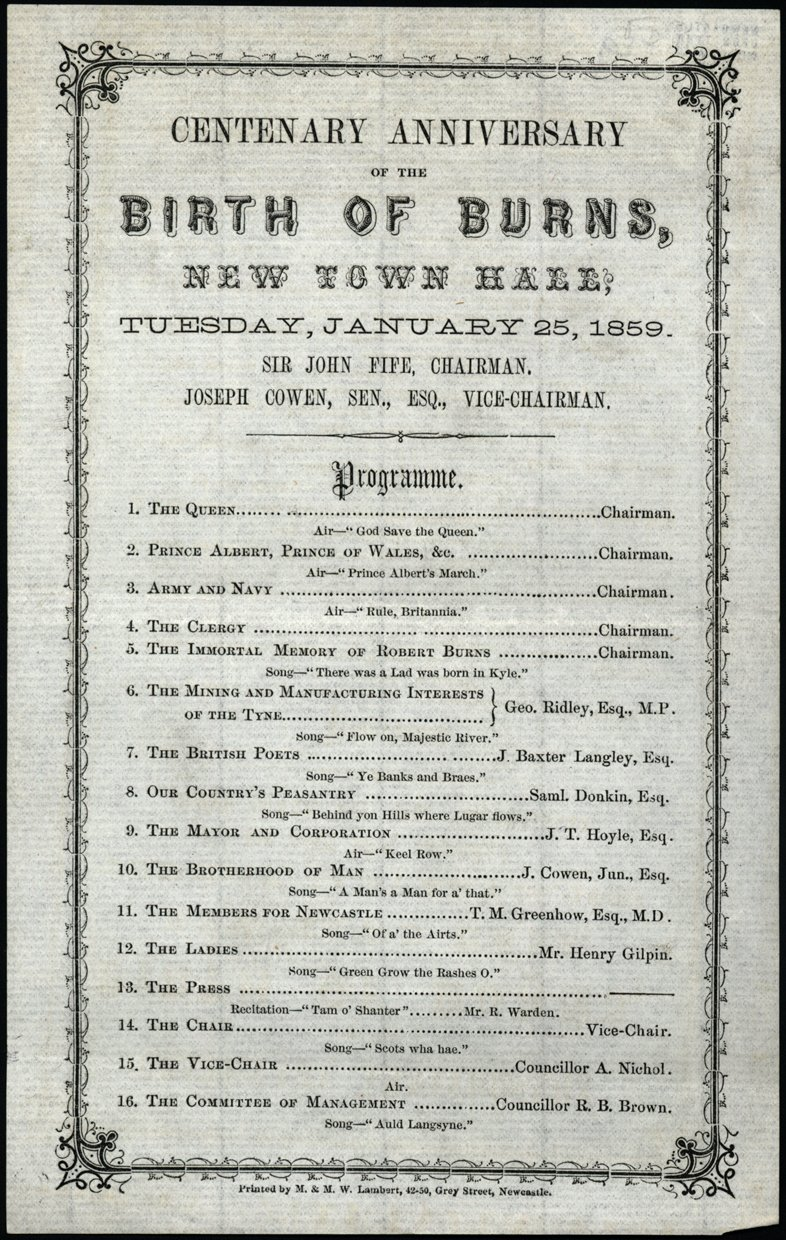
Programme for an 1859 'Birth of Burns' event, held at Newcastle-upon-Tyne, England, with Fife as Chairman (transcription)

Fife's distinction as a local politician was even greater than his mark as a surgeon. He was an advanced liberal, and in his early days was stigmatized as a Chartist. In 1831 he was active in forming the Northern Political Union, which agitated in favour of the Reform Bill. Fife's stirring speeches had a great effect at this time. In 1835 he was elected one of the first members of the new corporation of Newcastle, and was immediately chosen alderman. In 1838–9 he was mayor, and when the Chartist outbreak of July 1839 took place he displayed conspicuous courage and good judgment in suppressing it. For this he was knighted in 1840. In 1843 he was again mayor, and presided at a great meeting on 22 Jan. 1843, addressed by Mr. Cobden, in furtherance of the Anti-Corn Law agitation. He continued a member of the corporation till 1863. He was one of the most influential promoters of the volunteer movement in Newcastle in 1859, and became lieutenant-colonel of the local regiment, resigning his post in 1868, and receiving a silver centrepiece valued at £100 as a testimonial from the regiment. He was for some years president of the Newcastle Mechanics' Institute, and supported many educational and other measures for the benefit of the working classes.

After a life of great activity, Fife suffered from stone in the bladder, which was removed by Sir W. Fergusson in 1870, but he was compelled to retire from practice. On 15 January 1871 he was attacked by paralysis, and died next day at Reedsmouth, North Tyne, aged 75. He married a Miss Bainbridge, by whom he had several children, including four sons. Personally, Fife was held in warm regard by men of all parties. He was frank, openhearted, and generous, courtly in manner and neat in person.
