= Harriet Martineau =

English writer and sociologist (1802–1876)

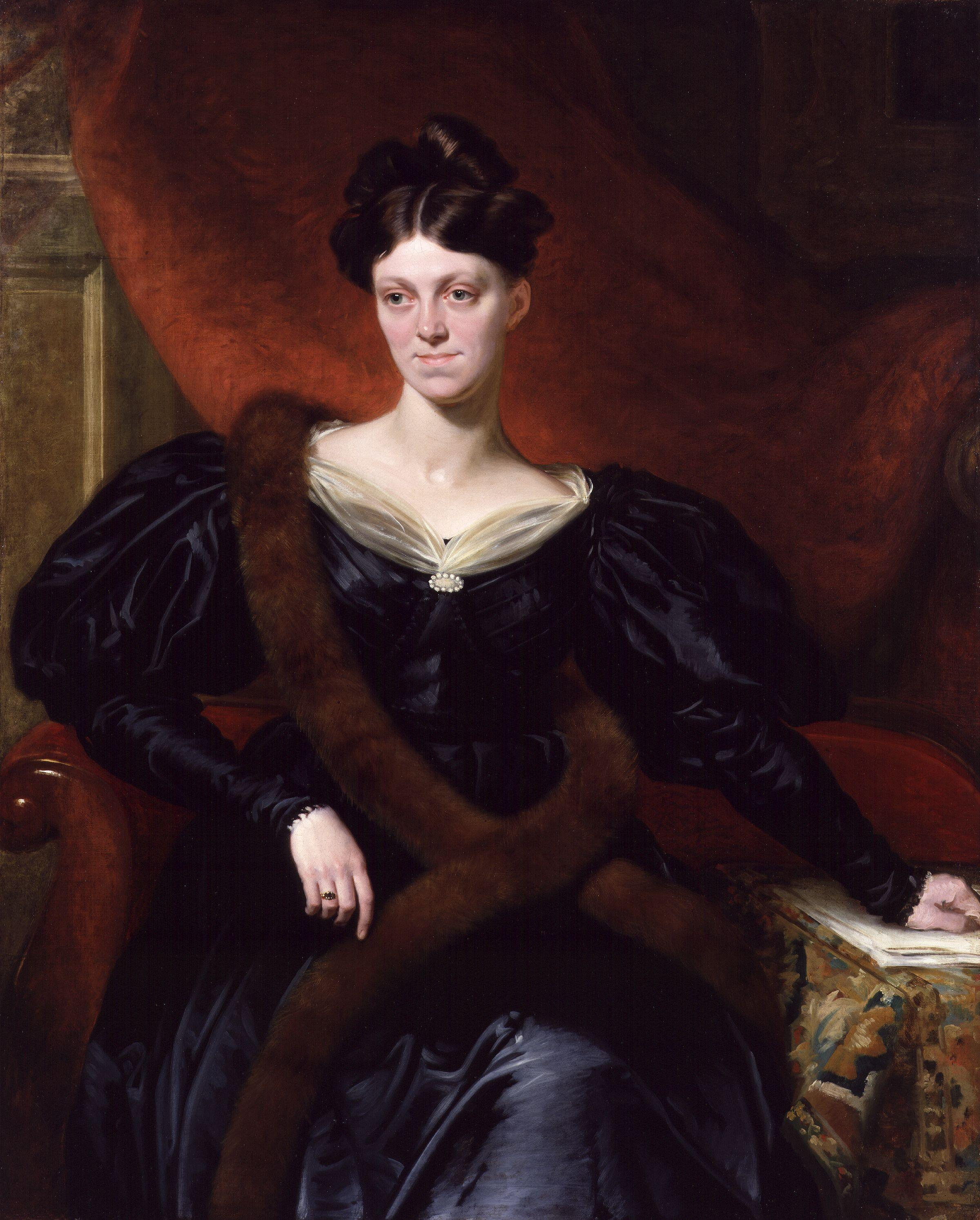
- Martineau by Richard Evans, prepared by Sir Thomas Lawrence (1834)
- Born: 12 June 1802; Norwich, Norfolk, England
- Died: 27 June 1876 (aged 74); Ambleside, Westmorland, England
- Burial place: Key Hill Cemetery in Birmingham, England
- Era: Early and mid-Victorian era
- Known for: Thorough exploration in political, religious and social institutions, as well as the work and roles of women
- Political party: Whig
- Partner: John Hugh Worthington (engaged)
- Family: Martineau
- Writing career
- Notable works: Illustrations of Political Economy (1834); Society in America (1837); Deerbrook (1839); The Hour and the Man (1841)

Harriet Martineau (12 June 1802 – 27 June 1876) was an English social theorist. She wrote from a sociological, holistic, religious and feminine angle, translated works by Auguste Comte, and, rare for a woman writer at the time, earned enough to support herself.

Martineau advised a focus on all aspects of society, including the role of the home in domestic life as well as key political, religious, and social institutions. The young Princess Victoria enjoyed her work and invited her to her coronation in 1838. The novelist Margaret Oliphant called her "a born lecturer and politician... less distinctively affected by her sex than perhaps any other, male or female, of her generation."

Her commitment to abolitionism has seen Martineau's achievements studied world-wide, particularly at American institutions of higher education. When unveiling a statue of Martineau in December 1883 at the Old South Meeting House in Boston, Wendell Phillips referred to her as the "greatest American abolitionist".

== Early life ==
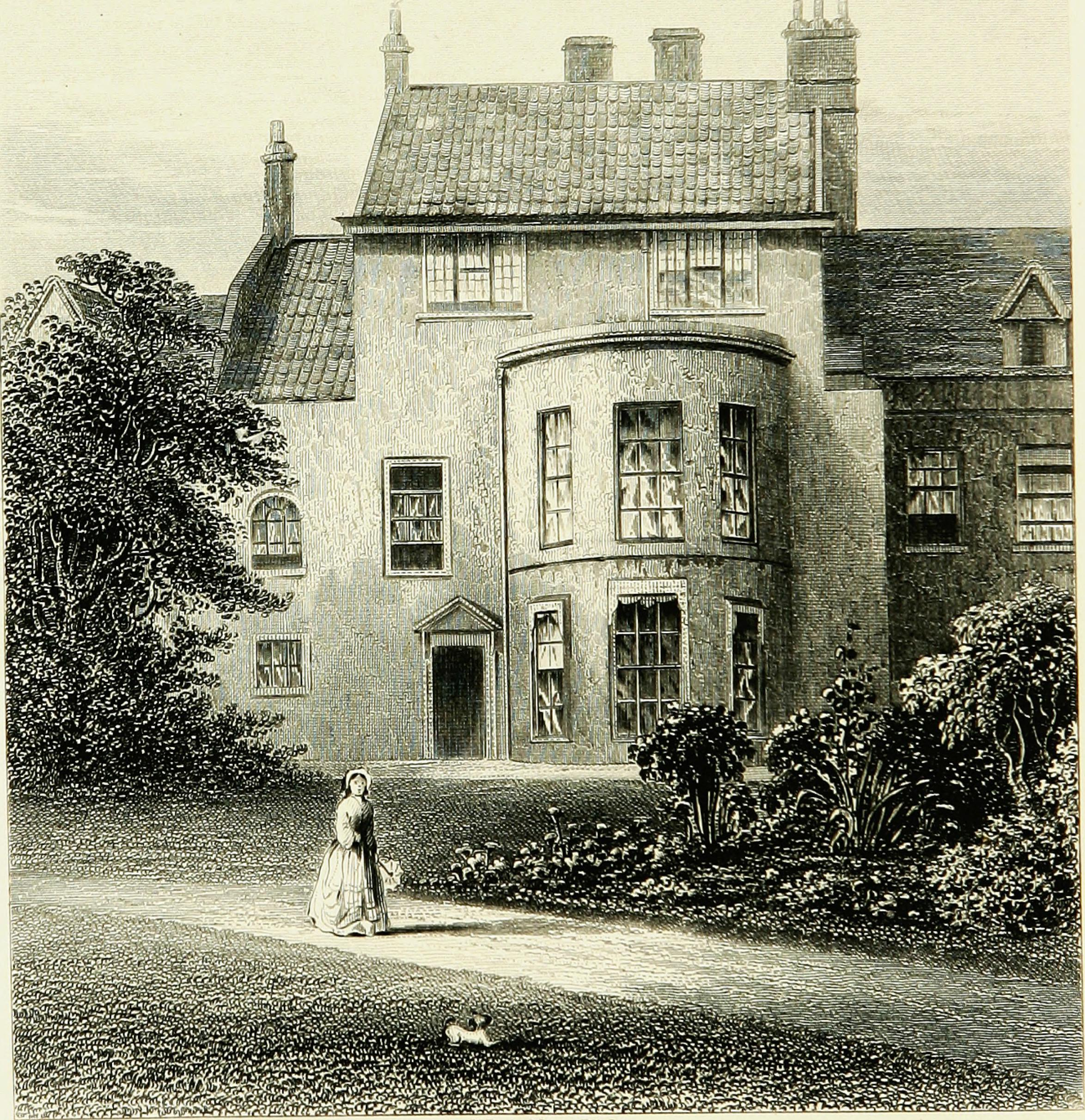
The house in Gurney Court, Norwich, where Harriet Martineau was born

Born in Norwich, England, Harriet Martineau was the sixth of the eight children of Thomas, a textile manufacturer. He served as deacon of the Octagon Chapel, Norwich from 1797. Her mother, Elizabeth (née Rankin), was the daughter of a sugar refiner and grocer. Harriet's five older siblings included two sisters and three brothers. In age order their names were, Elizabeth, Thomas, Henry, Robert and Rachel Ann. Harriet's two younger siblings were James and the youngest of the eight, Ellen. Martineau was closest to her brother James, who became a philosopher and clergyman in the tradition of the English Dissenters.

The Martineau family was of French Huguenot ancestry and professed Unitarian views. Harriet's family was financially comfortable and they were close friends with the Gurney family of Earlham Hall, Norfolk. Harriet's father, Thomas, owned the leasehold of the Gurney's home in Gurney Court, off Magdalen Street, Norwich, Harriet's birthplace. The family's wealth remained intact until after the panic of 1825, a stock market and banking crash.

According to the writer Diana Postlethwaite, Harriet's relationship with her mother was strained and lacking affection, which contributed to views expressed in her later writing. Martineau claimed her mother abandoned her to a wet nurse. It was a tradition for mothers to hire wet nurses for their children, especially if they could not nurse their child by themselves. However the nurse that Harriet's mother hired could not produce sufficient milk. This left Harriet starved for the first few weeks of her life, to which her mother attributed all of Harriet's future ailments.

Harriet's ideas on domesticity and the "natural faculty for housewifery", as described in her book Household Education (1848), stemmed from her lack of nurture growing up. It was found that affection shown toward Harriet by her mother was quite rare. There have been findings that suggested that Harriet had imagined angels coming to take her away, which was thought to symbolise her wish to find a way to escape her mother's reign through suicide.

Although their relationship was better in adulthood, Harriet saw her mother as the antithesis of the warm and nurturing qualities which she knew to be necessary for girls at an early age. Her mother urged all her children to be well read, but at the same time opposed female pedantics "with a sharp eye for feminine propriety and good manners. Her daughters could never be seen in public with a pen in their hand". Despite this conservative approach to raising girls, Harriet was not the only academically successful daughter in the family; her sister Rachel ran her own Unitarian academy with artist Hilary Bonham Carter as one of her students. Mrs Martineau strictly enforced proper feminine behaviour, pushing her daughter to "hold a sewing needle" as well as the (hidden) pen.

Her uncles included the surgeon Philip Meadows Martineau (1752–1829), whom she had enjoyed visiting at his nearby estate, Bracondale Lodge, and businessman and benefactor Peter Finch Martineau.

== Education ==
In the Martineau family, Harriet's mother Elizabeth made sure all her children received a proper education. With the Martineaus being Unitarian, both the boys and girls in the family were expected to receive a conventional education. Harriet was taught at home by several of her elder siblings in the beginning of her education. Harriet was taught French by her mother, which was the predominant language spoken by her father. He taught her Latin and her brother Thomas taught Harriet maths and writing. Being taught at home especially by all her siblings often led to mockery.

When she was nine years old Harriet transitioned to a small school run by a man named Perry. He was supposedly one of the first people to provide her with a positive and non-judgmental learning environment. Late in life, Harriet claimed that Perry's school was the catalyst for her intellectual development and interest in education. As her education progressed she grew fond of the subjects of Shakespeare, political economy, philosophy and history. Despite her love for these topics, her mind was often dominated by the three biggest insecurities in her life: her hearing disability, her poor handwriting, and the look of her hair.

The next step in Harriet Martineau's education came when she received an invitation from the girls' boarding school that her Aunt and Uncle Kentish ran in Bristol. Besides the standard course she took at the school, Harriet began her lifelong self-directed research here. She studied on her own Latin, Greek, Italian, and took a deeper interest in the Bible. Until her brother James, who was born when she was 3 years old, went off to Manchester New College of York in 1821, she did not write often. James and Harriet had a great relationship, so James had suggested that Harriet begin writing as a way to cope with their separation.

== Writing career ==
Martineau began losing her senses of taste and smell at a young age. She was deaf and having to use an ear trumpet at the age of 12. However, it was said that Harriet did not utilise the ear trumpet until her late twenties as she was trying to avoid harassment from others by doing so. It was the beginning of many health problems in her life. With such an early onset of illness, and the death of her father, requiring her to make a living for herself, she became an avid writer. In 1821, she began to write anonymously for the Monthly Repository, a Unitarian periodical. Her first contribution was "Female Writers of Practical Divinity", and in 1823 she published Devotional Exercises and Addresses, Prayers and Hymns.

In 1823 Harriet's brother James introduced her to a friend from school, John Hugh Worthington. The two were engaged but did not marry as Worthington fell ill and died. Martineau reveals in her autobiography that she was in a strange sense relieved in the long run that marriage was not an option, as their relationship was filled with stress and disagreements. Martineau remained unmarried.

Her earliest novels were also published during these years, beginning with Principle and Practice in 1827 and Five Years of Youth: or, Sense and Sentiment in 1829.

Her father died in 1826 and in 1829, the family's textile business failed. Martineau, then 27 years old, stepped out of the traditional roles of feminine propriety to earn a living for her family. Along with her needlework, she began selling her articles to the Monthly Repository, earning accolades, including three essay prizes from the Unitarian Association. Her regular work with the Repository helped establish her as a reliable and popular freelance writer.

In Martineau's Autobiography, she reflects on her success as a writer and her father's business failure, which she describes as "one of the best things that ever happened to us". She described how she could then "truly live instead of vegetate". Her reflection emphasises her experience with financial responsibility in her life while she writes "[her] fusion of literary and economic narratives".

Harriet's first commissioned book, Illustrations of Political Economy, was a fictional tutorial intended to help the general public understand the ideas of Adam Smith. Illustrations was published in February 1832 in an edition of just 1500 copies, since the publisher assumed it would not sell well. Yet it quickly became highly successful and would steadily out-sell the work of Charles Dickens. Illustrations was her first work to receive widespread acclaim, and its success served to spread the free-market ideas of Adam Smith and others throughout the British Empire. Martineau then agreed to compose a series of similar monthly stories over a period of two years, the work being hastened by having her brother James also work on the series with her.

The subsequent works offered fictional tutorials on a range of political economists such as James Mill, Jeremy Bentham and David Ricardo, the latter especially forming her view of rent law. Martineau relied on Malthus to form her view of the tendency of human population to exceed its means of subsistence. However, in stories such as "Weal and Woe in Garvelock", she promoted the idea of population control through what Malthus referred to as "voluntary checks" such as voluntary chastity and delayed marriages.

Martineau was invited to the coronation of Queen Victoria by the Queen herself. She recorded a sceptical view of the day. Martineau recorded some favourable comments, but on the whole thought that the ceremony was "highly barbaric", "worthy only of the old Pharaonic times in Egypt", and "offensive ... to the God of the nineteenth century in the Western world".

One of Martineau's most popular works of fiction was Deerbrook (1839). The book drew attention because it focused on the idea of domestic realism – often referred to as "sentimental" or "woman's" fiction. As the genre suggests, Martineau explores themes of marriage, wealth distribution, female friendship beyond the "domestic" nature that one might expect from a Victorian novel. Martineau's ideas in the novel were inspired by the works of David Hartley. This novel was different from her other works as her development was evident. Her development included both her improvement of fictional writing but also showed mastery of the theories she wrote about.

== London and the United States ==
In the early 19th century, most social institutions and norms were shaped by gender, or the perception of what was appropriate for men versus for women. Writing was no exception; non-fiction works about social, economic and political issues were dominated by men, while limited areas, such as romance fiction, and topics dealing with domesticity were considered to be appropriate for women authors. Despite these gendered expectations in the literary world, Martineau strongly expressed her opinions on a variety of topics.

Martineau's frequent publication in the Monthly Repository acquainted her with editor Rev. William Johnson Fox. First coming to London around 1830, Martineau joined Fox's social circle of prominent thinkers, which also introduced her to Erasmus Alvey Darwin, older brother to Charles Darwin.

In November 1832, Martineau moved to London. Among her acquaintances were: Henry Hallam, Harriet Taylor, Alexander Maconochie, Henry Hart Milman, Thomas Malthus, Monckton Milnes, Sydney Smith, John Stuart Mill, Edward Bulwer-Lytton, Elizabeth Barrett Browning, Sarah Austin, and Charles Lyell, as well as Jane Welsh Carlyle and Thomas Carlyle. She met Florence Nightingale, Charlotte Brontë, Elizabeth Gaskell, George Eliot and Charles Dickens later on in her literary career.

Until 1834, Martineau was occupied with her brother James on the political economy series, as well as a supplemental series of Poor Laws and Paupers Illustrated and Illustrations of Taxation which was intended to influence government policy. About the same time, she published four stories expressing support of the Whig Poor Law reforms. These tales (direct, lucid, written without any appearance of effort, and yet practically effective) display the characteristics of their author's style. Tory paternalists reacted by calling her a Malthusian "who deprecates charity and provision for the poor", while Radicals opposed her to the same degree. Whig high society fêted her.

In May 1834 Charles Darwin, on his expedition to the Galapagos Islands, received a letter from his sisters saying that Martineau was "now a great Lion in London, much patronized by Ld. Brougham who has set her to write stories on the poor Laws" and recommending Poor Laws and Paupers Illustrated in pamphlet-sized parts. They added that their brother Erasmus "knows her & is a very great admirer & every body reads her little books & if you have a dull hour you can, and then throw them overboard, that they may not take up your precious room".

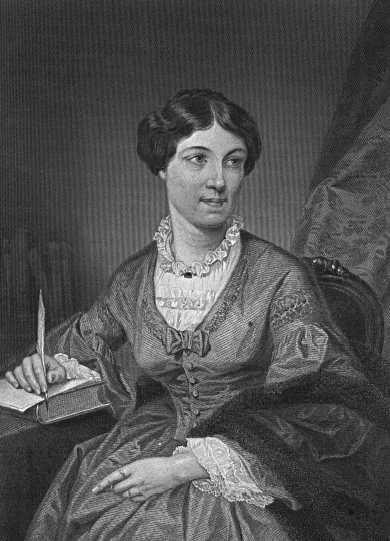
Harriet Martineau

=== Abolitionist ===
In 1834–36, after completing the economic series, Martineau paid a long visit to the United States; she and her travelling companions spanning the nation from New York to Boston, and from Chicago through to Atlanta and elsewhere in Georgia. During this time, she visited a great many people, some little known, others as famous as James Madison, the former US president, at his home at Montpelier. She also met numerous abolitionists in Boston and studied the emerging schools for the education of girls. Her support of abolitionism, then widely unpopular across the U.S., caused controversy, which her publication, soon after her return, of Society in America (1837) and How to Observe Morals and Manners (1838), only fuelled. In Society in America, Martineau angrily criticised the state of women's education. She wrote:

The intellect of women is confined by an unjustifiable restriction of... education... As women have none of the objects in life for which an enlarged education is considered requisite, the education is not given... The choice is to either be ill-educated, passive, and subservient, or well-educated, vigorous, and free only upon sufferance.

The publication of Martineau's Illustrations of Political Economy found public success; "by 1834, the monthly sales ... had reached 10,000 in a decade in which a sale of 2,000 or 3,000 copies of a work of fiction was considered highly successful."

Between 1837 and 1839, Martineau wrote several articles for the London & Westminster Review that reflect two of her most enduring interests: women's issues and abolitionism. Her article "The Martyr Age of the United States" (1839), in the Westminster Review, introduced English readers to the struggles of the abolitionists in America several years after Britain had abolished slavery.

In October 1836, soon after returning from the voyage of the Beagle, Charles Darwin went to London to stay with his brother Erasmus. He found him spending his days "driving out Miss Martineau", who had returned from her trip to the United States. Charles wrote to his sister:

Our only protection from so admirable a sister-in-law is in her working him too hard." He commented, "She already takes him to task about his idleness — She is going some day to explain to him her notions about marriage — Perfect equality of rights is part of her doctrine. I much doubt whether it will be equality in practice.

The Darwins shared Martineau's Unitarian background and Whig politics, but their father Robert was concerned that, as a potential daughter-in-law, she was too extreme in her politics. Charles noted that his father was upset by a piece in the Westminster Review calling for the radicals to break with the Whigs and give working men the vote "before he knew it was not [Martineau's], and wasted a good deal of indignation, and even now can hardly believe it is not hers". In early December 1836 Charles Darwin called on Martineau and may have discussed the social and natural worlds she was writing about in her book Society in America, including the "grandeur and beauty" of the "process of world making" she had seen at Niagara Falls. He remarked in a letter,

She was very agreeable and managed to talk on a most wonderful number of subjects, considering the limited time. I was astonished to find how little ugly she is, but as it appears to me, she is overwhelmed with her own projects, her own thoughts and own abilities. Erasmus palliated all this, by maintaining one ought not to look at her as a woman.

Martineau's earlier popularisation of Thomas Robert Malthus' theories of population control may have helped convince Charles to read Malthus, which provided the breakthrough ideas for his nascent theory of evolution. In April 1838, Charles wrote to his older sister Susan that

Erasmus has been with her noon, morning, and night: — if her character was not as secure, as a mountain in the polar regions she certainly would lose it. — Lyell called there the other day & there was a beautiful rose on the table, & she coolly showed it to him & said 'Erasmus Darwin' gave me that. — How fortunate it is, she is so very plain; otherwise I should be frightened: She is a wonderful woman.

Martineau wrote Deerbrook (1838), a three-volume novel published after her American books. She portrayed a failed love affair between a physician and his sister-in-law. It was considered her most successful novel. She also wrote The Hour and the Man: An Historical Romance (1841), a three-volume novel about the Haitian slave leader Toussaint L'Ouverture, who contributed to the island nation's gaining independence in 1804.

== Newcastle and Tynemouth ==
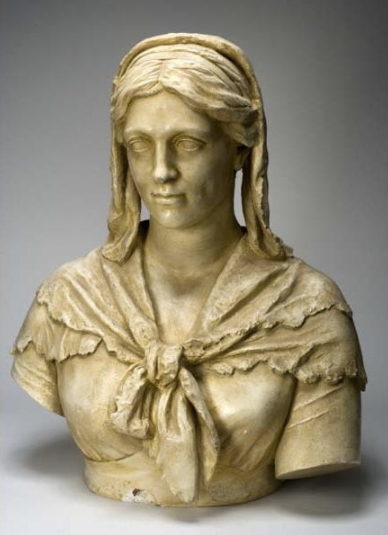
Anne Whitney, Harriet Martineau, 1882, Davis Museum, Wellesley College

In 1839, during a visit to Continental Europe, Martineau was diagnosed with a uterine tumour. She several times visited her brother-in-law, Thomas Michael Greenhow, who was a celebrated doctor in Newcastle upon Tyne, to try to alleviate her symptoms. On the last occasion she stayed for six months in the Greenhow family house at 28 Eldon Square. Immobile and confined to a couch, she was cared for by her mother until purchasing a house and hiring a nurse to aid her.

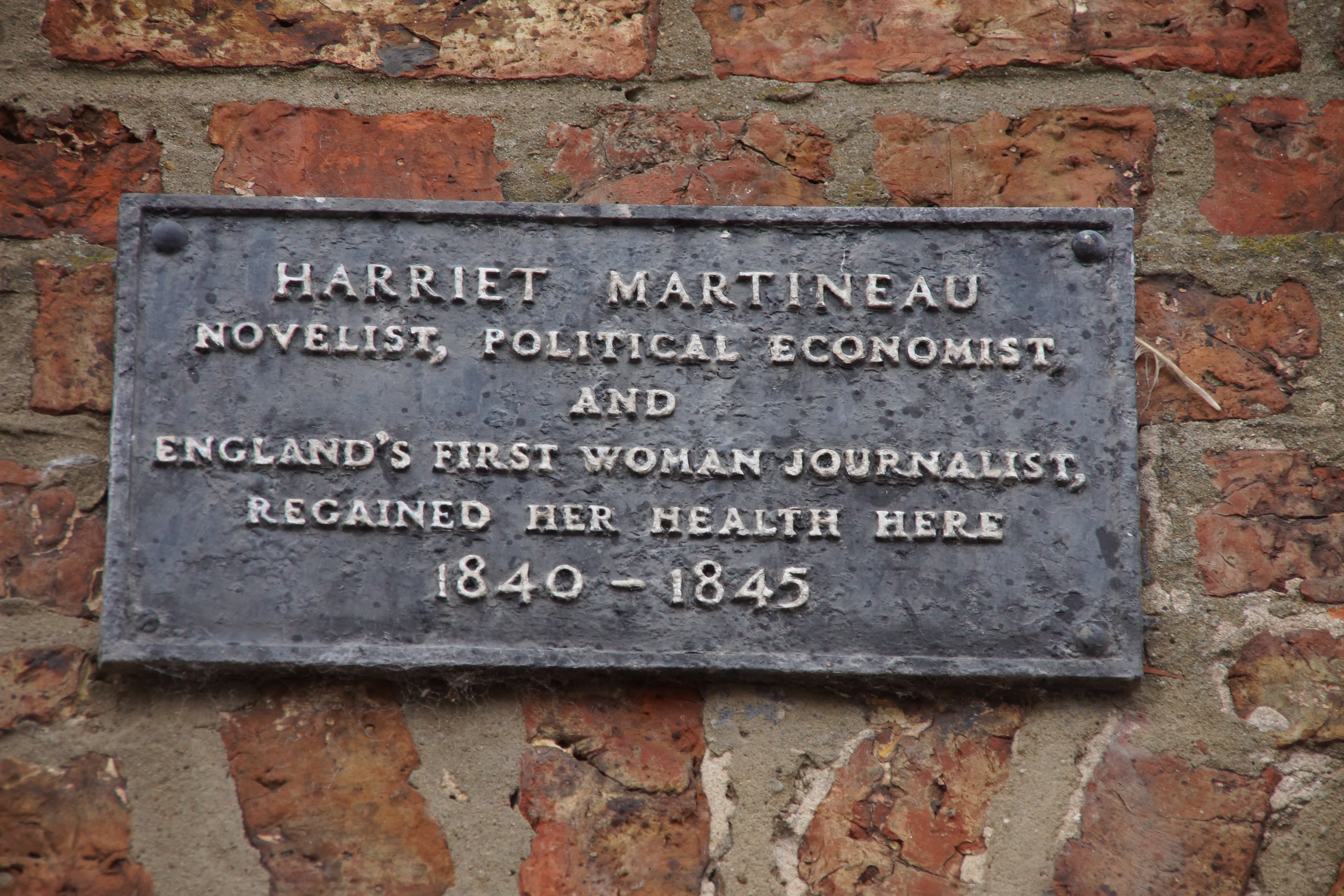
Plaque in Tynemouth

She next moved downriver to Tynemouth where she regained her health. She stayed at Mrs Halliday's boarding house, 57 Front Street, for nearly five years from 16 March 1840. The property was later named the "Martineau Guest House".

The critic Diana Postlethwaite wrote of this period for Martineau:

Being homebound is a major part of the process of becoming feminine. In this interior setting she (Martineau) is taught the home arts of working, serving, and cleaning, as well as the rehearsals for the role of mothering. She sees her mother... doing these things. They define femininity for her.

Martineau wrote a number of books during her illness, and a historical plaque marks this house. In 1841 she published a series of four novels for children, The Playfellow, comprising The Settlers at Home, The Peasant and the Prince, Feats on the Fiord, and The Crofton Boys. In 1844 she published Life in the Sickroom: Essays by an Invalid, an autobiographical reflection on invalidism. In 1847 for John Saunders' The People's Journal she wrote a series of articles titled Homes for the People – Household Education. The book Household Education was published in 1849 and updated by Martineau in 1870. The book highlighted the "subject so important" to her; "Life at Home", where "warm domestic affections" and "family happiness" should exist. She wrote that parents should be "wholly reliable" in order that they be "a joy to all hearts". Lastly, she began working on her autobiography. Completed much later, it included some hundred pages on this period. Notable visitors included Richard Cobden and Thomas and Jane Carlyle.

Life in the Sickroom is considered to be one of Martineau's finest works. It upset evangelical readers, as they "thought it dangerous in 'its supposition of self-reliance'". This series of essays embraced traditional womanhood. While it was supposed by contemporary readers that Martineau dedicated it to Elizabeth Barrett, as it was "an outpouring of feeling to an idealized female alter ego, both professional writer and professional invalid- and utterly unlike the women in her own family", Elizabeth Barrett Browning confirms in a letter that this was not the case: "the dedication of Miss Martineau's beautiful book was not to me—& both she & I have had to say so again & again." Written during a kind of public break from her mother, this book was Martineau's proclamation of independence.

At the same time, Martineau turned the traditional patient–doctor relationship on its head by asserting control over her space even in sickness. The sickroom was her space. Life in the Sickroom explained how to regain control even in illness. Alarmed that a woman was suggesting such a position in the power dynamic, critics suggested that, as she was an invalid, her mind must also be sick and the work was not to be taken seriously. British and Foreign Medical Review dismissed Martineau's piece on the same basis as the critics: an ill person cannot write a healthy work. They thought it was unheard of for a woman to suggest being in a position of control, especially in sickness. Instead, the Review recommended that patients follow "unconditional submission" to the advice of doctors. They disagreed with the idea that Martineau might hold any sort of "authority to Britain's invalids".

Expecting to remain an invalid for the rest of her life, Martineau delighted in the new freedom of views using her telescope. Across the Tyne was the sandy beach "where there are frequent wrecks — too interesting to an invalid... and above the rocks, a spreading heath, where I watch troops of boys flying their kites; lovers and friends taking their breezy walks on Sundays..." She expressed a lyrical view of Tynemouth:

When I look forth in the morning, the whole land may be sheeted with glittering snow, while the myrtle-green sea swells and tumbles... there is none of the deadness of winter in the landscape; no leafless trees, no locking up with ice; and the air comes in through my open upper sash brisk, but sun-warmed. The robins twitter and hop in my flower-boxes... And at night, what a heaven! What an expanse of stars above, appearing more steadfast, the more the Northern Lights dart and quiver!

During her illness, she for a second time declined a pension on the civil list, fearing to compromise her political independence. After publication of her letter on the subject, some of her friends raised a small annuity for her soon after.

In 1844, Martineau underwent a course of mesmerism, returning to health after a few months. There was national interest in mesmerism at this time. Also known as "animal magnetism", it can be defined as a "loosely grouped set of practices in which one person influenced another through a variety of personal actions, or through the direct influence of one mind on another mind. Mesmerism was designed to make invisible forces augment the mental powers of the mesmeric object." Martineau eventually published an account of her case in 16 Letters on Mesmerism, which caused much discussion. Her work led to friction with "the natural prejudices of a surgeon and a surgeon's wife" (i.e., her brother-in-law, Thomas Michael Greenhow and her sister, Elizabeth Martineau Greenhow).

== Ambleside ==
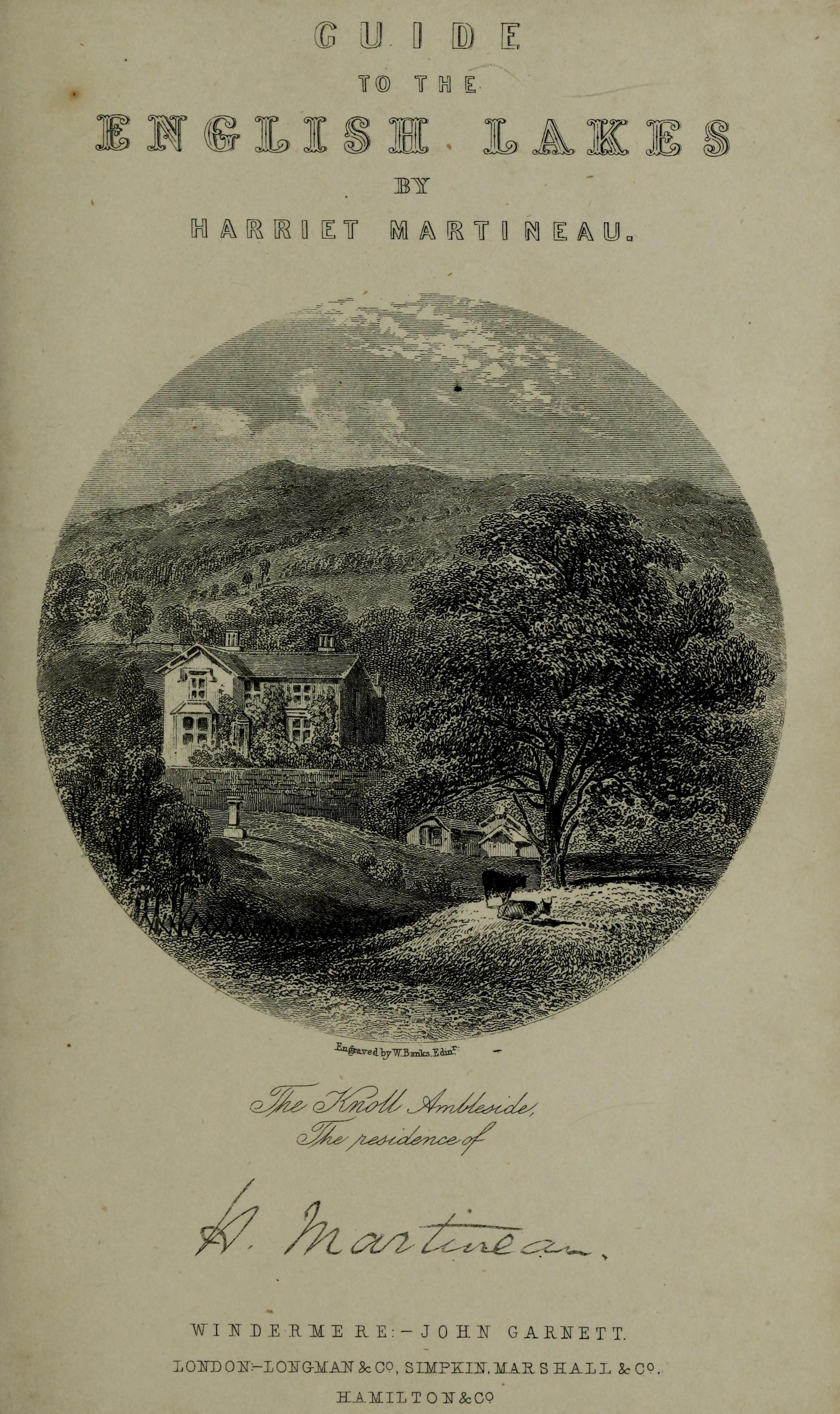
"The Knoll", Ambleside, residence of Harriet Martineau

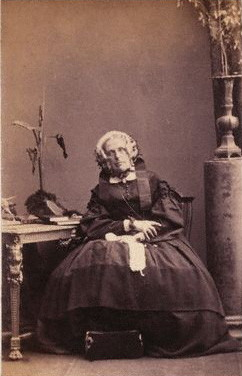
Harriet Martineau, 1861, by Camille Silvy

In 1845, Martineau left Tynemouth for Ambleside in the Lake District, where she designed herself and oversaw the construction of the house called "The Knoll" (made a Grade II listed building in 1974), where she spent the greater part of her later life. Although she was single and had no children she believed that:

No true woman, married or single, can be happy without some sort of domestic life; – without having somebody's happiness dependent on her: and my own ideal of an innocent and happy life was a house of my own among poor improvable neighbours, with young servants whom I might train and attach to myself: with pure air, a garden, leisure, solitude at command, and freedom to work in peace and quietness.

She began house-hunting and the first house she looked at did not have everything she was looking for. Her friend, who went with her to view it, said it would be worth the money to build a house of her own rather than pay for something she did not love. The next place Martineau was brought to look at was the land of a minister at Ambleside called "The Knoll" which she bought. She took on planning the layout of the house, which she found enjoyable. She and her contractor were on good terms and understood each other's expectations, in terms of payment and time commitments. Martineau moved into her new house in April 1846.

== Views on religion, philosophical atheism, and Darwin ==
In 1845, Martineau published three volumes of Forest and Game Law Tales. In 1846, she resided with her elderly mother in Birmingham for some time, following which she then toured Egypt, Palestine and Syria with some friends. On her return she published Eastern Life, Present and Past (1848), in which she reports a realisation standing on a prominence looking out across the Nile and desert to the tombs of the dead, where "the deceased crossed the living valley and river" to "the caves of the death region" where Osiris the supreme judge "is to give the sign of acceptance or condemnation". Her summary: "the mortuary ideas of the primitive Egyptians, and through them, of the civilized world at large, have been originated by the everlasting conflict of the Nile and the Desert".

This epiphany changed the course of her life. Eastern Life expressed her concept that, as humanity passed through one after another of the world's historic religions, the conception of the deity and of divine government became at each step more and more abstract and indefinite. She believed the ultimate goal to be philosophic atheism, but did not explicitly say so in the book. She described ancient tombs, "the black pall of oblivion" set against the paschal "puppet show" in the Church of the Holy Sepulchre, and noted that Christian beliefs in reward and punishment were based on and similar to heathen superstitions. Describing an ancient Egyptian tomb, she wrote, "How like ours were his life and death!... Compare him with a retired naval officer made country gentleman in our day, and in how much less do they differ than agree!" The book's "infidel tendency" was too much for the publisher John Murray, who rejected it. Martineau's biographer, Florence Fenwick Miller, wrote that "all her best moral and intellectual faculties were exerted, and their action becomes visible, at one page or another" of this work. Eastern Life, Present and Past marked an important chapter in Martineau's life as it documented her move away from Unitarianism towards atheism, which was never completed. This shifting of religiosity can best be seen in her instruction to travel with the hopes of gaining a historical understanding of holy places and in her critiques on biblical literalism, as influenced by Samuel Taylor Coleridge. Eastern Life, Present and Past is also important historically, as Billie Melman notes, it was the "first feminine travelogue proper that is not an account of a pilgrimage." In her doing so, Martineau's so-called "anti-pilgrimage" became an important point in the growth of female academia, as well as an addition to the growing field of Egyptology.

Martineau wrote Household Education in 1848, lamenting the state of women's education. She believed women had a natural inclination to motherhood and believed domestic work went hand in hand with academia for a proper, well-rounded education. She stated, "I go further than most persons... in desiring thorough practice in domestic occupations, from an early age, for young girls". She proposed that freedom and rationality, rather than command and obedience, are the most effectual instruments of education.

Her interest in schemes of instruction led her to start a series of lectures, addressed at first to the school children of Ambleside, but afterward extended to their parents at the request of the adults. The subjects were sanitary principles and practice, the histories of England and North America, and the scenes of her Eastern travels. At the request of the publisher Charles Knight, in 1849 she wrote The History of the Thirty Years' Peace, 1816–1846, an excellent popular history from the point of view of a "philosophical Radical". Martineau spanned a wide variety of subject matter in her writing and did so with more assertiveness than was expected of women at the time. She has been described as having an "essentially masculine nature". It was commonly thought that a "progressive" woman was improperly emulating the qualities of a man.

Martineau's work included a widely used guide book to the Lake District, A Complete Guide to the English Lakes, published in 1855 and in its 4th edition by 1876. This served as the definitive guidebook for the area for 25 years, effectively replacing the 1810 Guide to the Lakes by William Wordsworth, and continued in common usage until the publication of M. J. B. Baddeley's Thorough Guide to the English Lake District in 1880.

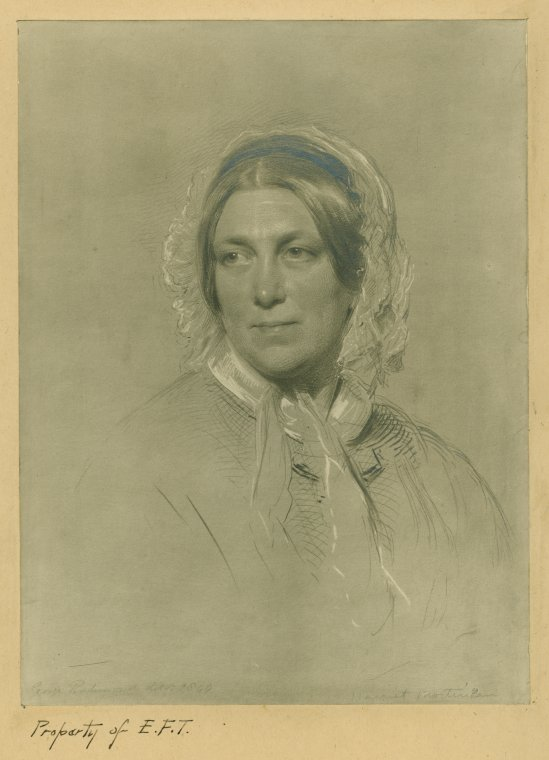
Martineau in her later years, painted by George Richmond

Martineau edited a volume of Letters on the Laws of Man's Nature and Development, published in March 1851. Its epistolary form is based on correspondence between her and the self-styled scientist Henry G. Atkinson. She expounded the doctrine of philosophical atheism, which she thought the tendency of human belief. She did not deny a first cause but declared it unknowable. She and Atkinson thought they affirmed man's moral obligation. Atkinson was a zealous exponent of mesmerism. The prominence given to the topics of mesmerism and clairvoyance heightened the general disapproval of the book. Literary London was outraged by its mesmeric evolutionary atheism, and the book caused a lasting division between Martineau, her beloved brother, James who had become a Unitarian cleric, and some of her friends.

From 1852 to 1866, she contributed regularly to The Daily News, writing sometimes six leaders a week. She wrote more than 1,600 articles for the paper in total. It also published her Letters from Ireland, written during a visit to that country in the summer of 1852. For many years she was a contributor to the Westminster Review; in 1854 she was among financial supporters who prevented its closing down.

Martineau believed she had experienced psychosomatic symptoms and later benefits from mesmerism; this medical belief of the times related the uterus to emotions and hysteria. She had symptoms of hysteria in her loss of taste and smell. Her partial deafness throughout life may have contributed to her problems. Various people, including the maid, her brother, and Spencer T. Hall (a notable mesmerist) performed mesmerism on her. Some historians attribute her apparent recovery from symptoms to a shift in the positioning of her tumor so that it no longer obstructed other organs. As the physical improvements were the first signs of healing she had in five years and happened at the same time of her first mesmeric treatment, Martineau confidentially credited mesmerism with her "cure".

She continued her political activism during the late 1850s and 1860s. She supported the Married Women's Property Bill and in 1856 signed a petition for it organised by Barbara Bodichon. She also pushed for licensed prostitution and laws that addressed the customers rather than the women. She supported women's suffrage and signed Bodichon's petition in its favour in 1866.

In the early part of 1855, Martineau was experiencing heart disease. She began to write her autobiography, as she expected her life to end. Completing the book in three months, she postponed its publication until after her death, and lived another two decades. It was published posthumously in 1877.

When Darwin's book The Origin of Species was published in 1859, his brother Erasmus sent a copy to Harriet Martineau. At age 58, she was still reviewing from her home in the Lake District. From her "snow landscape", Martineau sent her thanks, adding that she had previously praised

the quality & conduct of your brother's mind, but it is an unspeakable satisfaction to see here the full manifestation of its earnestness & simplicity, its sagacity, its industry, & the patient power by which it has collected such a mass of facts, to transmute them by such sagacious treatment into such portentous knowledge. I should much like to know how large a proportion of our scientific men believe he has found a sound road.

Martineau supported Darwin's theory because it was not based in theology. Martineau strove for secularism stating, "In the present state of the religious world, Secularism ought to flourish. What an amount of sin and woe might and would then be extinguished." She wrote to her fellow Malthusian (and atheist) George Holyoake enthusing, "What a book it is! – overthrowing (if true) revealed Religion on the one hand, & Natural (as far as Final Causes & Design are concerned) on the other. The range & mass of knowledge take away one's breath." To Fanny Wedgwood (the wife of Hensleigh Wedgwood) she wrote,

I rather regret that C.D. went out of his way two or three times to speak of "The Creator" in the popular sense of the First Cause.... His subject is the "Origin of Species" & not the origin of Organization; & it seems a needless mischief to have opened the latter speculation at all – There now! I have delivered my mind.

== Economics and social sciences ==
Harriet Martineau propounds political economic theories in Illustrations of Political Economy. She is seen as a frontrunner who merges fiction and economy in a time period when "fiction claimed authority over emotional knowledge, while economics claimed authority over empirical knowledge". Moreover, Martineau's text sets the stage for women to enter into economics. For example, Lana Dalley explains that "by bringing the topic of domestic economy to bear on political economy, Martineau places women more centrally within economic theory and practice. In this context, women – as readers of the Illustrations and as characters with the tales – are not only rendered a part of larger-scale economics but also (because of their participation) encourage to learn the principles of political economy."

As early as 1831, Martineau wrote on the subject "Political Economy" (as the field of economics was then known). Her goal was to popularise and illustrate the principles of laissez-faire capitalism, though she made no claim to original theorising.

Martineau's reflections on Society in America, published in 1837, are prime examples of her sociological methods. Her ideas in this field were set out in her 1838 book How to Observe Morals and Manners. She believed that some very general social laws influence the life of any society, including the principle of progress, the emergence of science as the most advanced product of human intellectual endeavour, and the significance of population dynamics and the natural physical environment.

Auguste Comte coined the name sociology and published a lengthy exposition under the title of Cours de Philosophie Positive in 1839. Martineau undertook a concise translation that was published in two volumes in 1853 as The Positive Philosophy of Auguste Comte (freely translated and condensed by Harriet Martineau). It was a remarkable achievement, and a successful one; Comte recommended her volumes to his students instead of his own. Some writers regard Martineau as the first female sociologist. Her introduction of Comte to the English-speaking world and the elements of sociological perspective in her original writings support her credit as a sociologist.

== Death ==
Harriet Martineau died of bronchitis at "The Knoll" on 27 June 1876, aged 74. An autopsy revealed an ovarian cyst that had grown to twelve inches in diameter. She was buried alongside her mother in Key Hill Cemetery, Hockley, Birmingham. The following April, at Bracondale, her cousin's estate, much of Martineau's extensive art collection was sold at auction.

Martineau said, "...I have not acquired any dread or dislike of death; but I have felt, for the first, time a keen and unvarying relish of life." (Harriet 483). She explained how that, as she knew death was approaching, day by day she was not scared of it or dreading it, in fact she even described how she did not let this knowledge impact her daily life activities.

== Legacy ==
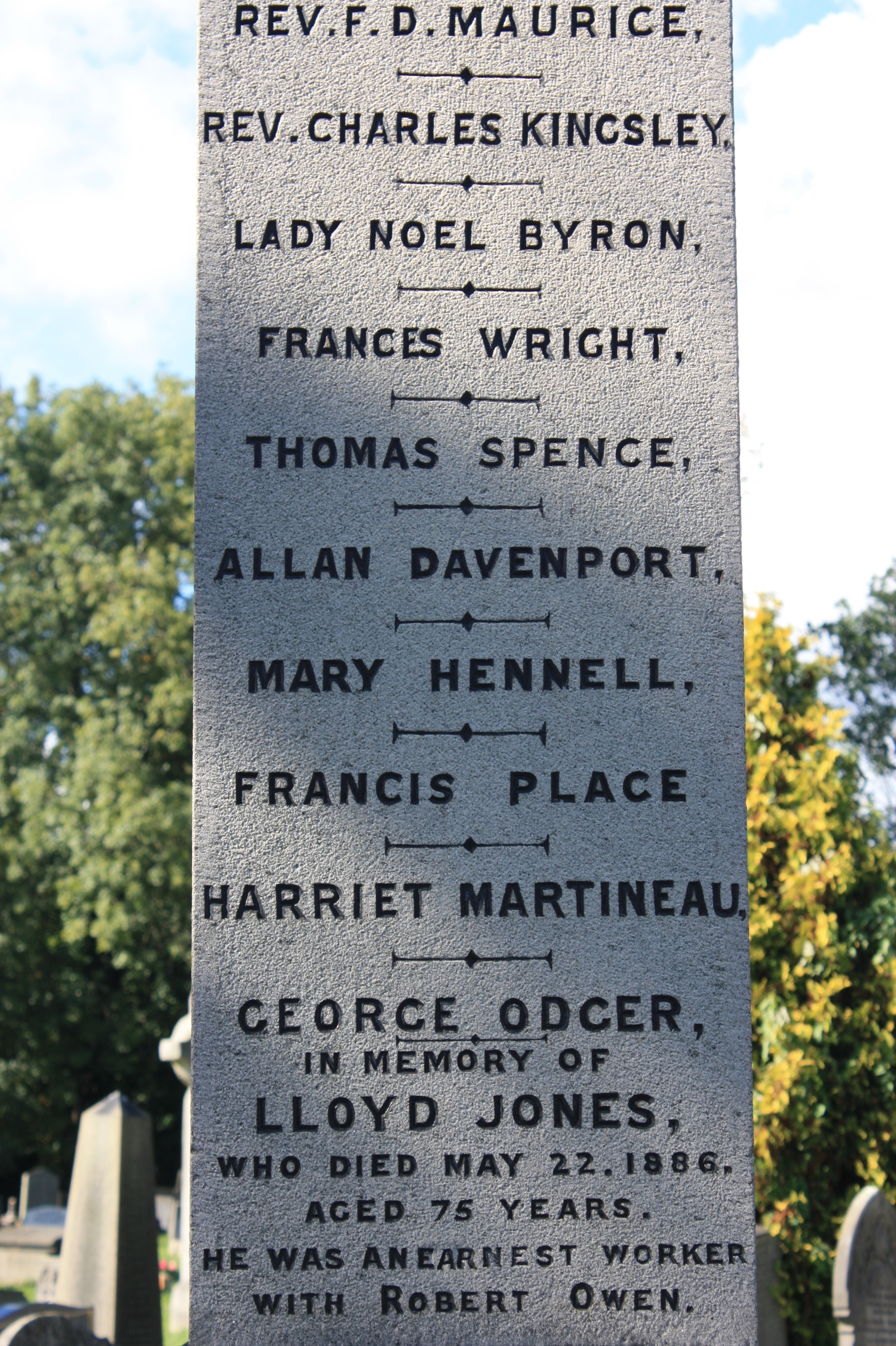
Base of the Reformers' Memorial, Kensal Green Cemetery, including Harriet Martineau's name

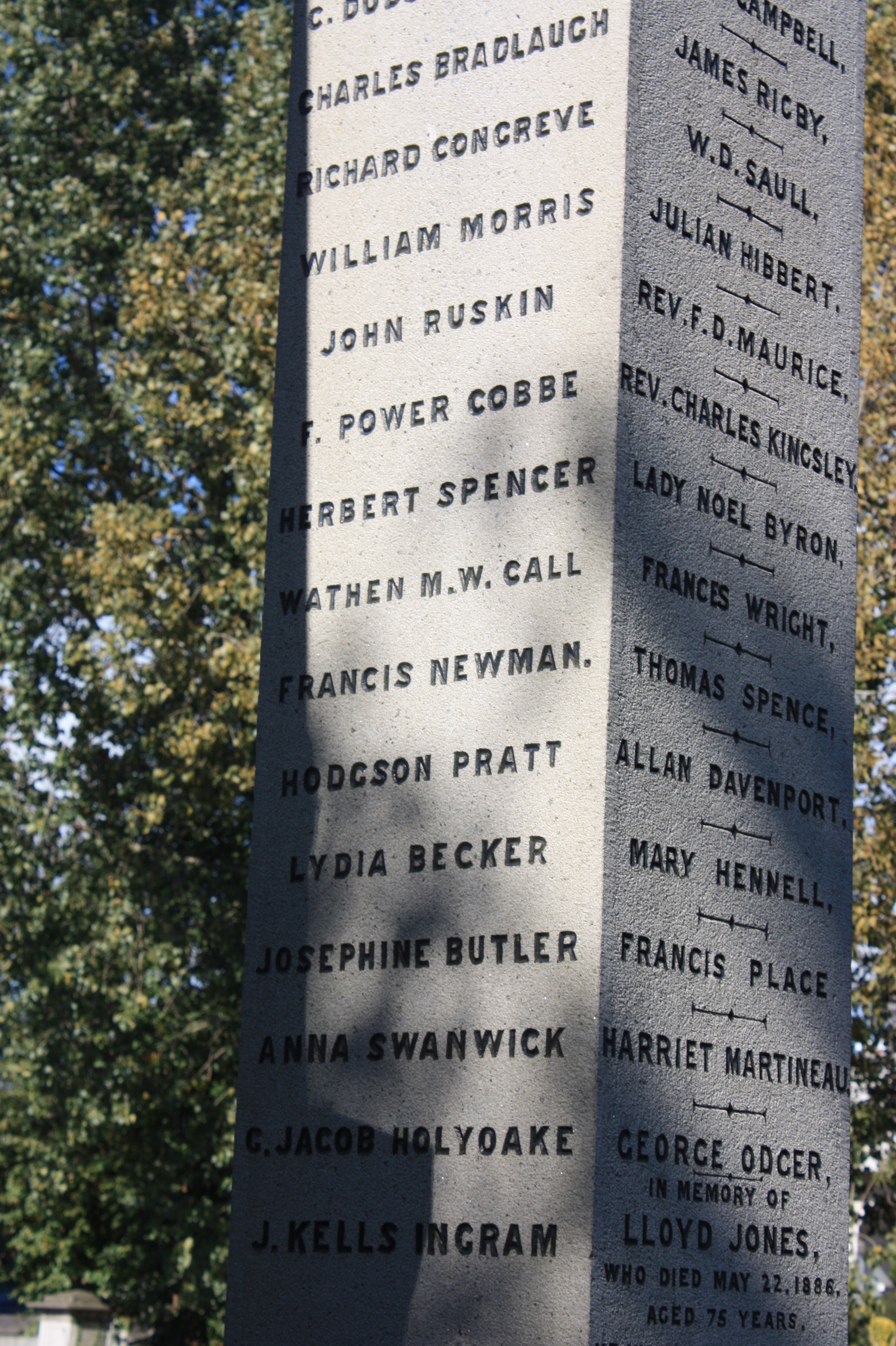
Another view of Martineau's name on the Reformers' Memorial, Kensal Green Cemetery

She left an autobiographical sketch, published by The Daily News on 29 June 1876, in which she wrote:

Her original power was nothing more than was due to earnestness and intellectual clearness within a certain range. With small imaginative and suggestive powers, and therefore nothing approaching to genius, she could see clearly what she did see, and give a clear expression to what she had to say. In short, she could popularise while she could neither discover nor invent.

In 1877 her autobiography was published. It was rare for a woman to publish such a work, let alone one secular in nature. Her book was regarded as dispassionate, "philosophic to the core" in its perceived masculinity, and a work of necessitarianism. She explored childhood experiences and memories, expressing feelings of having been deprived of her mother's affection, as well as strong devotion to her brother James Martineau.

The first volume of History of Woman Suffrage, published in 1881, states: "THESE VOLUMES ARE AFFECTIONATELY INSCRIBED TO THE Memory of Mary Wollstonecraft, Frances Wright, Lucretia Mott, Harriet Martineau, Lydia Maria Child, Margaret Fuller, Sarah and Angelina Grimké, Josephine S. Griffing, Martha C. Wright, Harriot K. Hunt, M.D., Mariana W. Johnson, Alice and Phebe Carey, Ann Preston, M.D., Lydia Mott, Eliza W. Farnham, Lydia F. Fowler, M.D., Paulina Wright Davis, Whose Earnest Lives and Fearless Words, in Demanding Political Rights for Women, have been, in the Preparation of these Pages, a Constant Inspiration TO The Editors.".

Martineau's name is listed on the east face of the Reformers' Memorial in Kensal Green Cemetery in London.

Her lifelong commitment to the abolitionist movement has seen Martineau's celebrity and achievements studied world-wide, particularly at American institutions of higher education such as Northwestern University. When unveiling a statue of Martineau in December 1883 at the Old South Meeting House in Boston, Wendell Phillips referred to her as the "greatest American abolitionist". A statue of Martineau by Anne Whitney was donated to Wellesley College in 1886 but destroyed in a fire in 1914; a plaster copy of the head survives in the Davis Museum at Wellesley College.

The Martineau Society "aims to highlight the principles of freedom of conscience advocated in the nineteenth century by Harriet Martineau and her brother, Dr. James Martineau."

The National Portrait Gallery in London holds nine portraits of Martineau.

Anthony Giddens and Simon Griffiths argued that Martineau is a neglected founder of sociology and that she remains important. She taught that study of the society must include all its aspects, including key political, religious and social institutions, and she insisted on the need to include the lives of women. She was the first sociologist to study such issues as marriage, children, religious life, and race relations. She called on sociologists to do more than just observe, but to work to benefit the society.

== Books ==
- Illustrations of taxation. No. I. The park and the paddock. A Tale; No. II. The tenth haycock; No. III. The jerseymen meeting. A tale; No. IV. The Jerseymen parting. A tale; No V. The scholars of Arneside, a tale; Charles Fox, 1834
- Illustrations of Political Economy. Vol. I. Life in the wilds; The hill and the valley; Brooke and Brooke farm; Vol. II. Demerara; Ella of Garveloch; Weal and woe in Garveloch; Vol. III. A Manchester strike; Cousin Marshall; Ireland; Vol. IV. Homes abroad; For each and for all; French wines and politics; Vol. V. The Charmeu sea; Berkeley the banker – part I; Berkeley the banker – part II; Vol. VI. mrssrs. Vanderput and Snoek; The loom and the lugger – part I; The loom and the lugger – part II; Vol. VII. Sowes not reapers; Cinnamon and pearls; A tale of the Tyne; Vol. VIII. Drier creek; The three ages; Vol. IX. The farrers of Budge-row; The moral of many fables; Charles Fox, 1834
- Miscellanies. Volume I; Volume II; Hilliard, Gray and Co., 1836
- Society in America; 3 volumes; Saunders and Otley, 1837; (reissued by Cambridge University Press, 2009; ISBN 978-1-108-00373-5); Internet Archive
- Retrospect of Western Travel; Saunders and Otley, 1838, (Project Gutenberg Volume 1, Volume 2)
- How to Observe Morals and Manners; Charles Knight and Co, 1838; Google Books, Project Gutenberg
- Deerbrook; London, 1839; Project Gutenberg
- The Hour and the Man: An Historical Romance, 1841, Project Gutenberg
- The Playfellow (comprising The Settlers at Home, The Peasant and the Prince, Feats on the Fiord, and The Crofton Boys); Charles Knight, 1841 (ed. 1905)
- Life in the Sickroom. Essays. By an invalid ( = Harriet Martineau), 1844
- The Billow and the Rock, 1846
- Household Education, 1848, Project Gutenberg
- Eastern Life. Present and Past; 3 volumes; Edward Moxon, 1848. (Complete in one volume. Philadelphia, Lea and Blanchard)
- The History of the Thirty Years' Peace, A.D. 1816–1846. Vol. I (From 1816–1824); Vol. II (From 1824–1833); Vol. III (From 1830–1841); Vol. IV (From 1837–1846) (1849) (Edition London, George Bell and Sons, 1877–1878)
- Letters from Ireland; Chapman, 1852
- The positive philosophy of Auguste Comte Vol. I; Vol. II. (1853) Edition: London, Kegan Paul, Trench, Trübner & Co, 1893. Freely translated and condensed after Cours de philisophie positive by Auguste Comte (reissued by Cambridge University Press, 2009; ISBN 978-1-108-00118-2)
- England and her soldiers; Smith, Elder & Co., 1859
- Feats on the Fiord. A Tale of Norway; Routledge, Warne, & Routledge, 1865, Project Gutenberg
- Harriet Martineau's Autobiography. With Memorials by Maria Weston Chapman; 2 volumes; Smith, Elder & Co, 1877; Liberty Fund.
- Harriet Martineau's letters to Fanny Wedgwood. Stanford, Calif, Stanford University Press, 1983 ISBN 0-8047-1146-1. Edited by Elisabeth Sanders Arbuckle
- Harriet Martineau. Selected letters. Oxford, Clarendon Press, 1990 ISBN 0-19-818604-5. Edited by Valerie Sanders
- Writings on slavery and the American Civil War. DeKalb, Northern Illinois University Press, 2002 ISBN 0-87580-292-3. Ed. by Deborah Anna Logan
- A Complete Guide to the English Lakes; John Garnett 1855 and later editions
- H. G. Atkinson and H. Martineau, Letters on the Laws of Man's Nature and Development; Chapman, 1851 (reissued by Cambridge University Press, 2009; ISBN 978-1-108-00415-2)

== Archives ==
The Cadbury Research Library at the University of Birmingham holds three archive collections concerning Harriet Martineau: her papers and correspondence, letters additional, and the Martineau family papers.

== See also ==
- History of feminism
- List of sociologists
- List of suffragists and suffragettes
