= Esdaile =

Esdaile is a surname. Notable people with the surname include:

- Arundell Esdaile (1880–1956), British librarian, Secretary to the British Museum, 1926-40
- James Esdaile (1808–1859), surgeon and mesmerist
- James Esdaile (mayor) (1714–1793), Lord Mayor of London, 1777
- James Esdaile (minister) (1775–1854), Scottish minister and writer
- Katharine Esdaile (1881–1950), British art historian
- Nicole Esdaile (born 1987), Australian goalball player
- William Esdaile (1758–1837), English banker

== Places ==
- Esdaile, Wisconsin

== Other ==
- Esdaile state, an extreme procedure in hypnosis
