= Thomas Snelling =

British numismatist

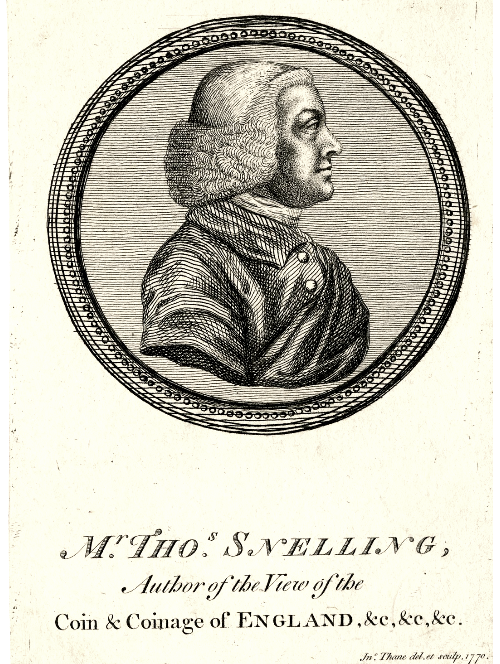
Thomas Snelling

Thomas Snelling (1712 – 2 May 1773) was an English numismatist.

== Life ==
Snelling carried on business as a coin dealer and bookseller at 163 Fleet Street, London, next to the Horn Tavern (later the Anderton's Hotel). The 1756 Newbury Hoard came into his possession. He discussed it in his 1762 work on silver coins.

Snelling's name occurs as a purchaser at London coin-sales c.1766; and among his numismatic customers was William Hunter the anatomist. Another of his customers was the Rev. Joseph Kilner, who built up a collection that he left to Merton College. Snelling died on 2 May 1773, and his son, also Thomas Snelling, carried on business as a printseller at the same address, and published posthumously two of his father's works.

Snelling's coins, medals, and antiques were sold by auction at Langford's, Covent Garden, 21–24 January 1774. The coins were principally Greek and Roman.

There are three portrait medals of Snelling in the British Museum, by G. Rawle, Lewis Pingo, and John Kirk. A portrait of him was drawn and engraved by John Thane, 1770, and William Tassie made a medallion of him. There is also a medallion in the Tassie series of his daughter.

== Works ==
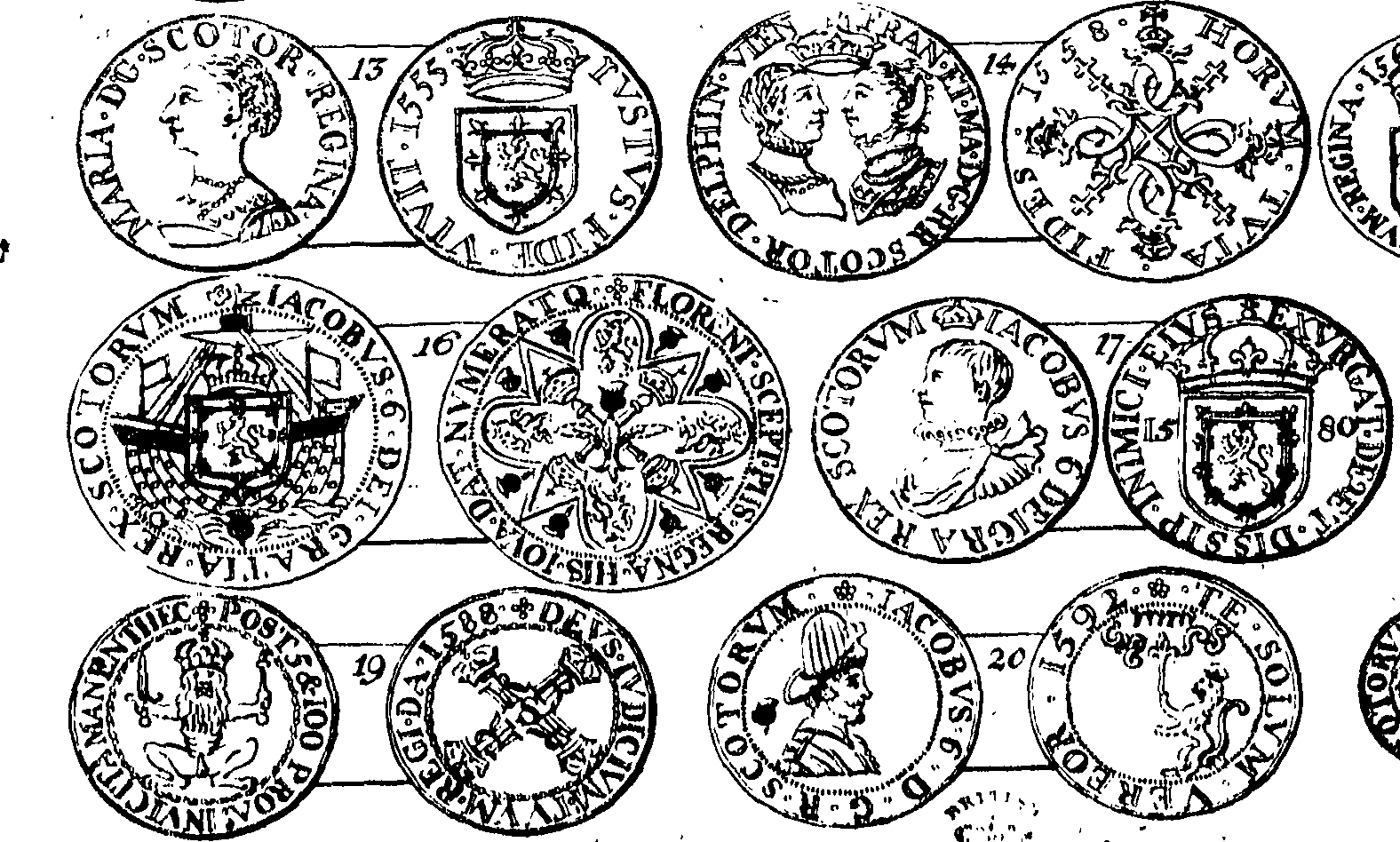
Illustration from Snelling's A View of the Silver Coin and Coinage of Scotland

Snelling wrote and published many treatises on British coins. The plates of his View of the Silver Coin … of England are coarsely executed, but Edward Hawkins (Silver Coins) praised them for their fidelity. On the title-pages and plates of his books Snelling usually inserted the advertisement: "Who buys and sells all sorts of coins and medals."

Snelling's works are as follows:

- Seventy-two Plates of Gold and Silver Coin, mostly English, 1757. Henry William Henfrey (Num. Chron. 1874, pp. 159 f.) has shown that these were probably printed from copperplates, engraved for Sir James Harrington and the committee of the mint in 1652.
- A View of the Silver Coin … of England, 1762.
- A View of the Gold Coin … of England, 1763.
- A View of the Copper Coin … of England, 1766 (includes the tradesmen's tokens).
- A View of the COINS at this time current throughout Europe.... , 1766 .
- The Doctrine of Gold and Silver Computations, 1766.
- A Supplement to Mr. Simon's Essay on Irish Coins, 1767.
- Miscellaneous Views of the Coins struck by English Princes in France, &c., 1769 (includes an account of counterfeit sterlings, and of English colonial and pattern coins).
- A View of the Origin … of Jettons or Counters, 1769.
- A View of the Silver Coin and Coinage of Scotland, 1774.
- Thirty-three Plates of English Medals, 1776.
