= Arthur Henfrey (botanist) =

English surgeon and botanist (1819–1859)

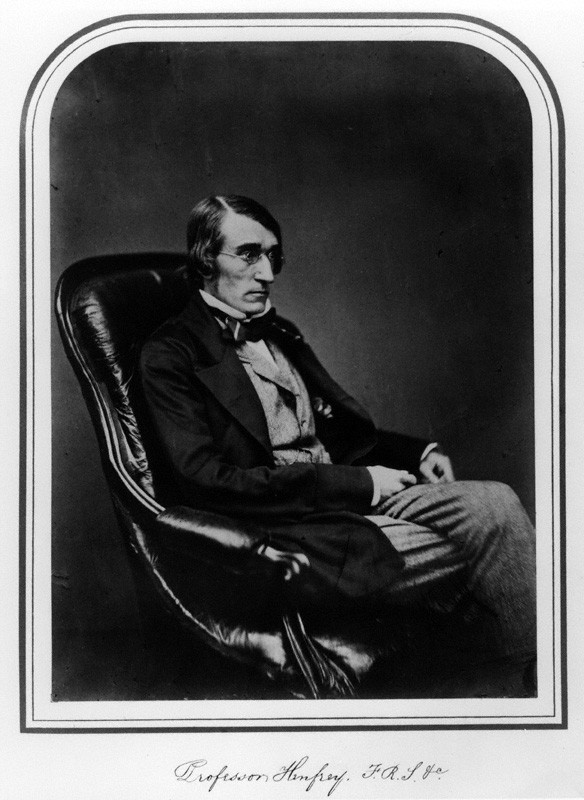
Henfrey in 1855

Arthur Henfrey (1 November 1819 – 7 September 1859) was an English surgeon and botanist.

== Biography ==
Henfrey was born of English parents at Aberdeen on 1 November 1819. He studied medicine and surgery at St. Bartholomew's Hospital, London, and was admitted a member of the Royal College of Surgeons in 1843. Poor health caused him to give up his medical career.

In 1847, Henfrey lectured on plants at the medical school of St. George's Hospital. He then succeeded Edward Forbes in the botanical chair at King's College London in 1853; and was examiner in natural history to the Royal Military Academy and also to the Society of Arts. He was elected an associate of the Linnean Society in 1843, and a fellow in the next year. In 1852, he was elected a fellow of the Royal Society.

Henfrey died at Turnham Green on 7 September 1859, aged 39. The genus Henfreya of John Lindley, of the Acanthaceæ, was merged into the Asystasia of Blume.

== Works ==
Henfrey wrote:

- Anatomical Manipulations, 1844, with Alfred Tulk.
- Outlines of Structural and Physiological Botany, 1847.
- Reports and Papers on Botany, Ray Society, 1849.
- The Rudiments of Botany, 1849; 2nd edit. 1859.
- The Vegetation of Europe, its Conditions and Causes, 1852.
- The Relations of Botanical Science to other Branches of Knowledge, 1854.
- Introductory Address, King's College, London, 1856.
- An Elementary Course of Botany, 1857; fourth ed. 1884.
- On the Educational Claims of Botanical Science, 1857.

He translated:

- On Vegetable Cells, by Carl von Nägeli; for the Ray Society, 1846.
- Chemical Field Lectures, by Julius Adolph Stöckhardt, 1847.
- The Earth, Plants, and Man, by Joakim Frederik Schouw, 1847.
- The Plant, by Matthias Schleiden, 1848.
- Principles of the Anatomy of the Vegetable Cell, by Hugo von Mohl, 1851.
- In: Botanical and physiological memoirs…, 1853:
  - The phenomenon of rejuvenescence in nature, especially in the life and development of plants, by Alexander Braun.

Henfrey also edited:

- Scientific Memoirs (New Series, Natural History), 1837, with Thomas Henry Huxley.
- The Botanical Gazette, 1849.
- Journal of the Photographic Society, vols. i. and ii., 1853.
- Micrographic Dictionary, 1854, with John William Griffith.
- A revised and enlarged edition of George William Francis's Anatomy of the British Ferns, 1855.

== Family ==
Henfrey married Elizabeth Anne Henry, eldest daughter of the Hon. Jabez Henry. She survived her husband for more than 40 years, and died 86 years old at Hanworth House, Chertsey, on 10 October 1902. Henry William Henfrey the numismatist was their son.
