= Arthur Henfrey =

Arthur Henfrey may refer to:

- Arthur Henfrey (footballer) (1867–1929), English footballer
- Arthur Henfrey (botanist) (1819–1859), English surgeon and botanist
