= John Thane (dealer) =

English art dealer

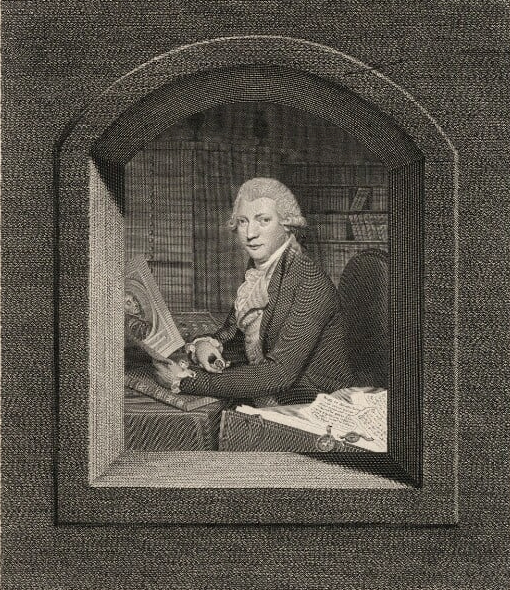
- Memorial portrait of John Thane from 1819
- Born: 12 August 1747
- Died: 3 May 1818 (aged 70)
- Occupations: Art dealer and engraver
- Children: Thomas Thane

John Thane (1747–1818) was an English art dealer, working also as an engraver and printseller. He is known for British Autography, a multi-volume work of portraits with handwriting samples of famous personages.

== Life ==
Thane carried on business for many years in Soho, London, and became known for his expertise on pictures, coins, and objets de vertu. He was a friend of the antiquarian Joseph Strutt, who at one period resided in his family. On John Fothergill's death in 1780 his collection of engraved portraits was sold to Thane, who cut up the volumes and disposed of the contents to the principal collectors of British portraits at that time; this collection had been made initially by John Nickolls.

At the 1798 sale of the print collection of John Barnard (1709–1784), Thane acted as agent for Clayton Mordaunt Cracherode. He paid high prices for works by Rembrandt. After Carcherode's death the following year, much of his collection went to the British Museum. The scandal of a few years later, in which Robert Dighton sold prints he had stolen from the Museum, saw Thane give testimony relating to Dighton's removal of Cracherode's distinctive collector mark.

Thane also acted as agent for William Esdaile. In 1825, at the sale of the collection of George Baker (1747–1811), Thane bought some Hogarth pen sketches on Esdaile's behalf. Alan Munby gives a detailed provenance of a missal, now MS M.306 in the Morgan Library & Museum, bought by Thane at the sale for Edward Astle (1770–1816), son of Thomas Astle, noting it "passed into" the hands of Esdaile. In this case the Morgan provenance suggests it went via the collection of Francis Douce.

Thane died in 1818. His portraits were sold in May 1819. He had acquired the "Henry Unton Memorial Portrait" in 1773, at the sale of the estate of James West. The picture was then out of circulation until 1847. Henry Nugent Bankes put it on public show in 1866. It went in 1884, after his death, to the National Portrait Gallery, London. Thane's collection included a watercolour by Isaak Major, and drawings by Jan Gossaert and Jacques Callot.

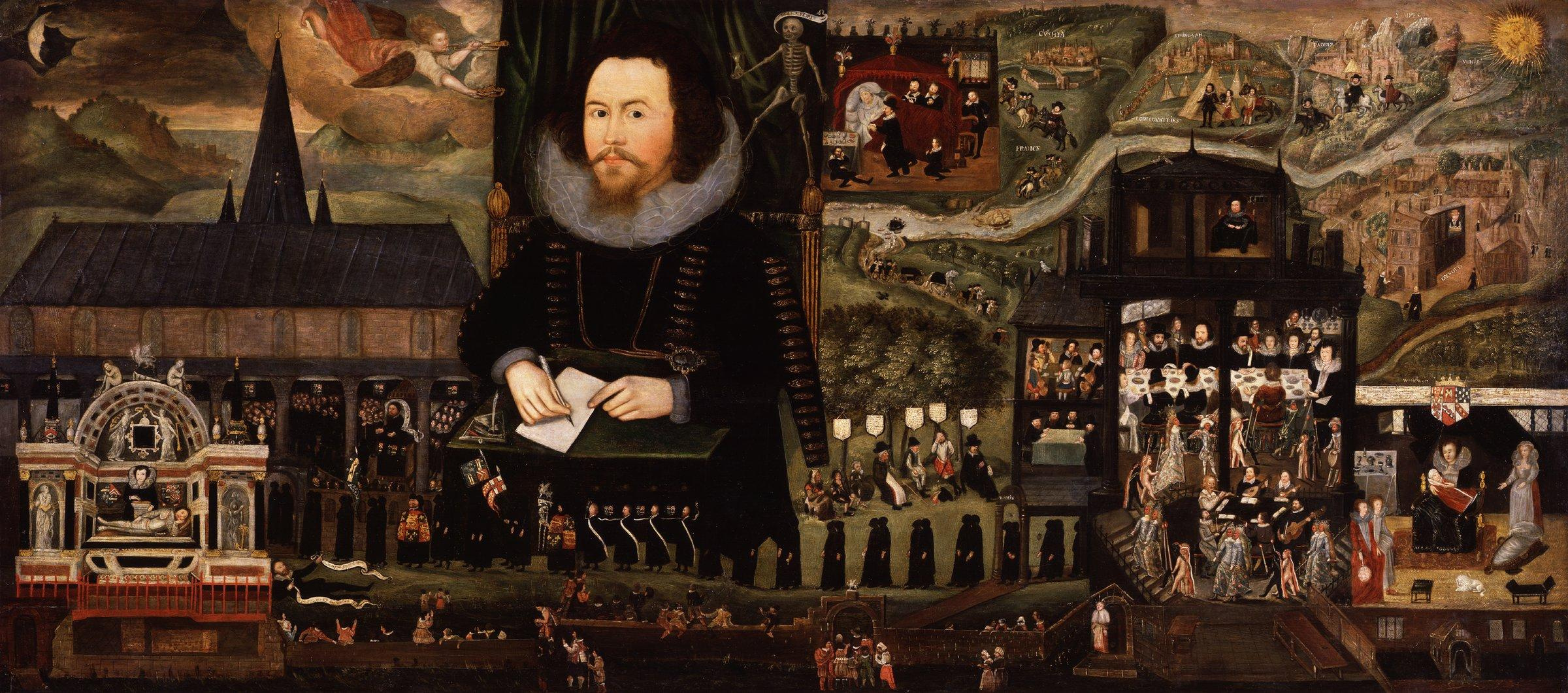
Portrait of Sir Henry Unton, owned by John Thane, now in the National Portrait Gallery, London

== Works ==
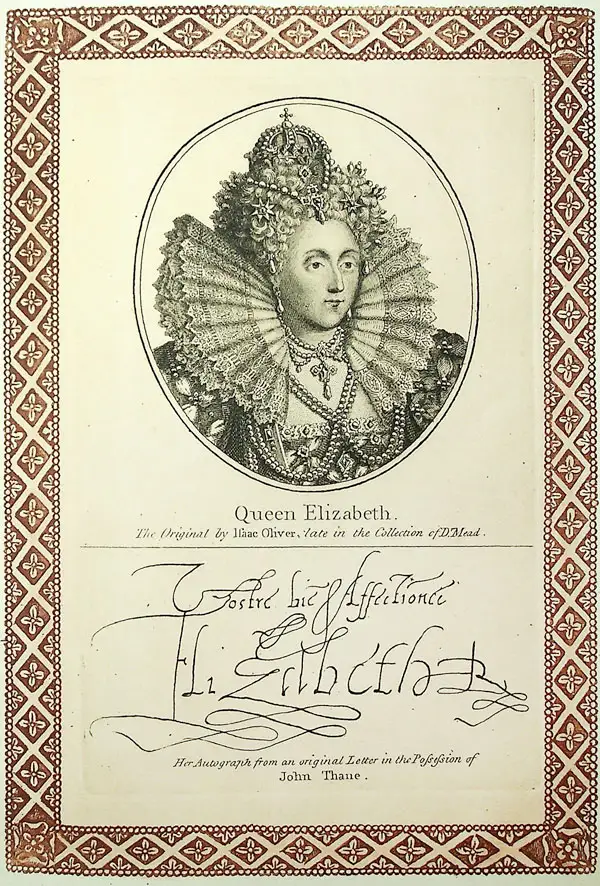
Portrait of Elizabeth I, after Isaac Oliver, with the queen's signature, from British Autography

Thane collected the works of Thomas Snelling, the medallic antiquarian, and published them with a portrait drawn and engraved by himself. He was the editor of British Autography: a Collection of Facsimiles of the Handwriting of Royal and Illustrious Personages, with their Authentic Portraits, London (from 1793, 3 vols.) A supplement to this work was published by Edward Daniell, in 1854. According to Pamela Corpron Parker, its publication "testifies to the growing interest in autograph collecting" during the 18th century. The work was often used for purposes of extra-illustration.

== Family ==
Thane married in 1770 Mary Lord, daughter of Thomas Snelling. He was married again, in 1776, to Elizabeth Seymour Flack. She survived him, with four sons and three daughters. He was the father of the collector Thomas Thane (1782–1846), and is thought also probably to be the father of the artist and restorer William Thane (died 1850).
