= Scientific Memoirs =

Series of books about science published between 1837 and 1852

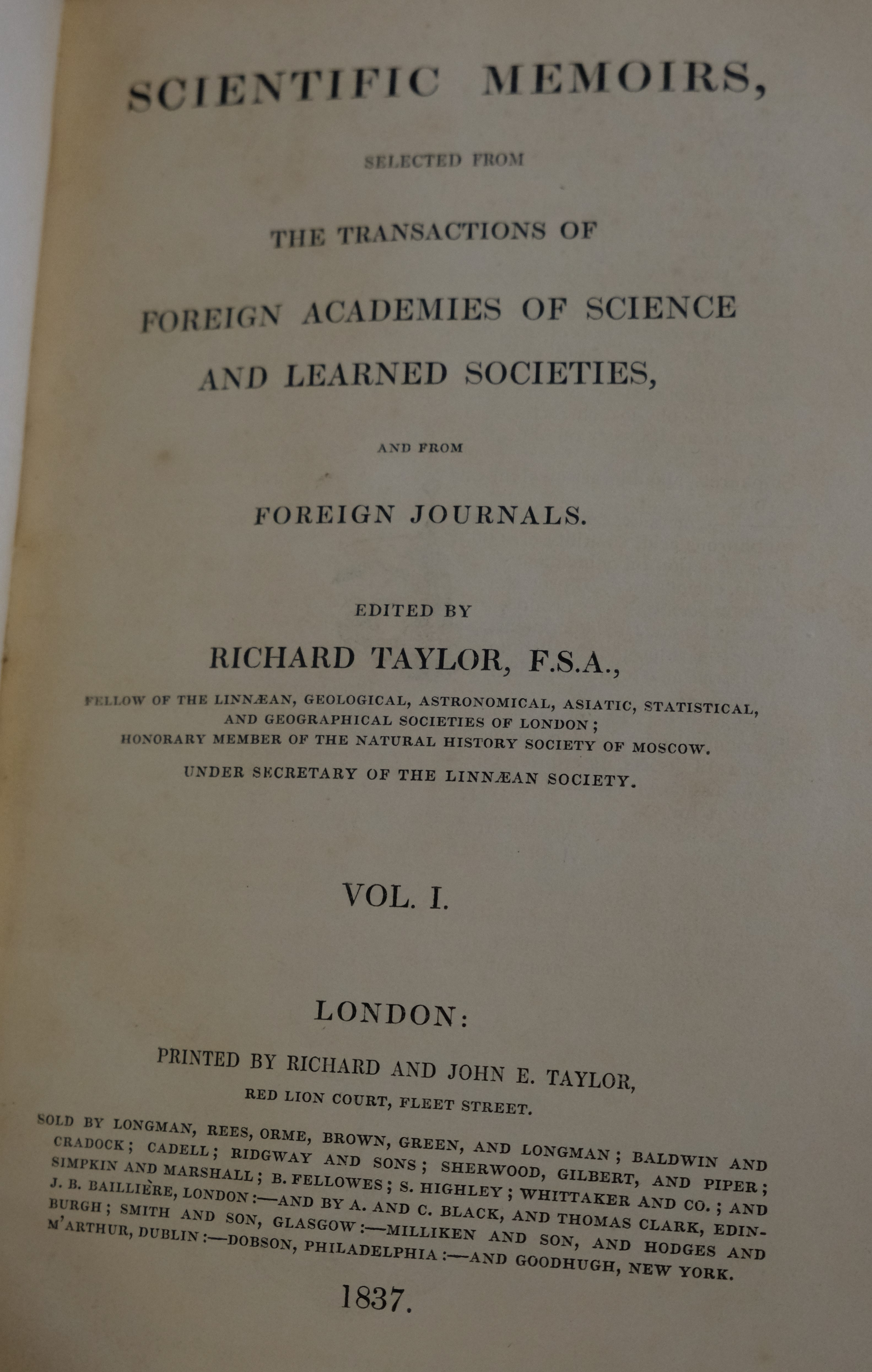
- Author: Richard Taylor
- Publication date: 1837-1852
- Publication place: England

Scientific Memoirs, Selected from the Transactions of Foreign Academies of science and Learned Societies and from Foreign Journals was a series of books edited and published by Richard Taylor (1781–1858) in London between 1837 and 1852.

After 1852 the publication continued in two series: Natural Philosophy, edited by J. Tyndall and William Francis; and, Natural history, edited by Arthur Henfrey and Thomas Henry Huxley.

Volume 3 (1843) is noteworthy because it contained Ada Lovelace's notes appended to her translation of Luigi Federico Menabrea's article. Both are available on Wikisource.

- The Menebrea article
- The notes by Ada Lovelace.

Some volumes have been reprinted by Johnson Reprint Corp. New York in 1966.

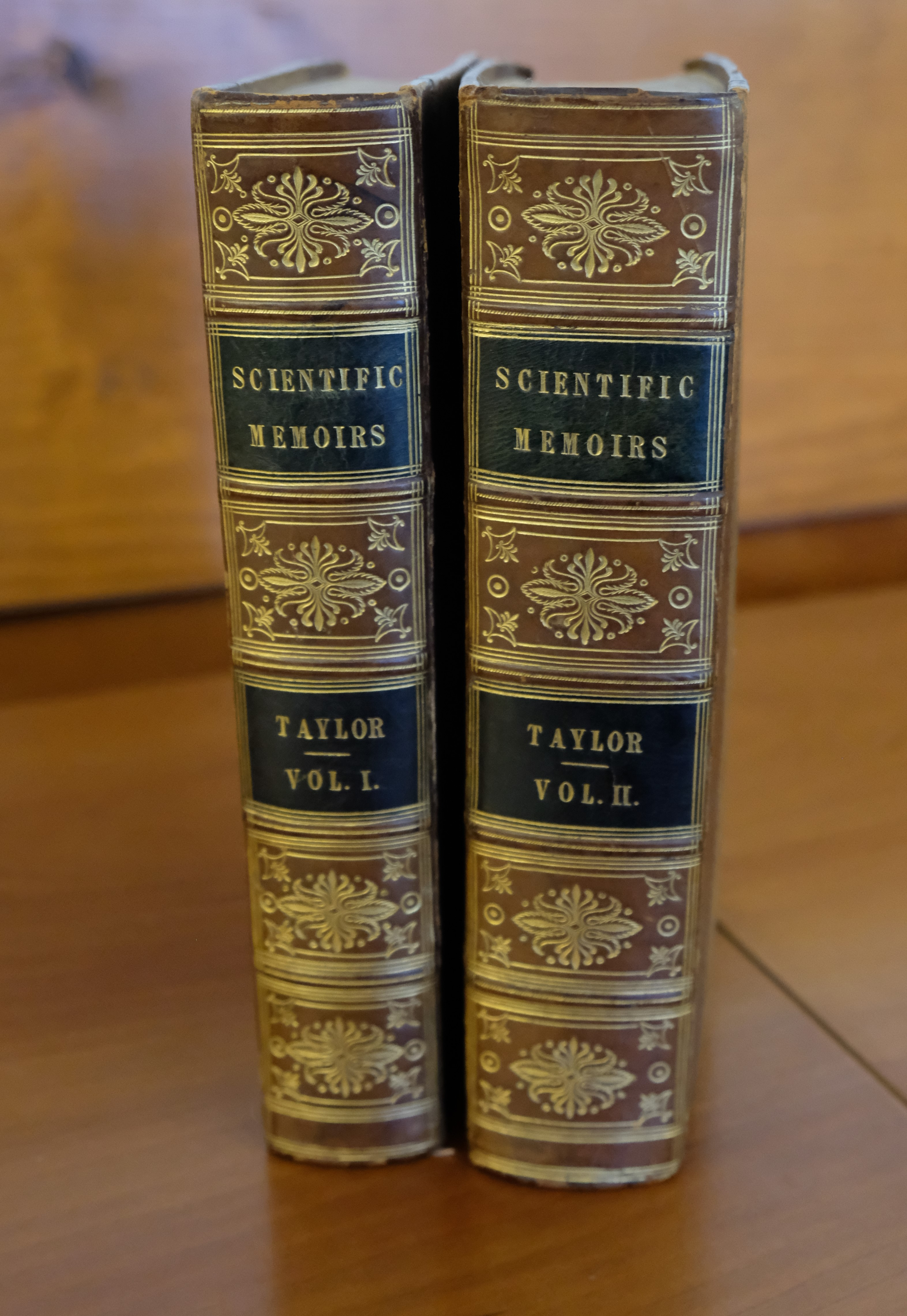
Volume I and II of Scientific Memoirs (1841)

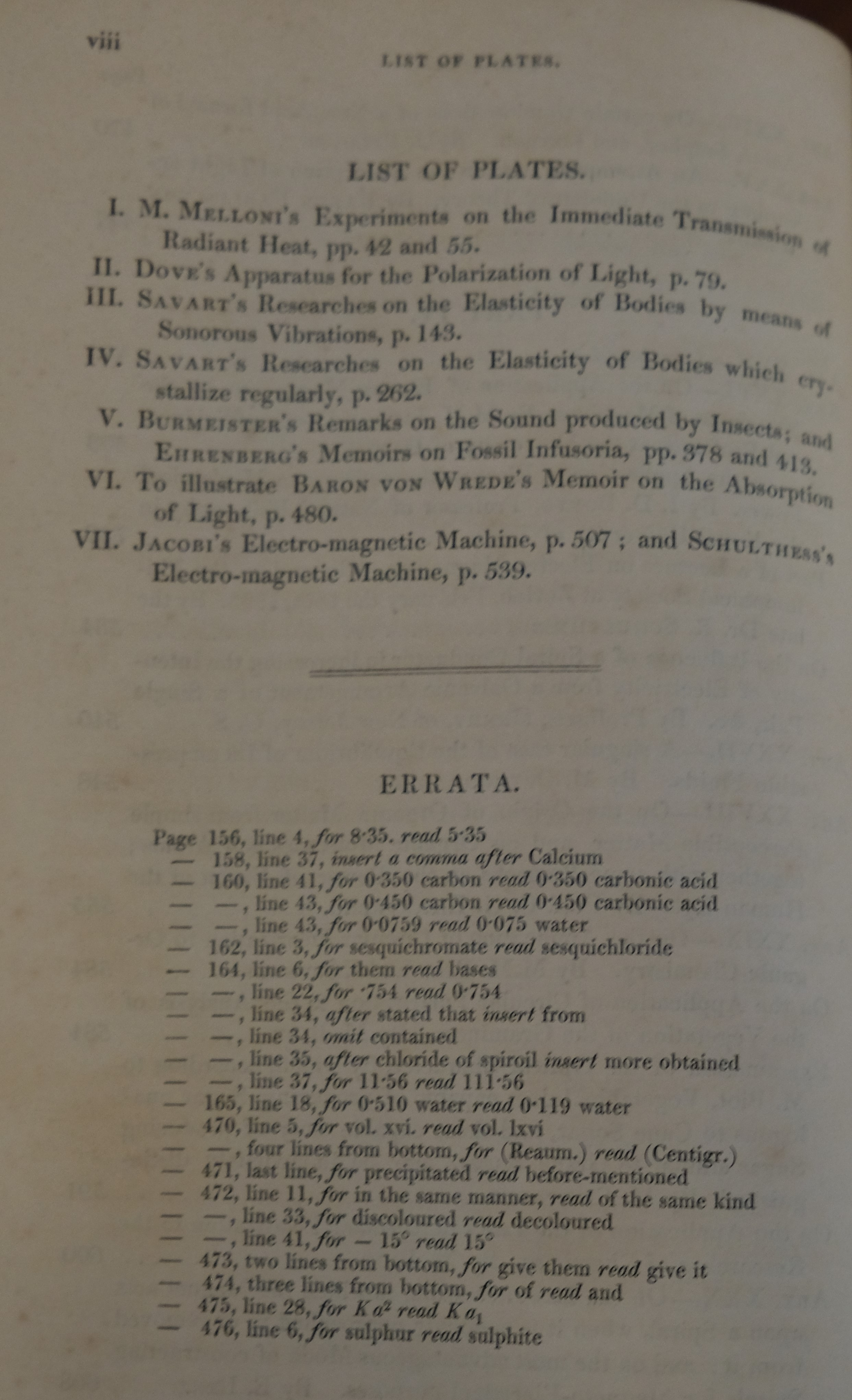
List of figures in volume I of Scientific Memoirs (1841)

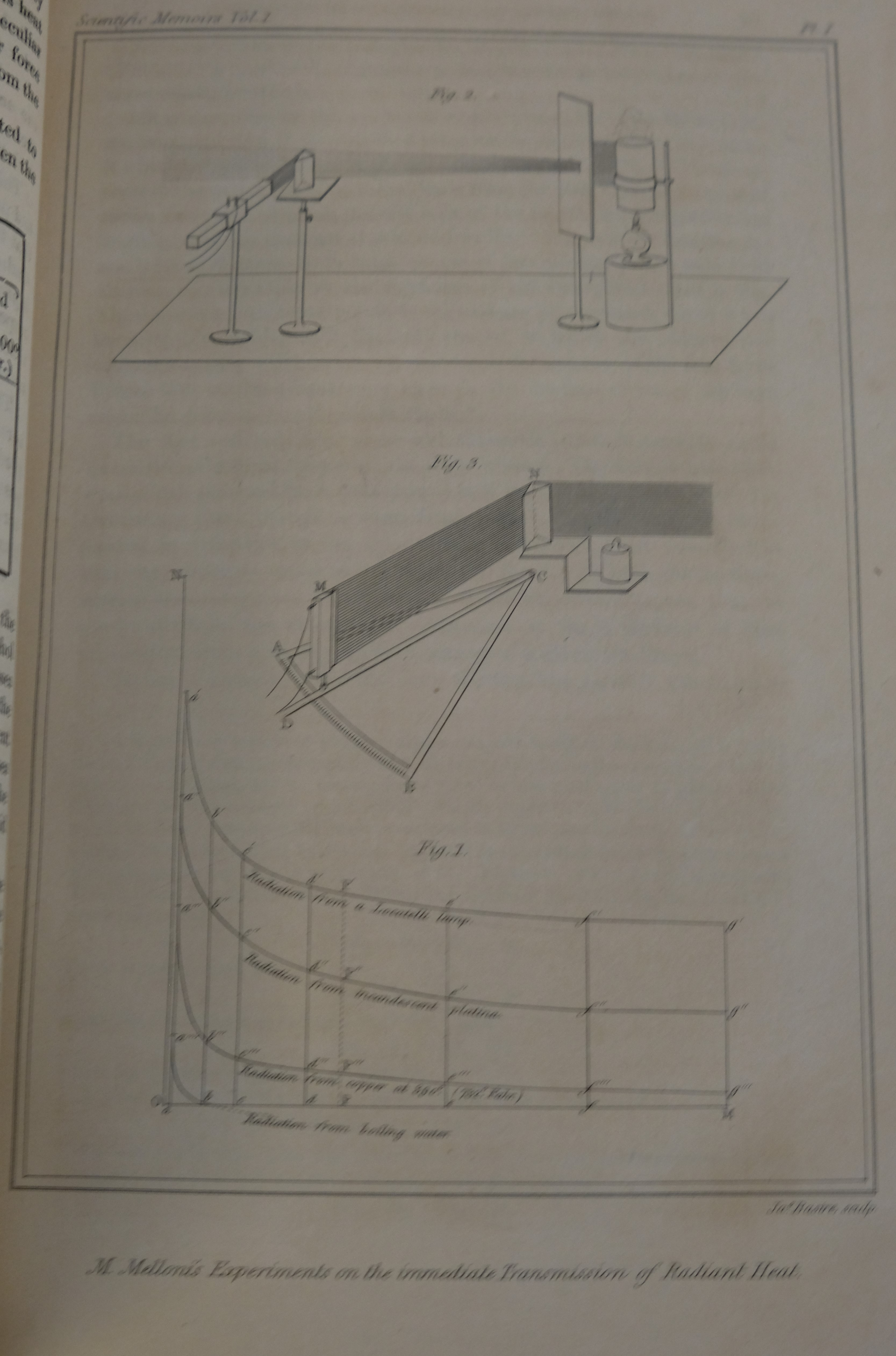
Figure in volume I of Scientific Memoirs (1841)

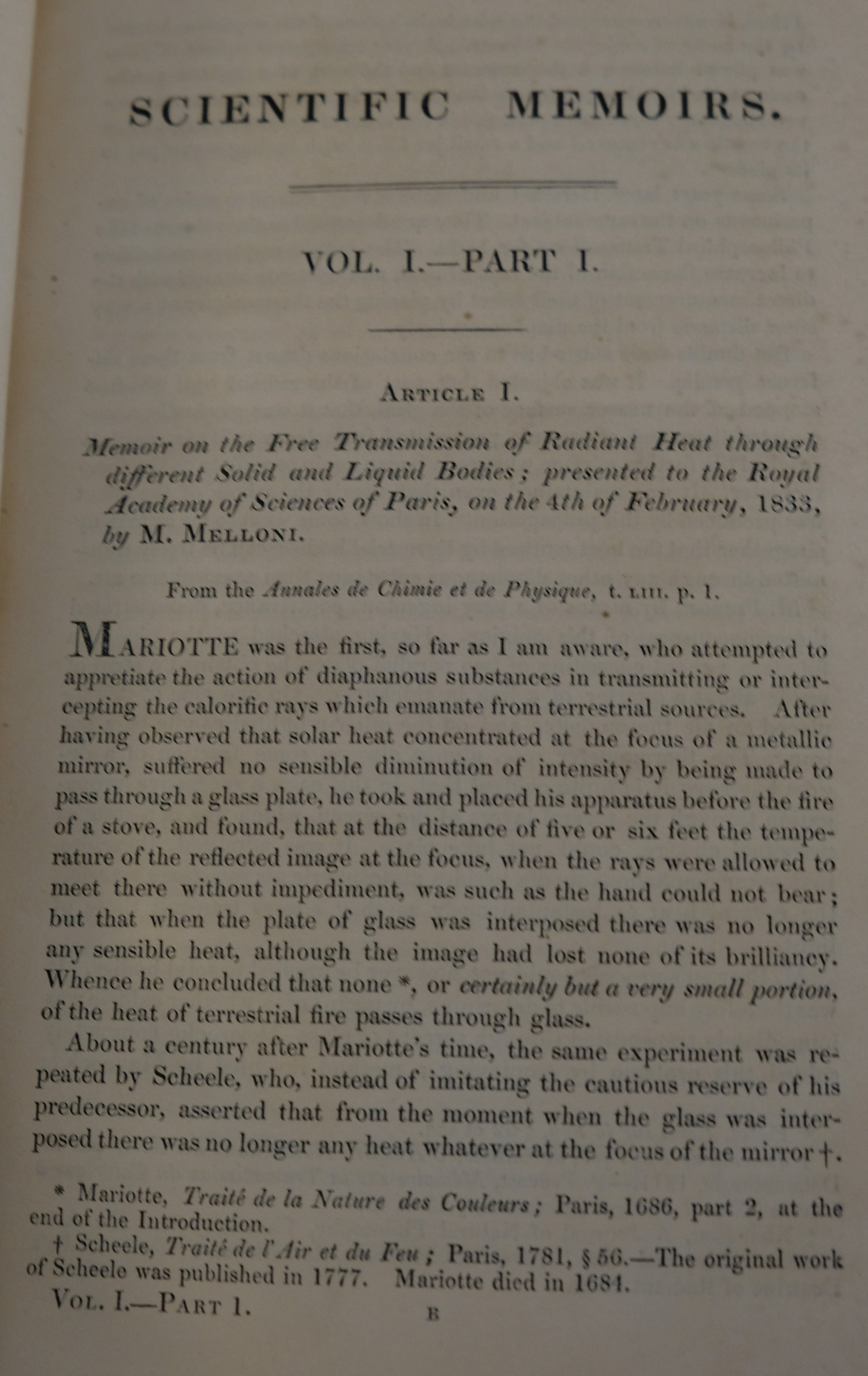
First page of volume I of Scientific Memoirs (1841)
