= Richard Taylor (editor) =

English naturalist and magazine publisher

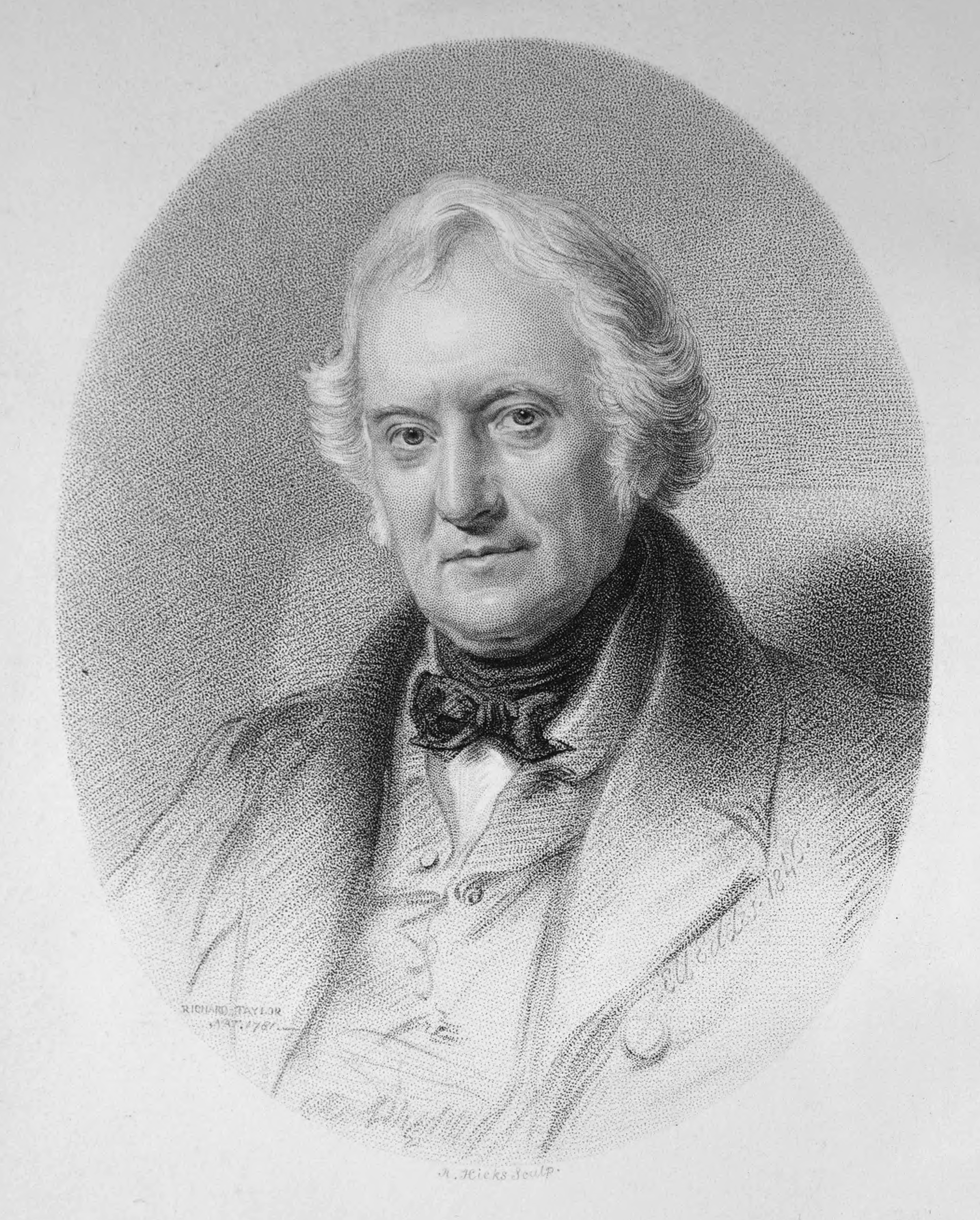
- Born: 18 May 1781; Norwich, England
- Died: 1 December 1858 (aged 77); Richmond, Surrey, England

Richard Taylor (18 May 1781 – 1 December 1858) was an English naturalist and publisher of scientific journals. He became joint editor of the Philosophical Magazine in 1822 and went on to publish the Annals of Natural History in 1838. From 1837 to 1852, he edited and published Scientific Memoirs, Selected from the Transactions of Foreign Academies of Science. In 1852, he was joined by the chemist Dr William Francis to form Taylor & Francis.

== Life ==
Richard Taylor was born at Norwich on 18 May 1781, the second son of John Taylor. He was educated in a day school in that town by the Rev. John Houghton. He was then apprenticed, on the recommendation of Sir James Edward Smith, to a printer named Davis, of Chancery Lane, London. He studied the classics, mediæval Latin and Italian poets, and modern languages.

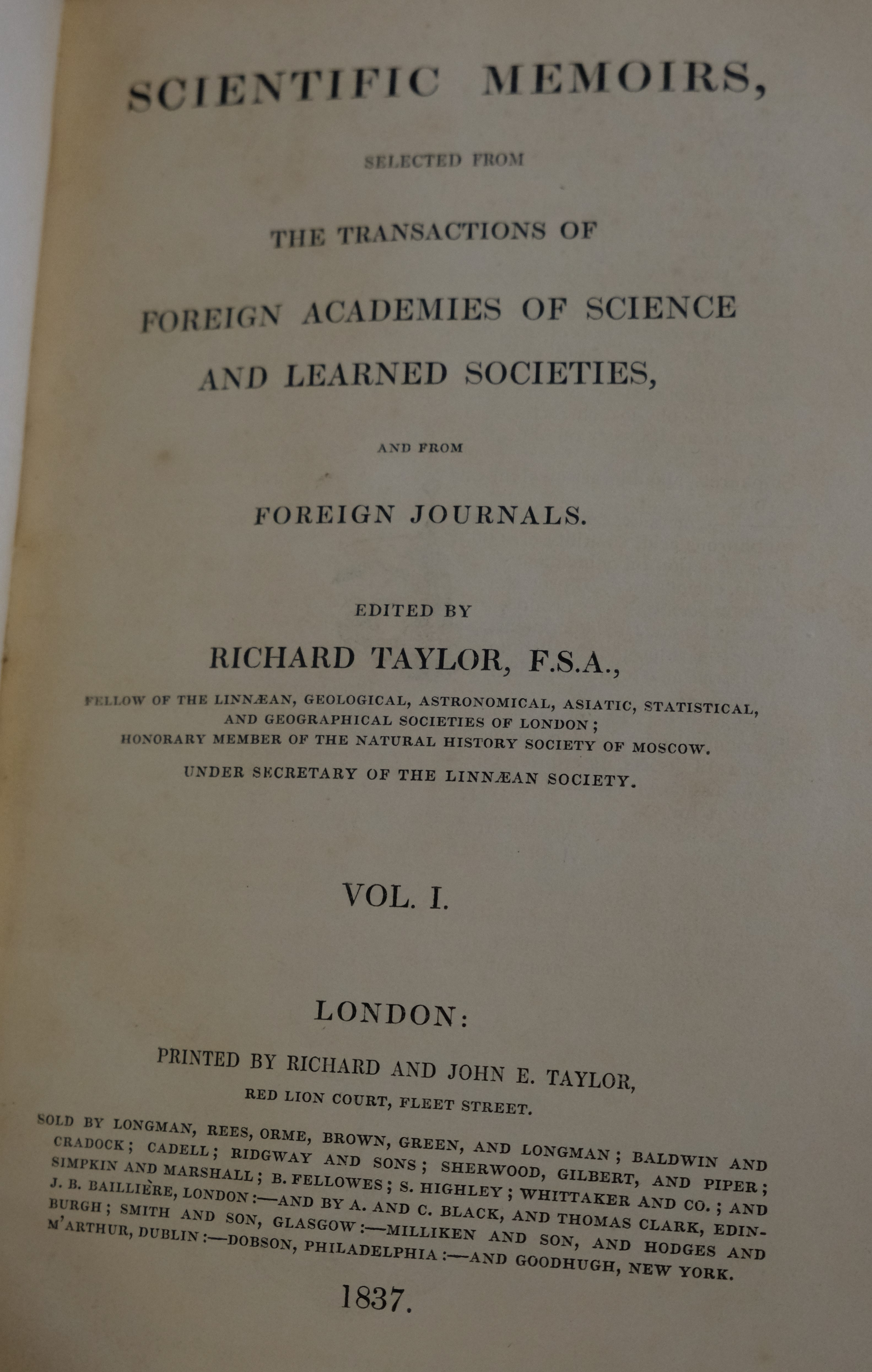
Title page to volume I of Taylor's Scientific Memoirs (1841)

On the expiration of his apprenticeship, he for a short time carried on a printing business in partnership with a Mr. Wilks in Chancery Lane; but on 18 May 1803 Taylor established himself in partnership with his father in Blackhorse Court, Fleet Street, subsequently removing to Shoe Lane, and finally to Red Lion Court, Fleet Street, where the firm ultimately developed into Taylor & Francis. His younger brother Arthur was his partner from 1814 to 1823, and his nephew, John Edward Taylor, joined him from 1837 to 1851, Dr. William Francis, subsequently head of the firm, becoming his partner in the following year. Taylor and his partners produced major works in natural history, as well as fine editions of the classics.

In 1807, he became a fellow of the Linnean Society, and in 1810 was elected a secretary. He was also a Fellow of the Society of Antiquaries and of the Astronomical and Philological societies, and was an original member of the British Association.

In 1822, he joined Alexander Tilloch as editor of the Philosophical Magazine, subsequently the London, Edinburgh, and Dublin Philosophical Magazine. He established the Annals of Natural History in 1838, with which the Magazine of Natural History was incorporated in 1841, and the two were carried on as the Annals and Magazine of Natural History.

For 35 years, Taylor represented the ward of Farringdon Without on the council of the City of London. He took an active part in matters of education, and assisted in founding the City of London School and the corporation library, while he promoted the establishment of the London University (later University College, London). In 1852 his health gave way, and he retired to Richmond, Surrey, where he died on 1 December 1858. He is buried in St Peter's Church, Petersham.

== Works ==
Taylor also edited and issued five volumes between 1837 and 1852 of Scientific Memoirs selected from the Transactions of foreign Academies of Science, as well as an edition of Thomas Warton's History of English Poetry, 1840. In addition, he edited Joseph Priestley's Lectures on History, 1826, John Horne Tooke's Ἐπεα πτερόεντα, 1829 and 1840, and contributed to Jonathan Boucher's Glossary of Archaic and Provincial Words, 1832.

== Quotes ==
Mythology is the natural measure of the unenlightened mind; it contains the aspirings of the soul after higher objects, which are beyond its reach, and its efforts to realize the dim images faintly formed in the mind, as the man wandering in darkness strives to give shape to the objects indistinctly seen to connect them together.
