= Schloss Scharfenberg =

Coordinates: 51.1252°N 13.5275°E

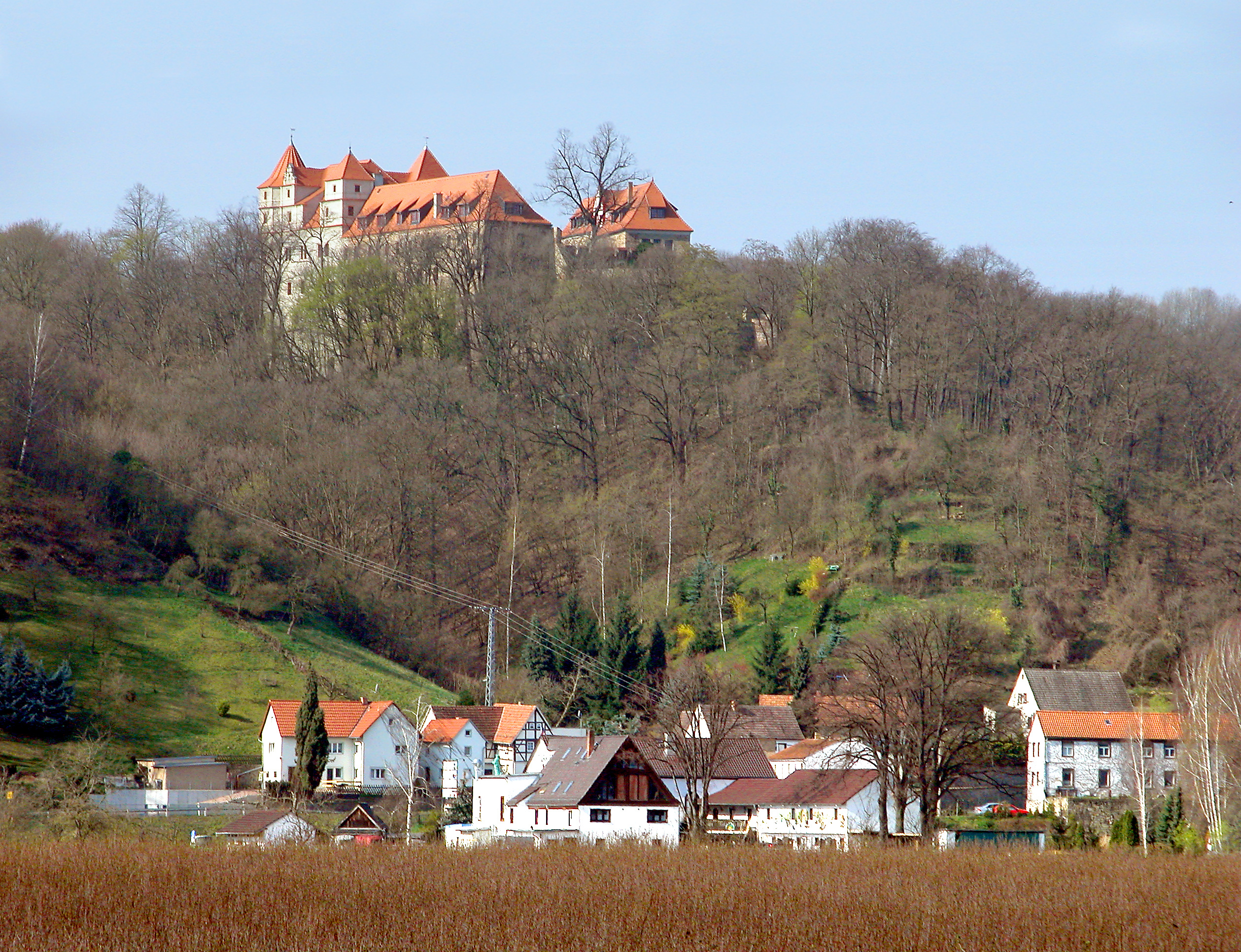
Schloss Scharfenberg, from the River Elbe

Schloss Scharfenberg, Saxony is a medieval castle on the southern slopes of the River Elbe mid-way between Dresden and Meissen. It lies in the Pegenau area of Klipphausen municipality, Meissen, Saxony.

The castle has a panoramic view over the Elbe valley. It has a long-established link to many artists as a Romantic subject. It is currently (2023) run partly as a hotel, taking advantage of its romantic location and atmosphere.

== History ==
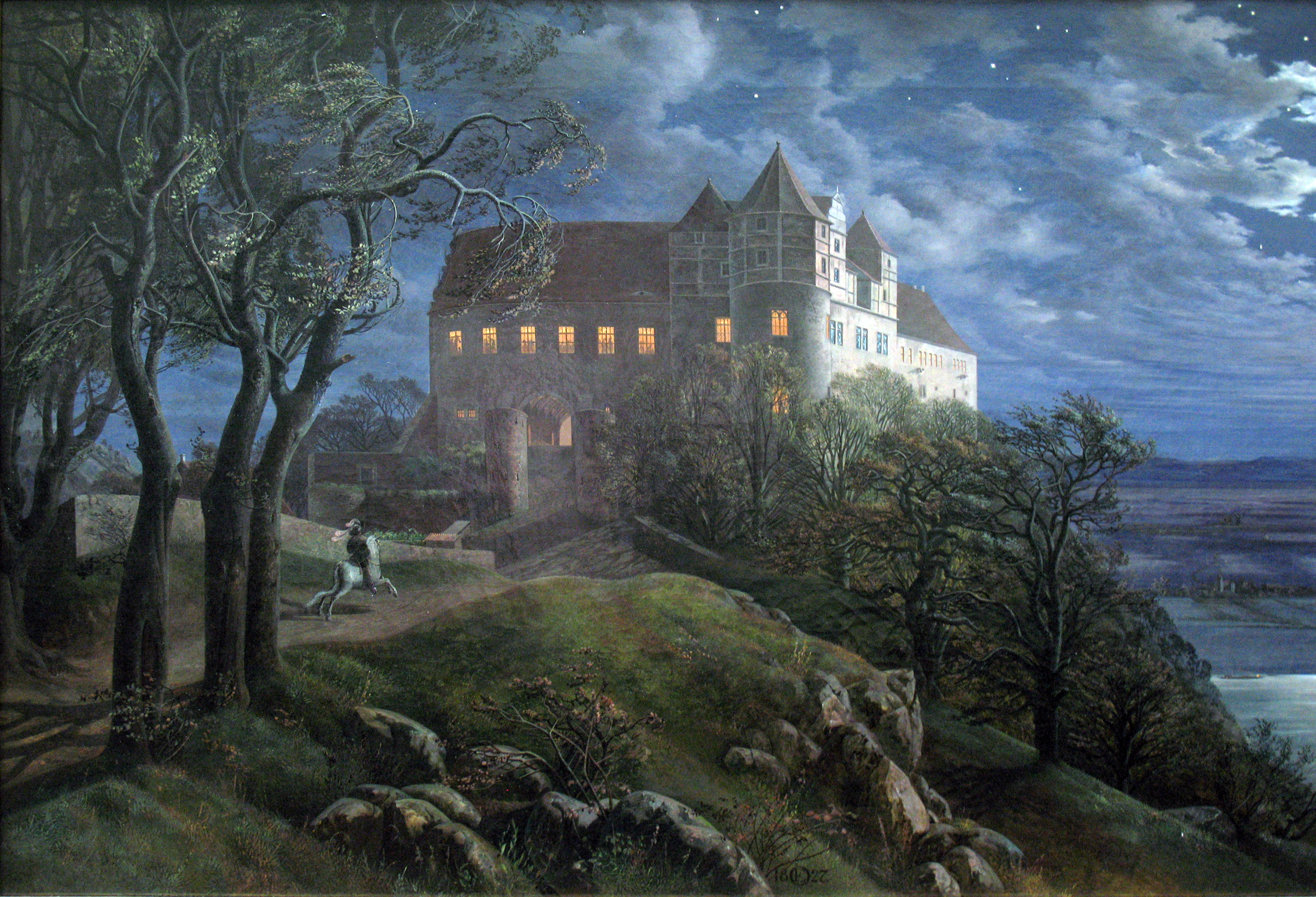
Schloss Scharfenberg, by Ernst Ferdinand Oehme, 1827

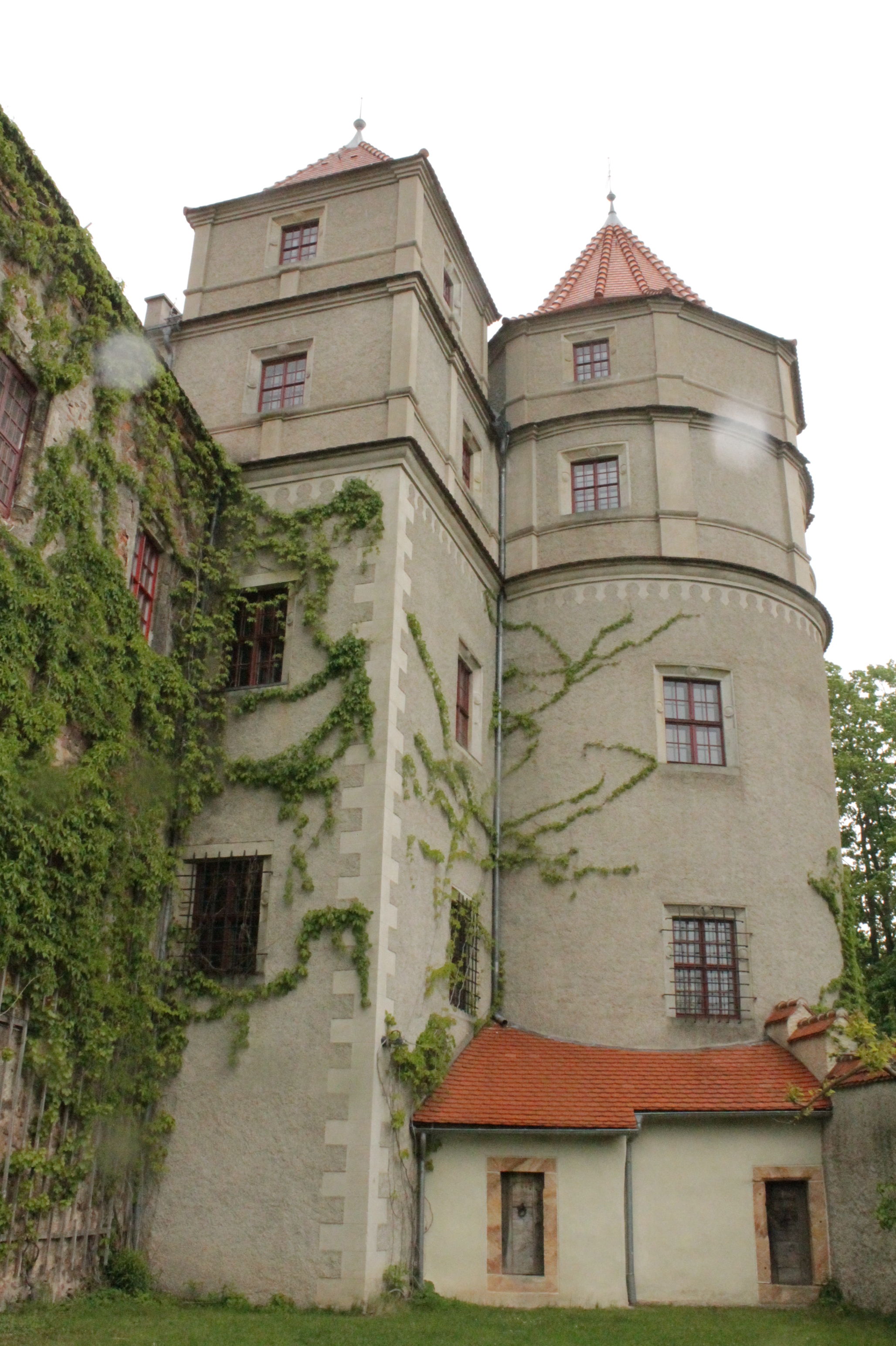
The south-west tower

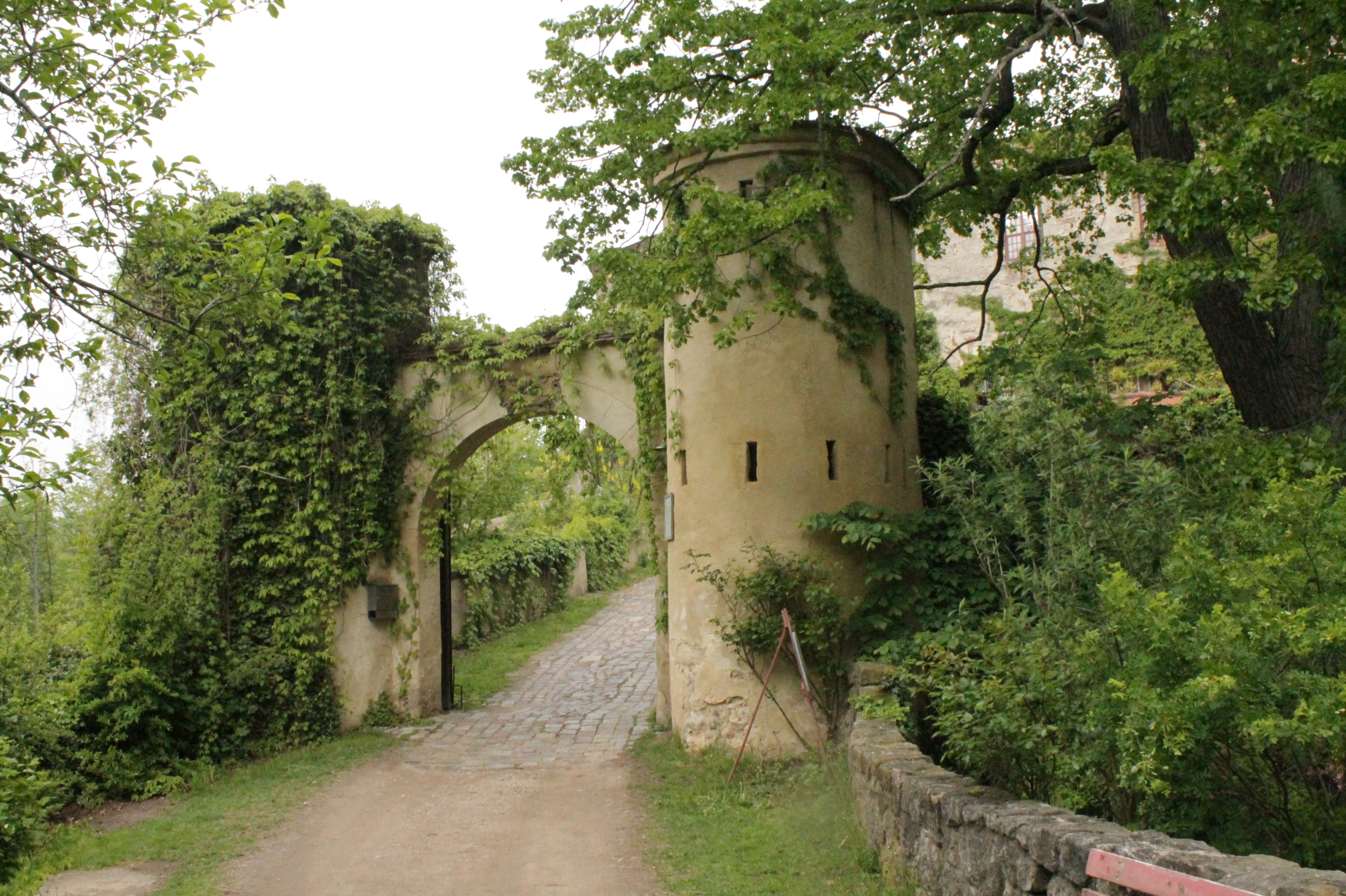
Lower entrance gate from 1200

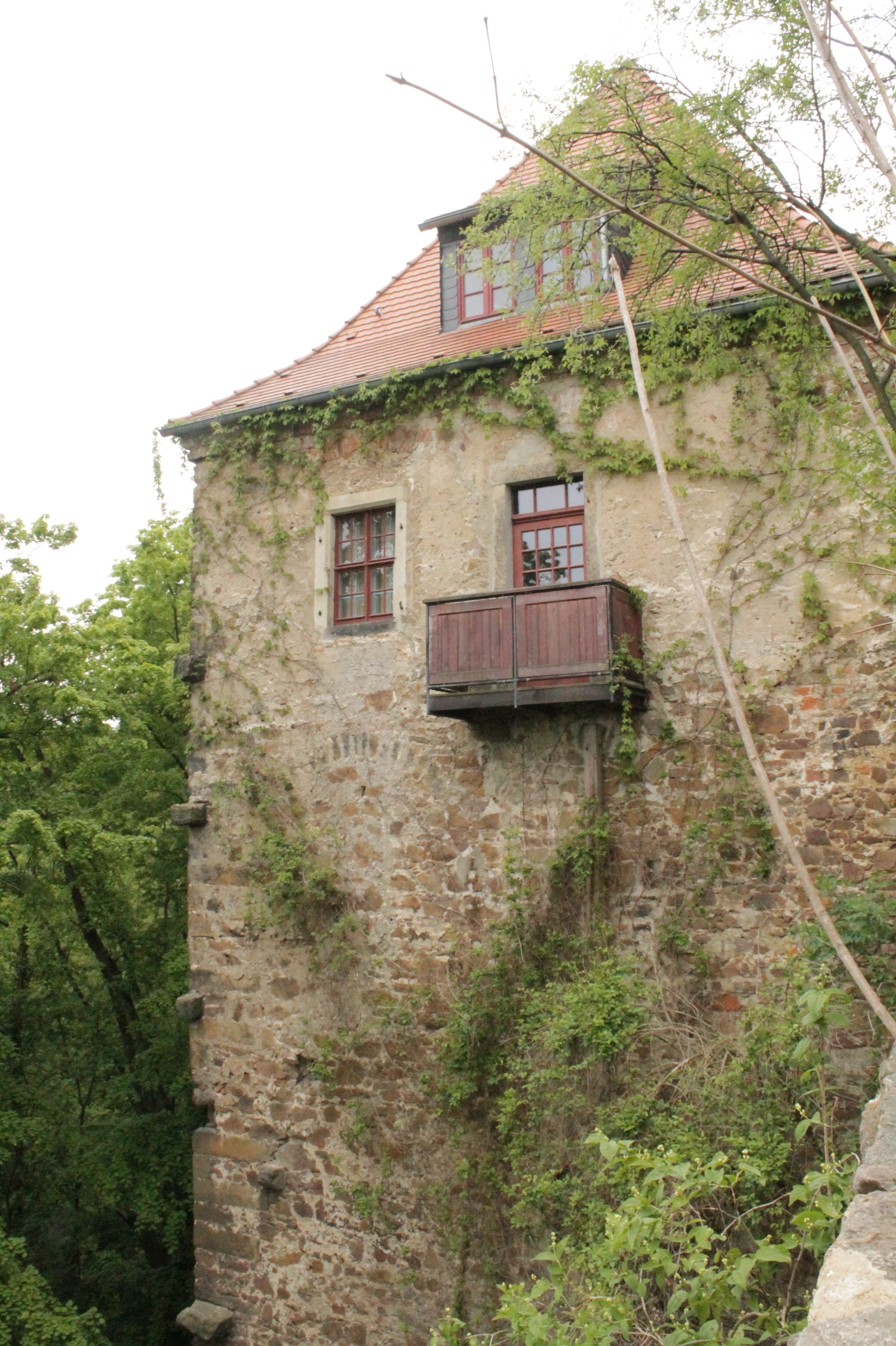
South-east tower

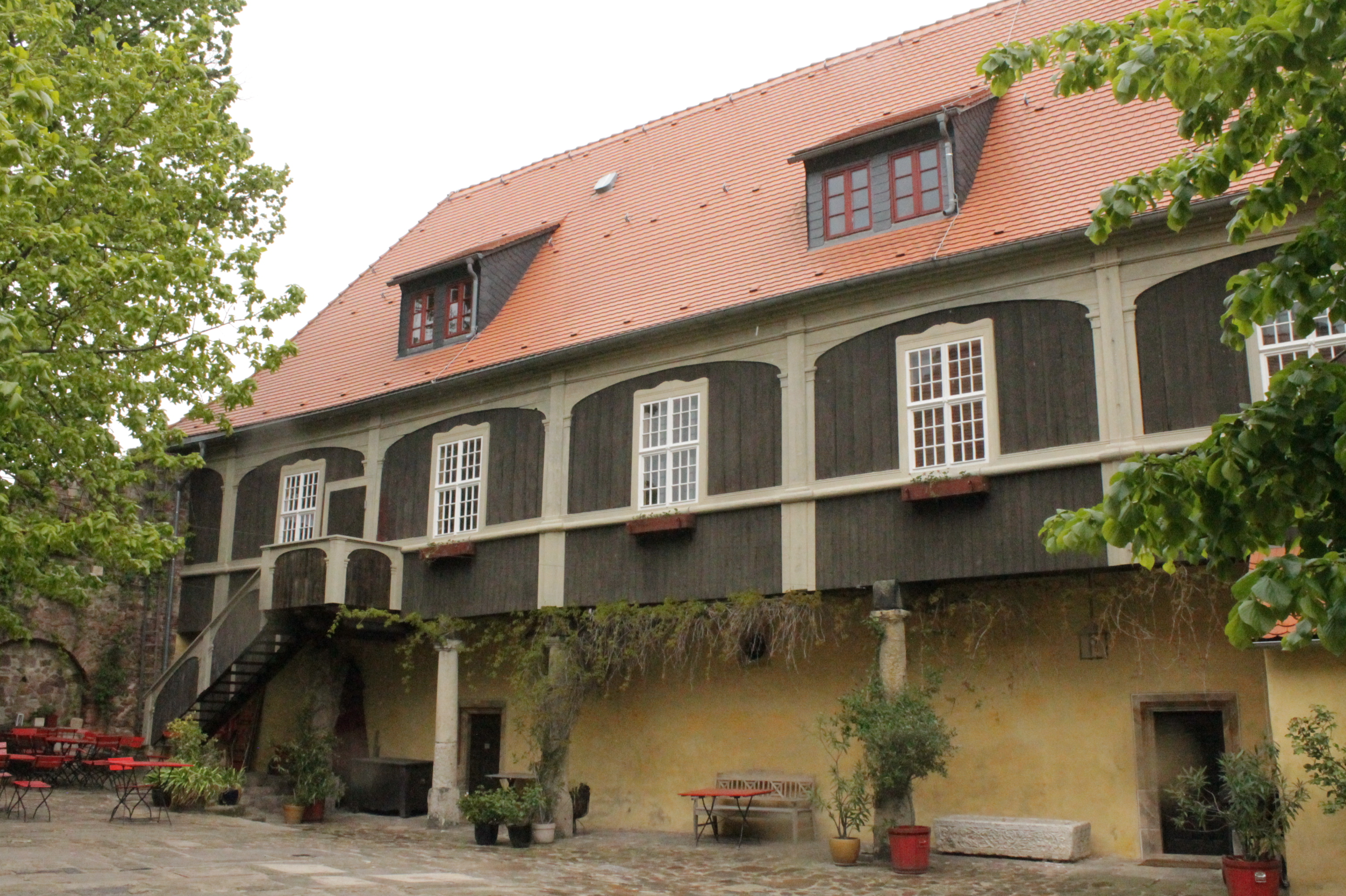
South range

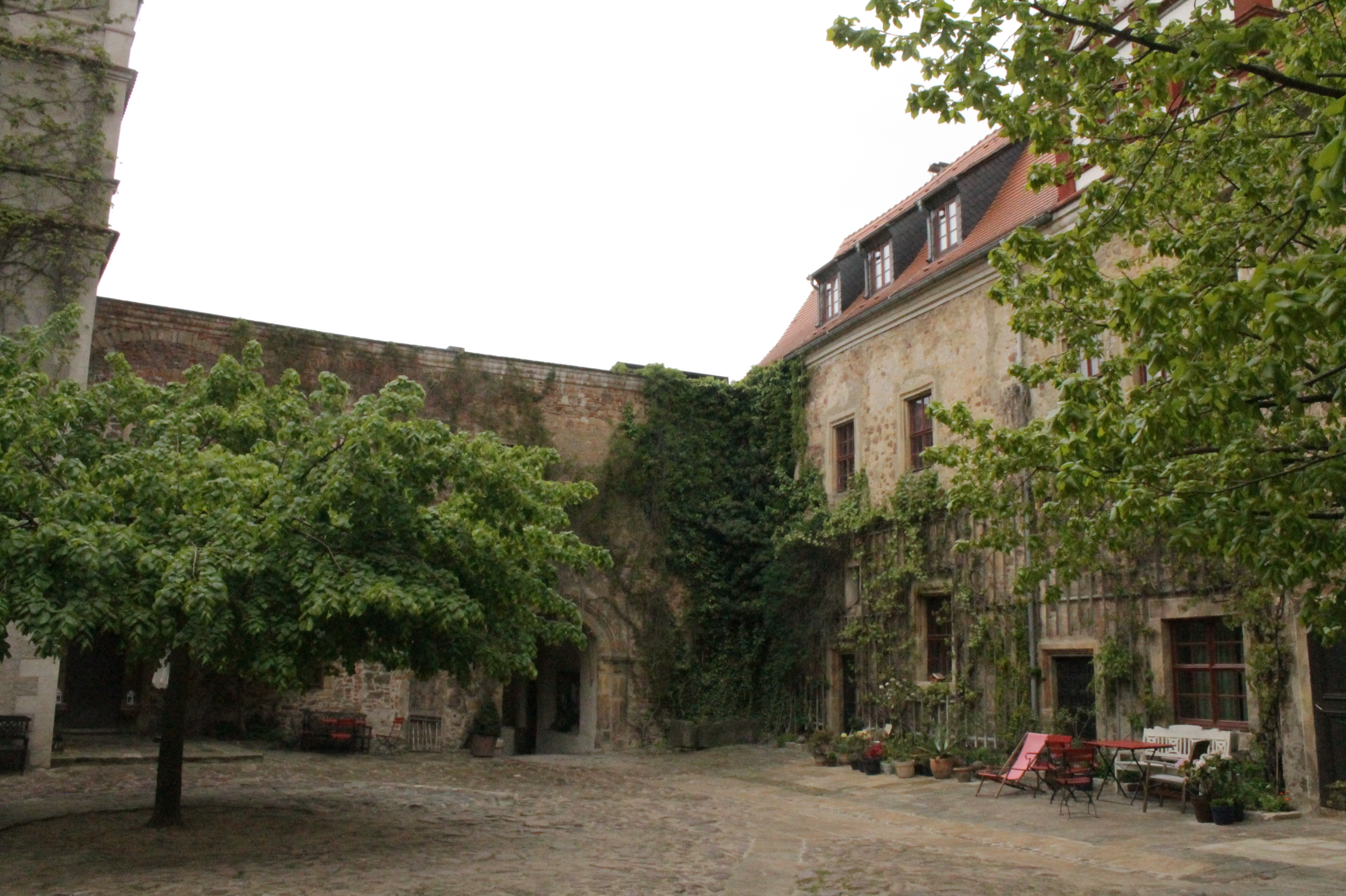
West and south range, Schloss Scharfenberg, Saxony

Some 19th century records link the castle to Henry the Fowler and dates it from 938 A.D. However, there is no evidence to support this claim.

The original castle dates from around 1200 A.D. of which some of the western boundary walls and entrance gate remain. Archaeological digs found a circular keep to the west, dating from 1220. The castle is first mentioned in 1227 in a church document in Meissen and it is in the control of the Bishop of Meissen.

In 1390 it is controlled by Bernhard von Maltitz and in 1403 Dietrich von Miltitz. The castle remained in the ownership and control of the Von Miltitz family until the Second World War. During this time the castle was badly damaged in the Thirty Years War. As a result, large sections of the inner castle date from the late 17th century.

The castle was again besieged and successfully defended against the Swedish army in 1706 during the Great Nordic War.

In 1783 an accidental fire destroyed the timber built north side of the courtyard. The timber-built south side survives.

In the early 19th century, during the period of the Grand Tour, Scharfenberg became an established Romantic destination, and the architecture was altered to enhance this Romantic image. In the first quarter of the century, under Dietrich von Miltitz and then Carl Borromäus von Miltitz, several leading literary figures of the time gathered there, forming the "Scharfenberger Circle", including Novalis, Christian Gottfried Körner, Friedrich de la Motte Fouqué, Johann August Apel and E. T. A. Hoffmann. During this period the Von Miltitz family were also great patrons of artists and several famous artists were commissioned to paint the castle. These included Ernst Ferdinand Oehme, Thomas Fearnley, Johan Christian Clausen Dahl and Caspar David Friedrich.

For various reasons the castle fell empty during the Second World War. It was occupied by various persons displaced by the war in a hostel fashion and was under state control under the Soviet regime. This continued into the 1950s. Although the castle is relatively large it is far from any city and is not a good area to house workers.

In the 1960s it opened as a museum, but was generally only of local interest in relation to its neighbouring cities. It still had a residential function and an artist community linked itself to the building, also keen to preserve the castle. These included Achim Freyer, Emil Nolde, Achim Heym, Andreas Reinhardt, Karl-Heinz-Schäfer and Otto Walchau.

Through the 1970s and 1980s it was used for civil defence purposes, partly due to its strategic views over the River Elbe.

At the reunification of Germany in 1989 all state functions ceased. It was sold privately.

Since 2007 it has housed an annual festival of Romantic poetry.
