= Klipphausen =

- Municipality
- Location of Klipphausen within Meißen district
- Interactive map of Klipphausen
- Location within Germany Location within Saxony
- Coordinates: 51°5′N 13°32′E
- Country: Germany
- State: Saxony
- District: Meißen
- Subdivisions: 23

Government
  - Mayor (2019–26): Mirko Knöfel

Area
  - Total: 111.56 km^{2} (43.07 sq mi)
- Elevation: 260 m (850 ft)

Population (2025-12-31)
  - Total: 10,245
  - Density: 91.834/km^{2} (237.85/sq mi)
- Time zone: UTC+01:00 (CET)
  - Summer (DST): UTC+02:00 (CEST)
- Postal codes: 01665
- Dialling codes: 0351, 03521, 035204, 035244
- Vehicle registration: MEI, GRH, RG, RIE
- Website: klipphausen.de

Klipphausen is a municipality in the district of Meißen, in Saxony, Germany.

Schloss Scharfenberg is located in the Pegenau area of Klipphausen.

Julius Adolph Stöckhardt, who helped to establish agricultural chemistry in Germany, was born in what is today the locality of Röhrsdorf. He initiated the establishment of agricultural experiment stations and was a pioneer of environmental research.

== Sons and daughters of the community ==
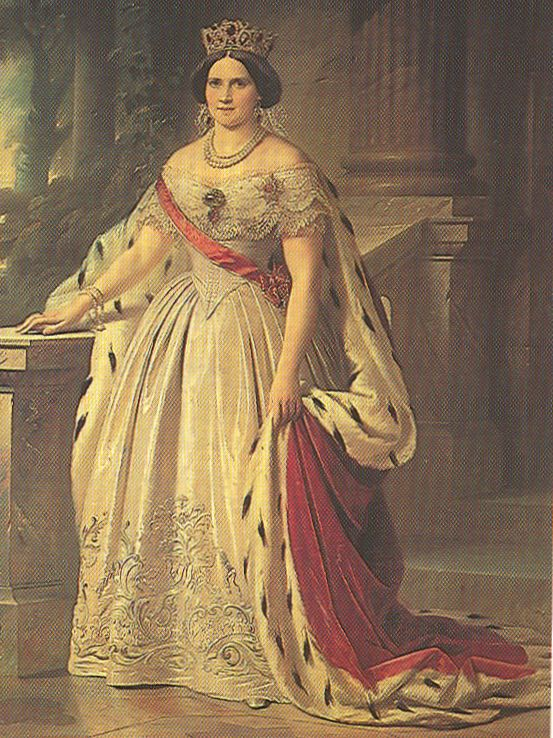
Princess Augusta Reuss of Köstritz

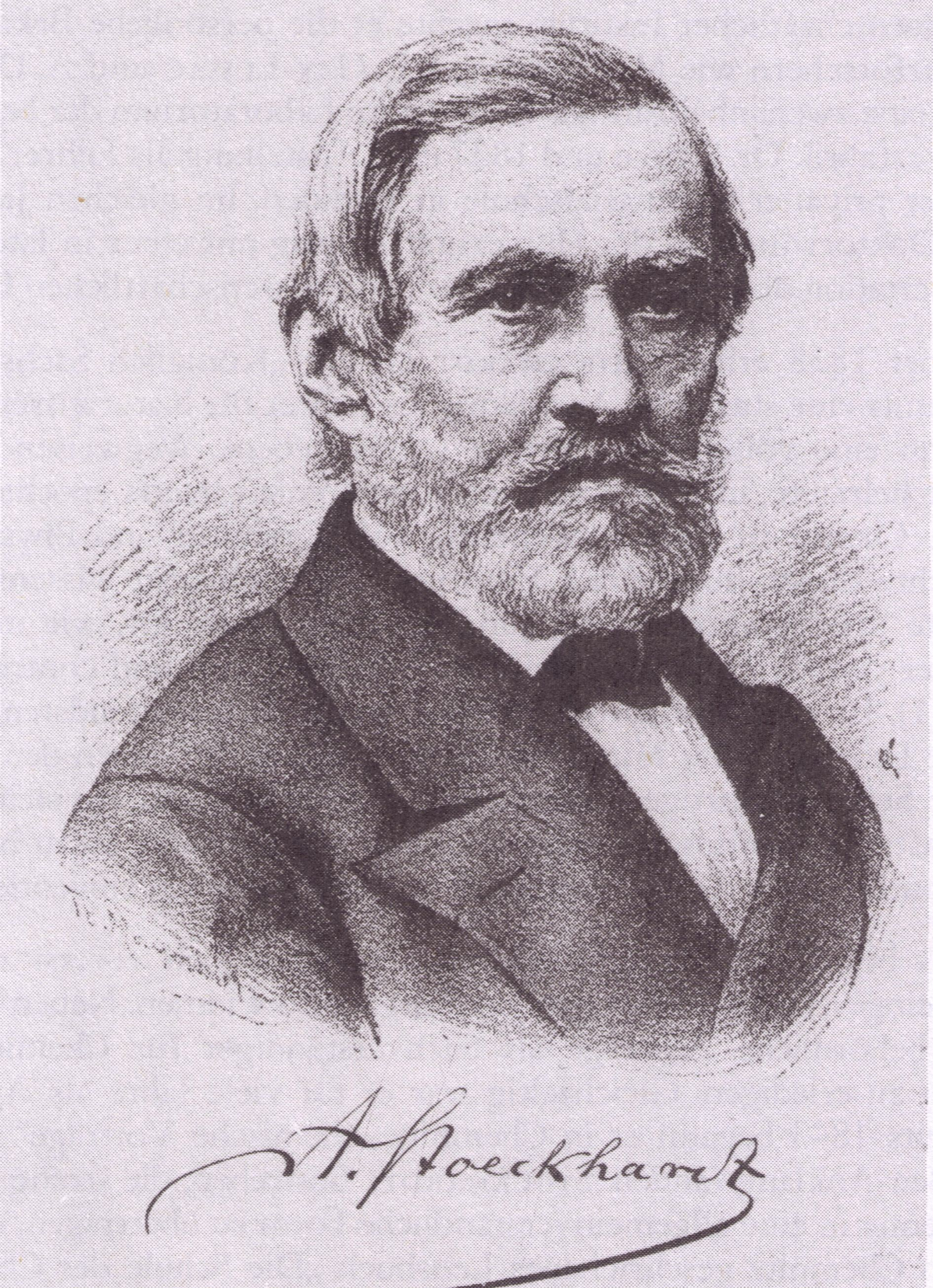
Julius Adolph Stöckhardt

- Johann Gottfried Köhler (1745-1801), astronomer
- Princess Augusta Reuss of Köstritz (1822–1862), Grand Duchess of Mecklenburg
- Heinrich VII, Prince Reuss of Köstritz (1825–1906), diplomat
- Julius Adolph Stöckhardt (1809–1886), agricultural engineer
- Erhard Siedel (1895–1979), actor and theater actor
- Wulf Kirsten (born 1934), lyric poet
- Dieter Wendisch (born 1953), rower, Olympic champion 1976 and 1980
