= John William Griffith =

British architect (1789–1855)

John William Griffith (1789–1855) was an English architect and surveyor.

== Career ==
=== Surveyor ===
From his office at 16 Finsbury Place South, John Griffith held several surveying posts in the City of London and Islington areas: for the London Estates of St John's College, Cambridge and James Rhodes, and for the Parish of St Botolph, Aldersgate (the church of which he may have enlarged and enhanced circa 1830). In Islington, for the James Rhodes Estate, in the 1820s, he prepared the schedules, petitions and plans for development in the Duncan Terrace area.

=== Architect ===
Apart from his plans for Rhodes' houses in Islington, he was also responsible for the design of many houses in Hornsey, Kentish Town and Highgate as well as the Islington Parochial Schools (1815) and the South Islington Proprietary School, in a classical style (1836).

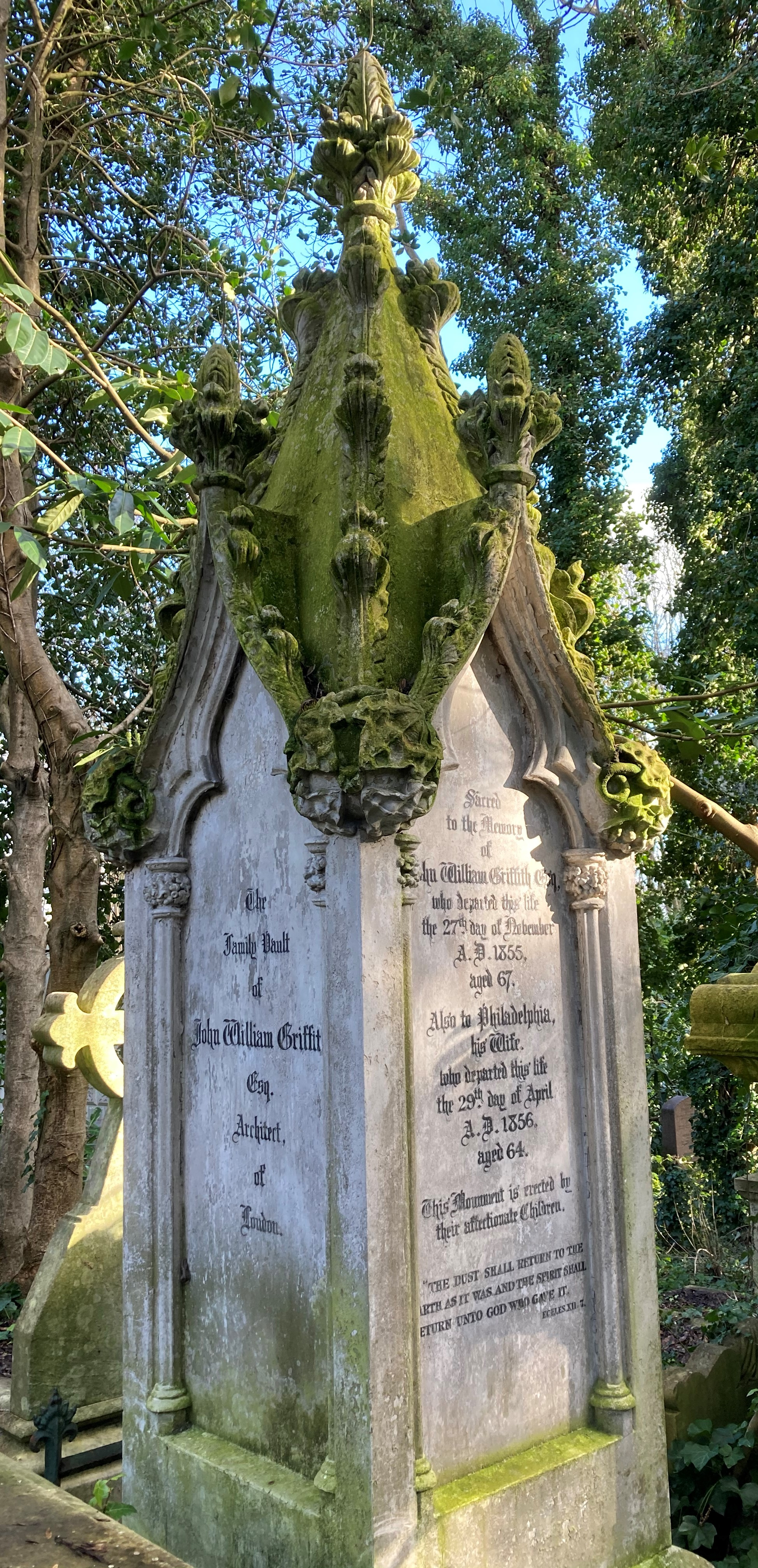
Family vault of Griffith in Highgate Cemetery

The Greek Revival architecture of the principal buildings of Cemetery of All Souls, Kensal Green have been attributed to John William Griffith, however they are almost certainly designed by John Griffith of Finsbury (1796-1888), who was one of the three architect shareholders of the General Cemetery Company (the others were A.C.Pugin and Thomas Willson). John Griffith of Finsbury was initially responsible for the overall layout and planting of the grounds, including the surrounding wall and railings.

== Family ==
The architect and antiquarian William Pettit Griffith was his son.
