= Henry William Henfrey =

British numismatist

Henry William Henfrey (1852–1881) was an English numismatist.

== Life ==
Born in London on 5 July 1852, he was eldest son of Arthur Henfrey, and was educated at Brighton College. He was prevented by an accident from going on to the University of Oxford.

Henfrey was encouraged in archæological and numismatic studies by Peter Cunningham, Joseph Bonomi the Younger, and Admiral William Henry Smyth. He joined the Numismatic Society of London in 1868, and became a member of the council. He was a foreign member of the Belgian and French numismatic societies, and of several American societies. He was elected a member of the British Archæological Association in 1870.

Henfrey died, after returning from a visit to Italy, on 31 July 1881 at Widmore Cottage, his mother's house at Bromley, Kent.

== Works ==
In 1870 Henfrey published A Guide to the Study of English Coins, London, (2nd edit. by Charles Francis Keary, London, 1885). His major work was Numismata Cromwelliana, London, a full account of the coins, medals, and seals of The Protectorate.

One of his early numismatic writings was a paper in the English Mechanic on Queen Anne's farthings. He contributed to the Numismatic Society's proceedings 12 papers, mainly on English coins and medals, and printed in the Numismatic Chronicle. He also contributed papers to the proceedings of British Archæological Association, especially on the medals of Oliver Cromwell, and on the coins of Bristol and Norwich. At the time of his death he was working on a history of English country mints.

== Notes ==
Attribution

This article incorporates text from a publication now in the public domain: Stephen, Leslie; Lee, Sidney, eds. (1891). "Henfrey, Henry William". Dictionary of National Biography. Vol. 25. London: Smith, Elder & Co.
