= William Esdaile =

British banker

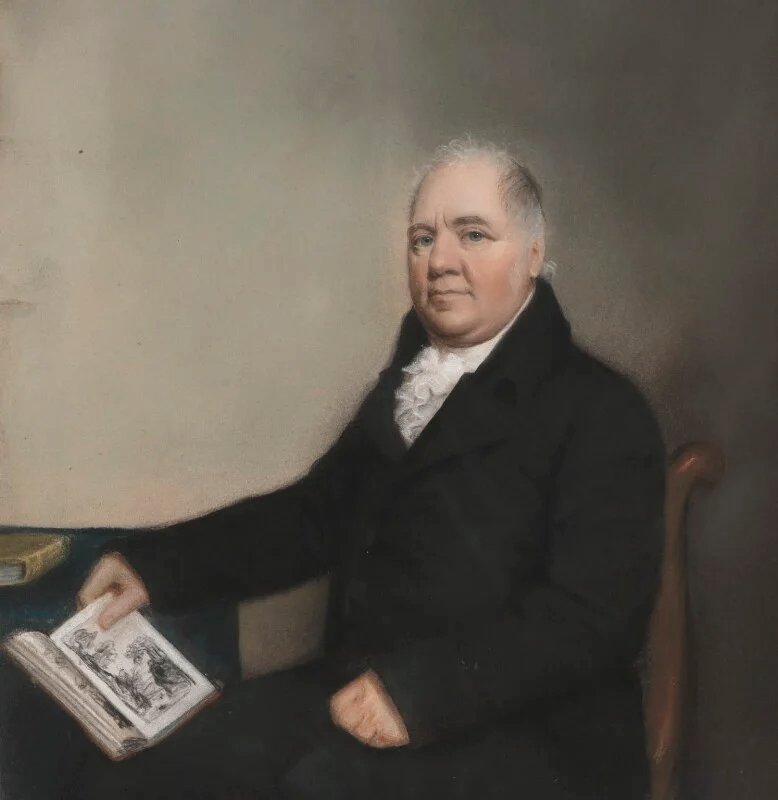
- William Esdaile, pastel portrait, by 1826
- Born: 1758
- Died: 1837 (aged 78–79)
- Occupations: banker, collector
- Father: Sir James Esdaile

William Esdaile (6 February 1758 – 2 October 1837) was an English banker and print collector.

== Business career ==
Esdaile was the fourth son of Sir James Esdaile of Great Gains, Essex, lord mayor of London, by his second wife, Mary Mayor. He received a commercial education, and was placed as a clerk in the banking-house of Ladbrooke & Co. In or about 1780 Sir James Esdaile was induced by his son-in-law, Sir Benjamin Hammet, to found with him a new banking business, and on its formation William Esdaile transferred his services to the house of Esdaile, Hammet, & Co., 21 Lombard Street.

Esdaile's son described his appearance at work in a private journal:

Last but not least in the welfare of the concern came W. Esdaile, the man of business; perched on a high stool he was to be seen intent on the movements of the machine; hardly regarding those who came into the partners' office he was absorbed in his task. He had neither talent nor inclination for conversation on general subjects, and he knew little or nothing of what was passing out of banking hours.

The banking-house, by then known as Esdaile & Hammet, went out of business at the beginning of 1837.

== Collector ==
Esdaile begin as an art collector by relying on advice from the Rev. Thomas Noble and the dealer John Thane. He frequented sales of prints. His earlier purchases were sparing and cheap, but, distrusting his own judgment, he engaged a professional assistant, accompanied by whom he attended all the great auctions in London. Though prints formed the bulk of his collection, he also largely purchased, as opportunity offered, coins, china, books, and the general miscellanea of the sale-room. Towards the last few years of his life, when his mind was breaking up, he abandoned his usual caution, and spent on a large and sometimes reckless scale, greatly to the advantage of his collection, which was considered one of the most valuable in England. It was sold after his death, the sale extending over sixteen days. The chief attractions were the very complete set of Rembrandt etchings and Claude drawings, which Esdaile had bought on the dispersal of Sir Thomas Lawrence's collection, and a large selection from the best work of the early Italian engravers.

In 1825, at the age of 68, Esdaile took his first trip abroad, visiting Italy, and was so pleased with the experiment that he repeated it two years later.

== Last years ==
In 1832, on returning to his home at Clapham from Dover, Esdaile was seized with a dangerous malarial fever. Though he recovered his health, he was never again able to attend to business or to manage his property. He neither read nor wrote, and spent the whole day in overlooking his collection of prints. He passed the winter of 1835–36 at Rome and Naples, but after his return his constitution began to gradually break up. He was confined to his bed for nine months, and, dying at Clapham, 2 October 1837, was buried in Bunhill Fields. Esdaile's portrait was painted by both Wilkie and Lawrence, and an engraving was made from a pastel portrait by George Sharples.

== Family ==
Esdaile married Elizabeth, the only child of Edward Jeffries, treasurer of St. Thomas's Hospital, by whom he had two sons and four daughters. Their youngest daughter Caroline married in 1824 Rees Goring Thomas (1801–1863).

Their grandson, Edward Jeffries Esdaile, married, 27 September 1837, Ianthe Eliza Shelley, the daughter of Percy Bysshe Shelley and Harriet Westbrook.
