= Julius Adolph Stöckhardt =

German chemist (1809–1886)

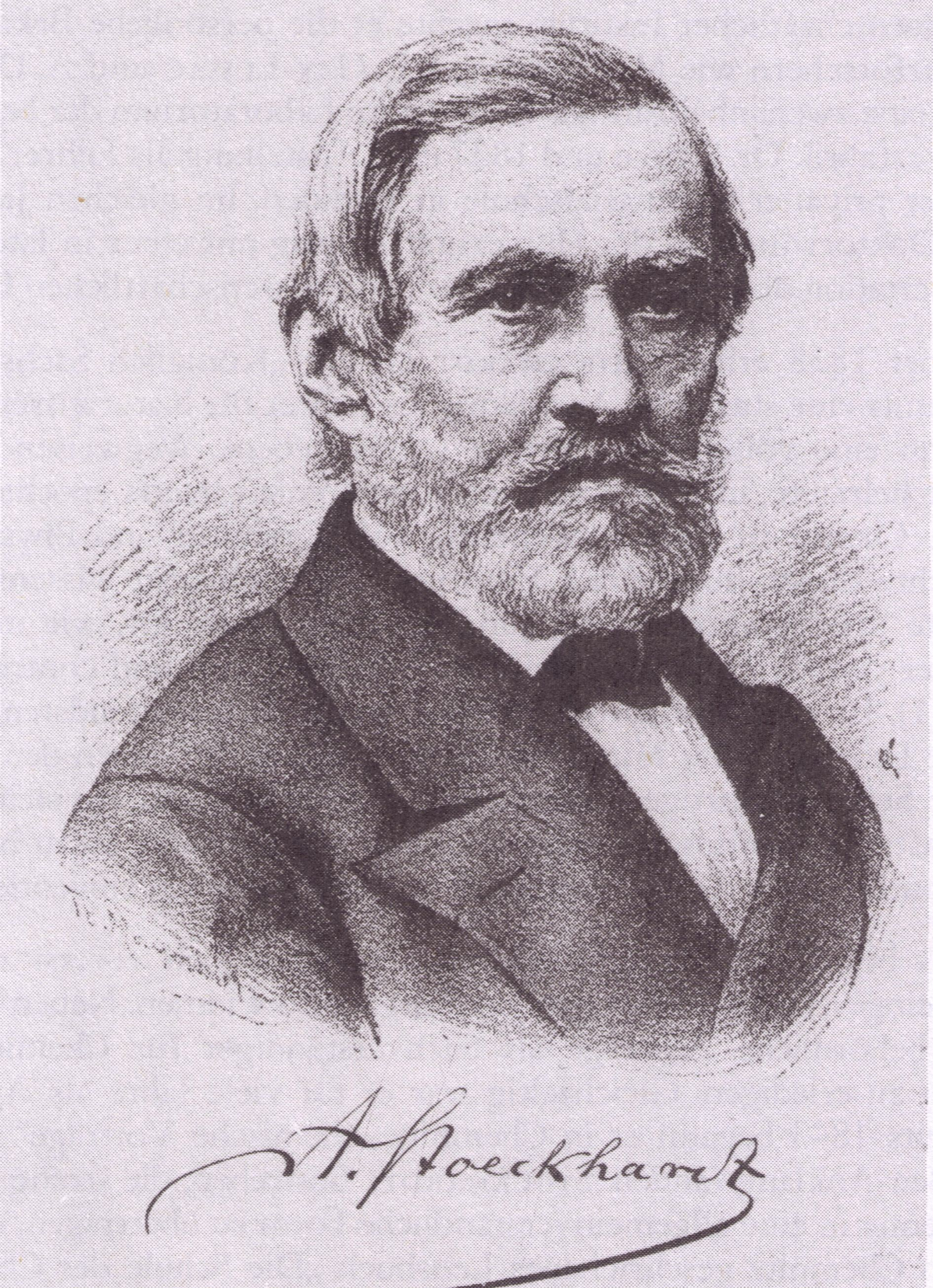
- Julius Adolph Stöckhardt
- Born: 4 January 1809; Röhrsdorf, Kingdom of Saxony
- Died: 1 June 1886 (aged 77); Tharandt, German Empire
- Education: University of Leipzig
- Scientific career
- Doctoral students: Hermann Hellriegel, Julius Sachs

Julius Adolph Stöckhardt (4 January 1809 – 1 June 1886) was a German agricultural chemist. He is mostly recognized for his work on fertilizers, fume damage of plants and his book Die Schule der Chemie (School of Chemistry), which was translated into 14 languages. His 500 lectures and over 500 publications helped to establish agricultural chemistry in Germany.

== Life ==
Stöckhardt was born in Röhrsdorf near Meißen on 4 January 1809 as son of preacher Christian Gottlieb Stöckhardt. He studied Latin at school and then became an apprentice in a pharmacy in Liebenwerda from 1824 to 1828. He then studied at the University of Berlin, and worked at a pharmacy in Potsdam. He attended lectures of Eilhard Mitscherlisch, Heinrich Friedrich Link, Friedrich Hermbstädt and Henrik Steffens among others. He passed the Prussian examination for pharmacists and then travelled around Europe in 1834, meeting and interacting with Faraday, Gay Lussac and Jean-Baptiste Dumas. He then worked at Friedrich A. Struve's mineral water factory from 1835. Following this he taught natural sciences at Blochmann's school in Dresden and obtained a Ph.D. from the University of Leipzig in 1837 with a dissertation on the teaching of natural sciences. He received a position at the Königlichen Gewerbeschule in Chemnitz (Royal Saxon Industrial School) in 1838. In 1846 he became a member of Dresden's scientific society ISIS, led by Ludwig Reichenbach.

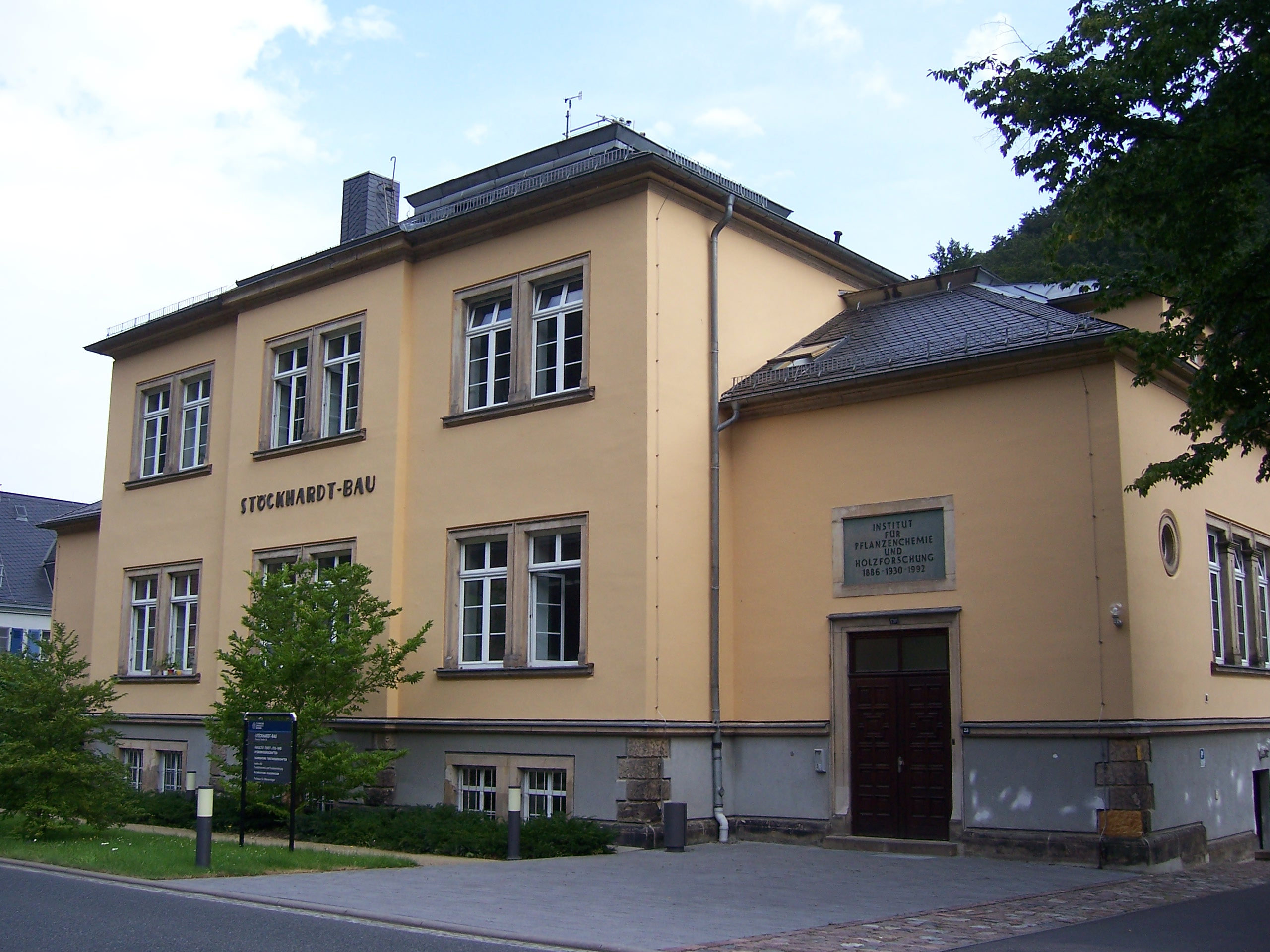
Building in Tharandt named after Stöckhardt

From 1847 to 1883, Stöckhardt worked at the Königliche Forstakademie (Royal Saxon Academy of Forestry) in Tharandt. He was the first German chair of agricultural chemistry and developed on the ideas of Justus von Liebig. In 1866, he was elected Fellow of the Leopoldina.

He died in Tharandt on 1 June 1886 three years after he retired from the Forstakademie.He married Rosalie Liebscher in 1840 and they had four children. She died in 1872. One of his sons, Carl Georg Stöckhardt, emigrated to the United States and taught exegesis at the Concordia Seminary of the Lutheran Church St. Louis.

== Work ==
After the book of Justus von Liebig, Organic Chemistry in its Application to Agriculture and Physiology was published in 1840, Stöckhardt recognized the importance of fertilization for farmers and invested most of his time in popularizing scientific knowledge. In 1843 he started to give chemical lectures for farmers. In 1850 he and Hugo Schober started to publish the Zeitschrift für deutsche Landwirthe (Journal for German farmers). One year later, Germany's first large agricultural experiment station opened in Leipzig-Möckern, initiated by Stöckhardt.

His research on fertilizers was influenced by the work of Liebig, but Stöckhardt included nitrogen compounds into his fertilizers. Liebig denied the need to include nitrogen because it was available as gas from air. This conflict escalated into an academic fight between him and the nitrogen advocates which also ended the friendship between Stöckhardt and Liebig. Eventually, nitrogen containing fertilizers became a great success.

His research in fume damage on plants especially by industrial exhaust was ground breaking. He fumigated plants with known amount of several chemical compounds, for example sulfur dioxide, to detect the minimal concentration at which damages occurs. A Commission for the detection of the damage caused by smelters was introduced and the state parliament of Saxony also dealt with damage caused by smelters after his results were published.

== Publications ==
- Julius Adolph Stöckhardt (1846–1920). Die Schule der Chemie (1-22 ed.). Friedrich Bieweg und Sohn.
- Julius Adolph Stöckhardt (1850). The Principles of Chemistry: Illustrated by Simple Experiments. Bartlett.
- Julius Adolph Stöckhardt (1853). Chemical field lectures for agriculturists. Bartlett.
- Josiah Parsons Cooke, Julius Adolph Stöckhardt (1857). Chemical Problems and Reactions: To Accompany Stöckhardt's Elements of Chemistry. Bartlett.
- Charles William Heaton, Julius Adolph Stöckhardt (1872). Experimental chemistry, founded on the work Principles of chemistry of J.A. Stöckhardt.
