= James Esdaile (mayor) =

British banker and politician

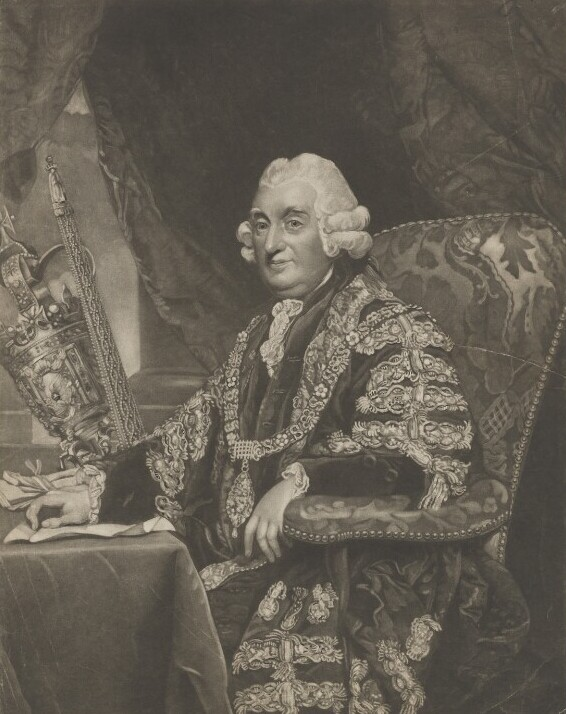
c. 1793 mezzotint of Esdaile

Sir James Esdaile (c. 1714 – c. 1793) was a British banker and politician who served as the Lord Mayor of London in 1777. His grandfather was a French nobleman and Huguenot from the De l'Estoile family who fled from the Kingdom of France in an attempt to avoid persecution by Louis XIV. Esdaile also served as sheriff of London in 1767. His daughter, Louisa married the politician Benjamin Hammet, who subsequently became a protege of Esdaile's. In 1781, he took Hammet into his banking firm, which became known as 'Esdaile, Hammet and Esdaile'. Esdaile died in 1793.

One of his sons, William Esdaile married the heiress of the Cothelstone estate in Somerset, which is still owned by his descendants, the Warmington family, in the 21st Century.
