= Donald Rutherford =

Donald Rutherford may refer to:

- Don Rutherford (1937–2016), English international rugby union player
- Donald L. Rutherford (born 1955), U.S. Army General and Roman Catholic priest, and former Chief Chaplain of the U.S. Army
- Donald Rutherford (economist) (born 1942), British economist
- Donald Rutherford (philosopher) (born 1957), American philosopher
