= Essay on the First Principles of Government =

1768 essay by Joseph Priestley

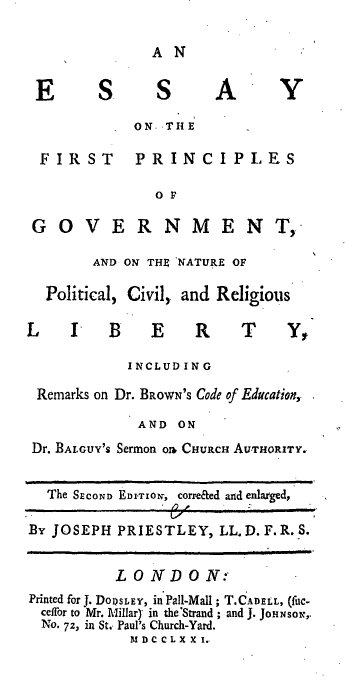
Title page to Joseph Priestley's Essay

Essay on the First Principles of Government (1768) is an early work of modern liberal political theory by 18th-century British polymath Joseph Priestley.

== Genesis of work ==
Priestley's friends urged him to publish a work on the injustices borne by religious Dissenters because of the Test and Corporation Acts, a topic to which he had already alluded in his Essay on a Course of Liberal Education for Civil and Active Life (1765).

Between 1660 and 1665, Parliament passed a series of laws that restricted the rights of Dissenters: they could not hold political office, teach school, serve in the military or attend Oxford and Cambridge unless they ascribed to the thirty-nine Articles of the Church of England. In 1689, a Toleration Act was passed that restored some of these rights, if Dissenters subscribed to 36 of the 39 articles (Catholics and Unitarians were excluded), but not all Dissenters were willing to accept this compromise and many refused to conform. Throughout the 18th century Dissenters were persecuted and the laws against them were erratically enforced. Dissenters continually petitioned Parliament to repeal the Test and Corporation Acts, claiming that the laws made them second-class citizens. The situation worsened in 1753 after the passage of Lord Hardwicke's Marriage Act which stipulated that all marriages must be performed by Anglican ministers; some refused to perform Dissenting weddings at all.

In order to defend Dissenters, the text rearticulates John Locke's arguments from the Two Treatises on Government (1689), but it also makes a useful distinction between political and civil rights and argues for protection of extensive civil rights. Priestley distinguishes between a private and a public sphere of governmental control; education and religion, in particular, he maintains, are matters of private conscience and should not be administered by the state. As Kramnick states, "Priestley's fundamental maxim of politics was the need to limit state interference on individual liberty." For early liberals like Priestley and Jefferson, the "defining feature of liberal politics" was its emphasis on the separation of church and state. In a statement that articulates key elements of early liberalism, Priestley wrote:

It must necessarily be understood, therefore, that all people live in society for their mutual advantage; so that the good and happiness of the members, that is the majority of the members of any state, is the great standard by which every thing relating to that state must finally be determined.

Priestley acknowledged that revolution was necessary at times but believed that Britain had already had its only necessary revolution in 1688, although his later writings would suggest otherwise. Priestley's later radicalism emerged from his belief that the British government was infringing upon individual freedom.

Essay on Government went through three English editions and was translated into Dutch.

== See also ==
- Contributions to liberal theory

== Bibliography ==
- Garrett, Clarke. "Joseph Priestley, the Millennium, and the French Revolution." Journal of the History of Ideas 34.1 (1973): 51–66.
- Jackson, Joe, A World on Fire: A Heretic, An Aristocrat And The Race to Discover Oxygen. New York: Viking, 2005. ISBN 0-670-03434-7.
- Kramnick, Isaac. "Eighteenth-Century Science and Radical Social Theory: The Case of Joseph Priestley's Scientific Liberalism." Journal of British Studies 25 (1986): 1–30.
- Schofield, Robert E. The Enlightenment of Joseph Priestley: A Study of his Life and Work from 1733 to 1773. University Park: Pennsylvania State University Press, 1997. ISBN 0-271-01662-0.
- Tapper, Alan. "Joseph Priestley." Dictionary of Literary Biography 252: British Philosophers 1500–1799. Eds. Philip B. Dematteis and Peter S. Fosl. Detroit: Gale Group, 2002.
- Uglow, Jenny. The Lunar Men: Five Friends Whose Curiosity Changed the World. New York: Farrar, Straus and Giroux, 2002. ISBN 0-374-19440-8.
