= The Doctrine of Philosophical Necessity Illustrated =

1777 book by Joseph Priestley

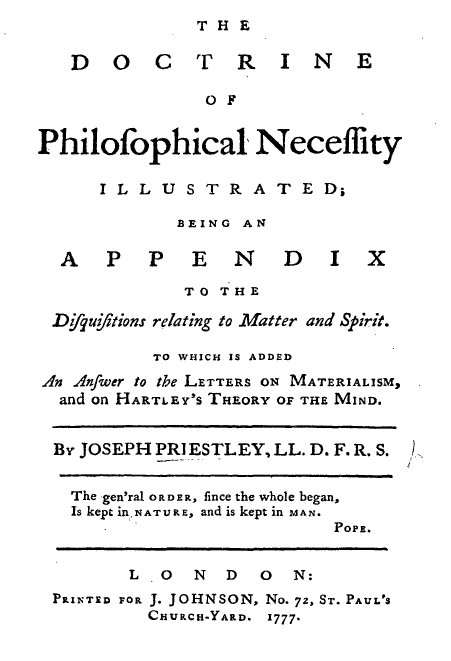
Title page from Joseph Priestley's Philosophical Necessity

The Doctrine of Philosophical Necessity (1777) is one of the major metaphysical works of 18th-century British polymath Joseph Priestley.

== Introduction ==
Between 1774 and 1778, while serving as an assistant to Lord Shelburne, Priestley wrote a series of five major metaphysical works, arguing for a materialist philosophy even though such a position "entailed denial of free will and the soul."

Continuing the arguments he had started in The Examination of Dr. Reid's Inquiry… Dr. Beattie's Essay… and Dr. Oswald's Appeal (1774) and Disquisitions Relating to Matter and Spirit (1777), Priestley published The Doctrine of Philosophical Necessity Illustrated (1777), an "appendix" to the Disquisitions that "suggests that materialism and determinism are mutually supporting." Priestley explicitly stated that humans had no free will: "all things, past, present, and to come, are precisely what the Author of nature really intended them to be, and has made provision for." He was the first to claim that what he called "philosophical necessity" (a position akin to absolute determinism) is consonant with Christianity. His philosophy was based on his theological interpretation of the natural world; like the rest of nature, man's mind is subject to the laws of causation, but because a benevolent God created these laws, Priestley argued, the world and the men in it will eventually be perfected. He argued that the associations made in a person's mind were a necessary product of their lived experience because Hartley's theory of associationism was analogous to natural laws, such as gravity. Priestley contends that his necessarianism can be distinguished from fatalism and predestination because it relies on natural law. Isaac Kramnick points out the paradox of Priestley's positions: as a reformer, he argued that political change was essential to human happiness and urged his readers to participate, but he also claimed in works such as Philosophical Necessity that humans have no free will.

== Reception ==
Philosophical Necessity influenced the 19th-century utilitarians John Stuart Mill and Herbert Spencer, who were drawn to its determinism.

The philosopher A. Spir believed that the work had so clearly refuted the notion of free will, that it is unnecessary to discuss the issue anymore. In a similar fashion, Arthur Schopenhauer commented that "no writer has presented the necessity of acts of will so thoroughly and convincingly as Priestley ... If anyone is not convinced by this supremely clearly and accessibly written book, his understanding must really be paralysed by prejudices," and that the work contributed to Kant taking the complete necessity of acts of will as a settled matter to which no further doubt could pertain.

The writer Herman Melville mentions this book in the short story "Bartleby, the Scrivener". The narrator reads this philosophical treatise to get ideas on how to treat his obstinate employee Bartleby and to examine their relation to one another in God's larger plan.

== See also ==
- Libertarianism (metaphysics)

== Bibliography ==
- Garrett, Clarke. "Joseph Priestley, the Millennium, and the French Revolution." Journal of the History of Ideas 34.1 (1973): 51–66.
- Kramnick, Isaac. "Eighteenth-Century Science and Radical Social Theory: The Case of Joseph Priestley's Scientific Liberalism." Journal of British Studies 25 (1986): 1–30.
- Schofield, Robert E. The Enlightened Joseph Priestley: A Study of His Life and Work from 1773 to 1804. University Park: Pennsylvania State University Press, 2004. ISBN 0-271-02459-3.
- Sheps, Arthur. "Joseph Priestley's Time Charts: The Use and Teaching of History by Rational Dissent in late Eighteenth-Century England." Lumen 18 (1999): 135–154.
- Tapper, Alan. "Joseph Priestley." Dictionary of Literary Biography 252: British Philosophers 1500–1799. Eds. Philip B. Dematteis and Peter S. Fosl. Detroit: Gale Group, 2002.
