= The Rudiments of English Grammar =

English grammar textbook written by Joseph Priestley

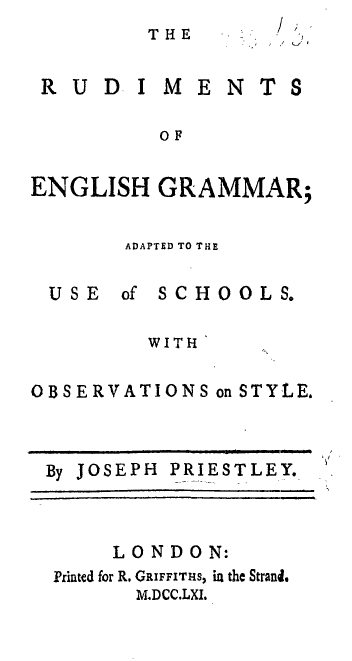
Title page from the first edition of Joseph Priestley's Rudiments of English Grammar (1761)

The Rudiments of English Grammar (1761) was a popular English grammar textbook written by the 18th-century British polymath Joseph Priestley.

== Composition history ==
While a minister for a congregation in Nantwich, Cheshire, Priestley established a local school; it was his first successful educational venture. Believing that all students should have a good grasp of English and its grammar before learning any other language, and dismayed at the quality of the instruction manuals available, Priestley wrote his own textbook: The Rudiments of English Grammar (1761).

== Contents and sources ==
The book was very successful—it was reprinted for over fifty years. Its humor may have contributed to its popularity; for example, Priestley illustrated the couplet with this rhyme:

Beneath this stone my wife doth lie:
She's now at rest, and so am I.

Priestley also quoted from the most famous English authors, encouraging the middle-class association between reading and pleasure, a reading that would also, Priestley hoped, foster morality. Priestley's innovations in the teaching and description of English grammar, particularly his efforts to dissociate it from Latin grammar, made his textbook revolutionary and have led 20th-century scholars to describe him as "one of the great grammarians of his time."

== Impact ==
Rudiments influenced all of the major British grammarians of the late 18th century: Robert Lowth, James Harris, John Horne Tooke and even the American Noah Webster. The resounding success of Priestley's book was one of the reasons that Warrington Academy offered him a teaching position in 1761.

== Bibliography ==
- Gibbs, F. W. Joseph Priestley: Adventurer in Science and Champion of Truth. London: Thomas Nelson and Sons, 1965.
- Jackson, Joe, A World on Fire: A Heretic, An Aristocrat And The Race to Discover Oxygen. New York: Viking, 2005. ISBN 0-670-03434-7.
- Schofield, Robert E. The Enlightenment of Joseph Priestley: A Study of his Life and Work from 1733 to 1773. University Park: Pennsylvania State University Press, 1997. ISBN 0-271-01662-0.
- Watts, R. "Joseph Priestley and education." Enlightenment and Dissent 2 (1983): 83–100.
