= Donald Rutherford (economist) =

British economist

- Born: 5 September 1942; Newcastle-upon-Tyne, England
- Died: 4 September 2023 (aged 80); Edinburgh, Scotland
- Resting place: Church of St Michael and All Saints, Edinburgh
- Education: Queen's College, Oxford (PhD)
- Known for: works on history of economic thought
- Parents: George Rutherford (father); Lilian Rutherford (mother)
- Relatives: Malcolm and David (brothers)
- Scientific career
- Fields: economics
- Institutions: University of Edinburgh

Donald Rutherford (1942–2023) was a British economist and Lecturer in Economics at the University of Edinburgh.

== Biography ==
He was educated at The Queen's College, Oxford. Donald Rutherford was Lecturer (1969–2009) and subsequently honorary lecturer at the University of Edinburgh. Rutherford is known for his writings on the history of economic thought and Scottish economics.

== Books ==
- Suspicions of Markets: Critical Attacks from Aristotle to the Twenty-First Century. Palgrave Macmillan. 2016. doi:10.1007/978-3-319-40808-8.
- Maynard's World (2014)
- Routledge Dictionary of Economics (1st ed.). London and New York: Routledge. 1992 – via Internet Archive., 2nd edition (2002); 3rd edition (2013). Routledge
- In the Shadow of Adam Smith: Founders of Scottish Economics 1700-1900. Palgrave Macmillan. 2012 – via Internet Archive.
- Economics: The Key Concepts. Routledge. 2007.
- "Malthus and Three Approaches to Solving the Population Problem". Population (English Edition, 2002-). 62 (2): 213–237. 2007. JSTOR 27645305.
- "Les trois approches de Malthus pour résoudre le problème démographique". Population (French Edition, 2002-). 62 (2): 253–280. 2007. JSTOR 20451011.
- Donald Rutherford, ed. (2005). Biographical Dictionary of British Economists. Bristol: Thoemmes Continuum. ISBN 1-84371-030-7. 2 volumes
- Collected Works of Nassau William Senior (ed.) (1998)
