= Leibniz and the Rational Order of Nature =

1995 book by Donald Rutherford

- Author: Donald Rutherford
- Language: English
- Subject: Leibniz's philosophy
- Publisher: Cambridge University Press
- Publication date: 1995, paperback 1998
- Media type: Print
- Pages: 301 pp.
- ISBN: 9781139172776

Leibniz and the Rational Order of Nature is a 1995 book about the concept of order in Leibniz's thought by Donald Rutherford.

== Reception ==
John Whipple from University of Illinois at Chicago calls the book "one of the most important books about Leibniz" and believes that "No one has done more to explain the importance of the notion of order in Leibniz's philosophy than Donald Rutherford".

== See also ==
- Natural order (philosophy)
