= Essay on a Course of Liberal Education for Civil and Active Life =

Educational treatise by Joseph Priestley

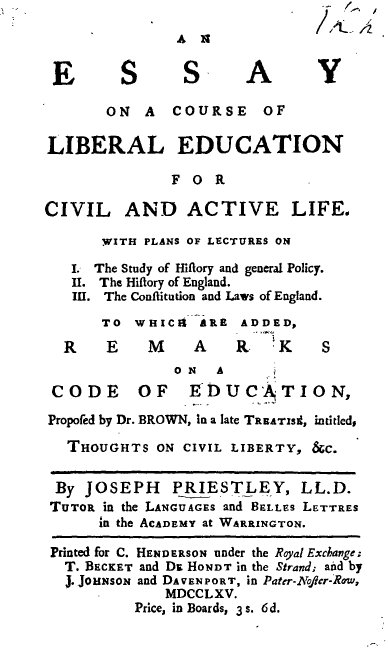
Title page from Joseph Priestley's Essay on Education

Essay on a Course of Liberal Education for Civil and Active Life (1765) is an educational treatise by the 18th-century British polymath Joseph Priestley.

== Contents ==
Dedicated to the governing board of Warrington Academy at which Priestley was a tutor, the treatise argues that the education of young people should anticipate their practical needs, something Priestley accused the current universities, Dissenting and Establishment alike, of failing to do. In Priestley's eyes, the contemporary focus on a traditional classical education prevented students from acquiring useful skills. This principle of utility guided his unconventional curricular choices for Warrington's aspiring middle-class businessmen. He proposed that students should study the English language and the modern languages instead of the classical languages, learn practical mathematics, read modern history rather than ancient history, and study the constitution and laws of England. He believed that these topics would prepare his students for the commercial middle-class life that most of them would live; he did not believe that the poor people should receive this same education, arguing "it could be of no service to their country, and often a real detriment to themselves."

== Impact ==
The board was convinced and in 1766 Warrington Academy replaced its classical curriculum with Priestley's liberal arts model.

Some scholars of education have argued that this work and Priestley's later Miscellaneous Observations relating to Education (1778) (often reprinted with the Essay on Education) made Priestley the "most considerable English writer on educational philosophy" between the 17th-century John Locke and the 19th-century Herbert Spencer.

== Bibliography ==
- Schofield, Robert E. The Enlightenment of Joseph Priestley: A Study of his Life and Work from 1733 to 1773. University Park: Pennsylvania State University Press, 1997. ISBN 0-271-01662-0.
- Sheps, Arthur. "Joseph Priestley's Time Charts: The Use and Teaching of History by Rational Dissent in late Eighteenth-Century England." Lumen 18 (1999): 135–154.
- Thorpe, T.E. Joseph Priestley. London: J. M. Dent, 1906.
- Watts, R. "Joseph Priestley and education." Enlightenment and Dissent 2 (1983): 83–100.
