= Donald Rutherford (philosopher) =

Canadian philosopher and professor

Donald Paul Rutherford
- Born: 1957 (age 68–69)

Education
- Education: University of California, Berkeley (PhD)
- Thesis: Leibniz on the Reality of Body (1988)
- Doctoral advisor: Janet Broughton

Philosophical work
- Era: 21st-century philosophy
- Region: Western philosophy
- School: Early modern philosophy
- Institutions: University of California, San Diego
- Main interests: history of ethics

Donald Paul Rutherford (born 1957) is a Canadian philosopher and an emeritus professor of philosophy at the University of California, San Diego. He is known for his research on early modern philosophy. Rutherford is a former president of Leibniz Society of North America (2010–14) and a winner of its Essay Prize (1992). He is an editor (with Daniel Garber) of Oxford Studies in Early Modern Philosophy.

== Books ==
- Leibniz and the Rational Order of Nature, Cambridge University Press, 1995
- The Leibniz-Des Bosses Correspondence, Latin edition, English translation with Introduction and Notes (with Brandon Look), Yale University Press, 2007
- Leibniz: Nature and Freedom, edited with Introduction (co-editor J.A. Cover), Oxford University Press, 2005
- The Cambridge Companion to Early Modern Philosophy, edited with Introduction, Cambridge University Press, 2006
- Oxford Studies in Early Modern Philosophy, co-editor (with Daniel Garber): vol. 6 (2012), vol. 7 (2015), vol. 8 (2018); editor: vol. 9 (2019)
