= Joseph Priestley and Dissent =

Aspect of Joseph Priestley's thought

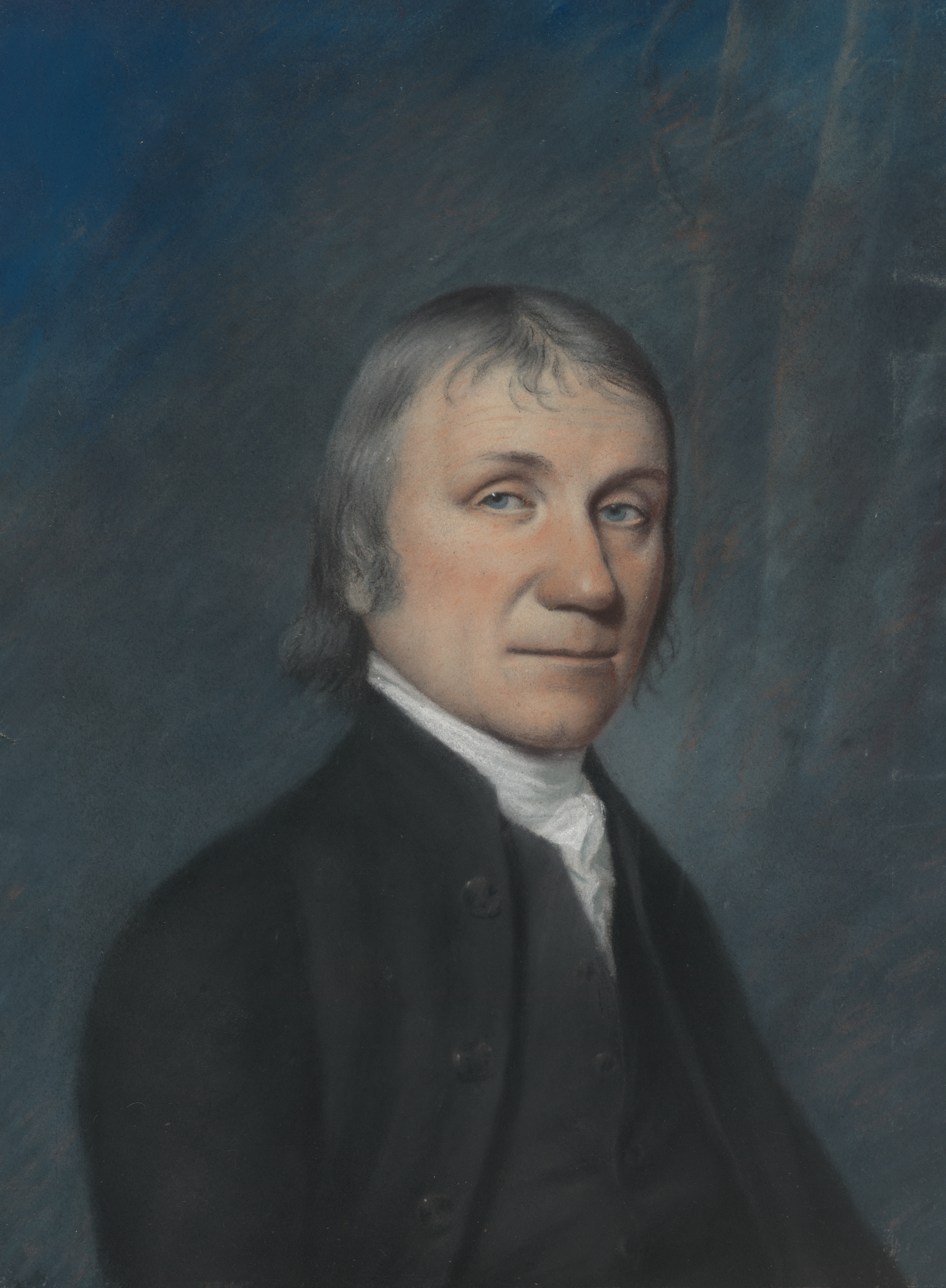
Priestley by James Sharples, c. 1797

Joseph Priestley (13 March 1733 (old style) – 8 February 1804) was a British natural philosopher, political theorist, clergyman, theologian, and educator. He was one of the most influential Dissenters of the late 18th-century.

A member of marginalized religious groups throughout his life and a proponent of what was called "rational Dissent", Priestley advocated religious toleration (challenging even William Blackstone), helped Theophilus Lindsey found the Unitarian church and promoted the repeal of the Test and Corporation Acts in the 1780s. As the foremost British expounder of providentialism, he argued for extensive civil rights, believing that individuals could bring about progress and eventually the Millennium. Priestley's religious beliefs were integral to his metaphysics as well as his politics and he was the first philosopher to "attempt to combine theism, materialism, and determinism," a project that has been called "audacious and original."

== Defender of Dissenters and political philosopher ==
Priestley claimed throughout his life that politics did not interest him and that he did not participate in it. What appeared to others as political arguments were for Priestley always, at their root, religious arguments. Many of what we would call Priestley's political writings were aimed at supporting the repeal of the Test and Corporation Acts, a political issue that had its foundation in religion.

Between 1660 and 1665, Parliament passed a series of laws that restricted the rights of dissenters: they could not hold political office, teach school, serve in the military or attend Oxford and Cambridge unless they ascribed to the thirty-nine Articles of the Church of England. In 1689, a Toleration Act was passed that restored some of these rights, if dissenters subscribed to 36 of the 39 articles (Catholics and Unitarians were excluded), but not all Dissenters were willing to accept this compromise and many refused to conform. Throughout the 18th century Dissenters were persecuted and the laws against them were erratically enforced. Dissenters continually petitioned Parliament to repeal the Test and Corporation Acts, claiming that the laws made them second-class citizens. The situation worsened in 1753 after the passage of Lord Hardwicke's Marriage Act which stipulated that all marriages must be performed by Anglican ministers; some refused to perform Dissenting weddings at all.

Priestley's friends urged him to publish a work on the injustices borne by Dissenters, a topic to which he had already alluded in his Essay on a Course of Liberal Education for Civil and Active Life (1765). The result was Priestley's Essay on the First Principles of Government, which Priestley's major modern biographer calls his "most systematic political work," in 1768. The book went through three English editions and was translated into Dutch. Jeremy Bentham credited it with inspiring his "greatest happiness principle." The Essay on Government is not strictly utilitarian, however; like all of Priestley's works, it is infused with the belief that society is progressing towards perfection. Although much of the text rearticulates John Locke's arguments from his Two Treatises on Government (1689), it also makes a useful distinction between political and civil rights and argues for protection of extensive civil rights. He distinguishes between a private and a public sphere of governmental control; education and religion, in particular, he maintains, are matters of private conscience and should not be administered by the state. As Kramnick states, "Priestley's fundamental maxim of politics was the need to limit state interference on individual liberty." For early liberals like Priestley and Jefferson, the "defining feature of liberal politics" was its emphasis on the separation of church and state. In a statement that articulates key elements of early liberalism and anticipates utilitarian arguments, Priestley wrote:

It must necessarily be understood, therefore, that all people live in society for their mutual advantage; so that the good and happiness of the members, that is the majority of the members of any state, is the great standard by which every thing relating to that state must finally be determined.

Priestley acknowledged that revolution was necessary at times but believed that Britain had already had its only necessary revolution in 1688, although his later writings would suggest otherwise. Priestley's later radicalism emerged from his belief that the British government was infringing upon individual freedom. Priestley would repeatedly return to these themes throughout his career, particularly when defending the rights of Dissenters.

=== Critic of William Blackstone's Commentaries ===
In another attempt to champion the rights of Dissenters, Priestley defended their constitutional rights against the attacks of William Blackstone, an eminent legal theorist. Blackstone's Commentaries, fast becoming the standard reference for legal interpretation, stated that dissent from the Church of England was a crime and argued that Dissenters could not be loyal subjects. Furious, Priestley lashed out with his Remarks on Dr. Blackstone's Commentaries (1769), correcting Blackstone's grammar, his history and his interpretation of the law. Blackstone, chastened, replied in a pamphlet and altered his Commentaries in subsequent editions; he rephrased the offending passages but still described Dissent as a crime.

=== Founder of Unitarianism ===
When Parliament rejected the Feather's Tavern petition in 1772, which would have released Dissenters from subscribing to the thirty-nine articles, many Dissenting ministers, as William Paley wrote, "could not afford to keep a conscience." Priestley's friend from Leeds, Theophilus Lindsey, decided to try. He gave up his church, sold his books so that he would have money to live on and established the first Unitarian chapel in London. The radical publisher Joseph Johnson helped him find a building, which became known as Essex Street Chapel. Priestley's patron at the time, Lord Shelburne, promised that he would keep the church out of legal difficulties (barrister John Lee, later Attorney-General, also helped), and Priestley and many others hurried to raise money for Lindsey.

On 17 April 1774, the chapel had its first service. Lindsey had designed his own liturgy, of which many were critical. Priestley rushed to his defense with Letter to a Layman, on the Subject of the Rev. Mr. Lindsey's Proposal for a Reformed English Church (1774), claiming that only the form of worship had been altered and attacking those who only followed religion as a fashion. Priestley attended the church regularly while living in Calne with Shelburne and even occasionally preached there. He continued to support institutionalized Unitarianism after he moved to Birmingham in 1780, encouraging the foundation of new Unitarian chapels throughout Britain and the United States. He wrote numerous letters in defence of Unitarianism, in particular against certain ministers and scholars such as Samuel Horsley, Alexander Geddes, George Horne and Thomas Howes. These letters were compiled and published (by the author) in an "annual reply" covering the years 1786-1789. He also compiled and edited a liturgy and hymnbook for the new denomination.

=== Religious activist ===
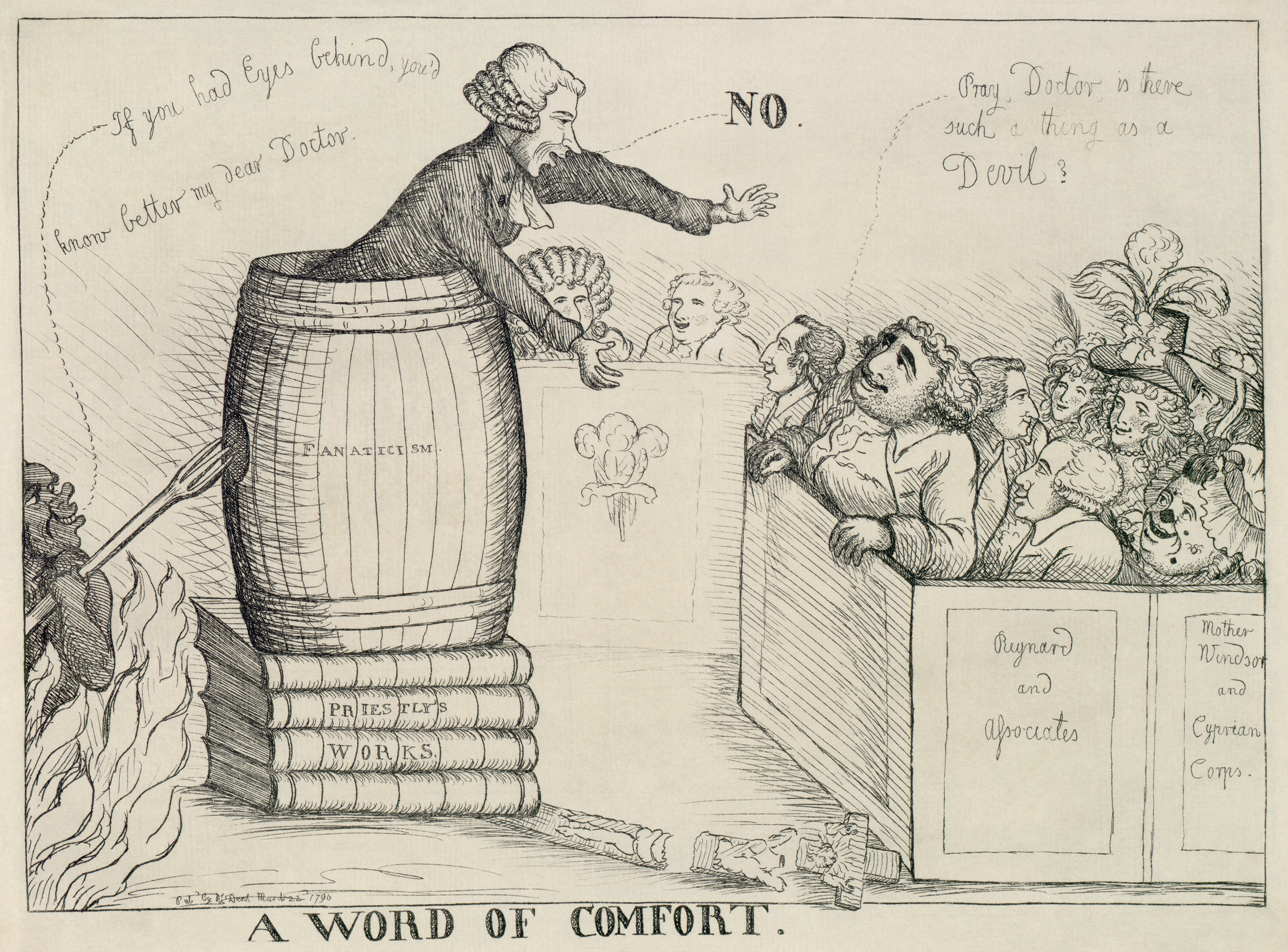
"A Word of Comfort" by William Dent (1790). Priestley, preaching in front of Charles James Fox who asks "Pray, Doctor is there such a thing as a Devil?", to which Priestley responds "No" while the devil prepares to attack Priestly from behind.

In 1787, 1789 and 1790, Dissenters again tried to repeal the Test and Corporation Acts. Although initially it looked as if they might succeed, by 1790, with the fears of the French Revolution looming in the minds of many members of Parliament, few were swayed by Charles James Fox's arguments for equal rights. Political cartoons, one of the most effective and popular media of the time, skewered the Dissenters and Priestley specifically. In the midst of these trying times, it was the betrayal of William Pitt and Edmund Burke that most angered Priestley and his friends; they had expected the two men's support and instead both argued vociferously against the repeal. Priestley wrote a series of Letters to William Pitt and Letters to Burke in an attempt to persuade them otherwise, but to no avail. These publications unfortunately also inflamed the populace against him.

In its propaganda against the "radicals," Pitt's administration argued that Priestley and other Dissenters wanted to overthrow the government. Dissenters who had supported the French revolution came under increasing suspicion as skepticism over the revolution's benefits and ideals grew. When in 1790 Richard Price, the other leading Dissenting minister in Britain at the time, gave a rousing sermon supporting the French revolutionaries and comparing them to English revolutionaries of 1688, Burke responded with his famous Reflections on the Revolution in France. Priestley rushed to the defense of his friend and of the revolutionaries, publishing one of the many responses, along with Thomas Paine and Mary Wollstonecraft, that became part of the "Revolution Controversy." Paradoxically, it is Burke, the secular statesman, who argued against science and maintained that religion should be the basis of civil society while Priestley, the Dissenting minister, argued that religion could not provide the basis for society and should be restricted to one's private life.

== Political adviser to Lord Shelburne ==
Priestley also served as a kind of political adviser to Lord Shelburne while he working for him as a tutor and librarian; he gathered information for him on parliamentary issues and served as a conduit of information for Dissenting and American interests. Priestley published several political works during these years, most of which were focused on the rights of dissenters, such as An Address to Protestant Dissenters . . . on the Approaching Election of Members of Parliament (1774). This pamphlet was published anonymously and Schofield calls it "the most outspoken of anything he ever wrote." Priestley called on Dissenters to vote against those in Parliament who had, by refusing to repeal the Test and Corporation Acts, denied them their rights. He wrote a second part dedicated to defending the rebelling American colonists at the behest of Benjamin Franklin and John Fothergill. The pamphlets created a stir throughout Britain but the results of the election did not favor Shelburne's party.

== Materialist philosopher and theologian ==
In a series of five major metaphysical works, all written between 1774 and 1778, Priestley laid out his materialist view of the world and tried "to defend Christianity by making its metaphysical framework more intelligible," even though such a position "entailed denial of free will and the soul." The first major work to address these issues was The Examination of Dr. Reid's Inquiry ... Dr. Beattie's Essay ... and Dr. Oswald's Appeal (1774). He challenged Scottish common-sense philosophy, which claimed that "common sense" trumped reason in matters of religion. Relying on Locke and Hartley's associationism, he argued strenuously against Reid's theory of mind and maintained that ideas did not have to resemble their referents in the world; ideas for Priestley were not pictures in the mind but rather causal associations. From these arguments, Priestley concluded that "ideas and objects must be of the same substance," a radically materialist view at the time. The book was popular and readers of all persuasions read it. Charles Lamb wrote to Samuel Taylor Coleridge, recommending "that clear, strong, humorous, most entertaining piece of reasoning" and Priestley heard rumors that even Hume had read the work and "declared that the manner of the work was proper, as the argument was unanswerable."

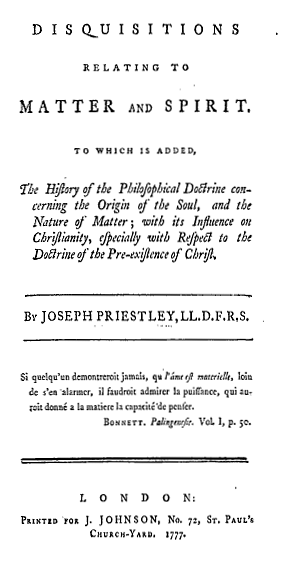
Title page from the first edition of Disquisitions relating to Matter and Spirit (1777)

When arguing for materialism in his Examination Priestley strongly suggested that there was no mind-body duality. Such opinions shocked and angered many of his readers and reviewers who believed that for the soul to exist, there had to be a mind-body duality. In order to clarify his position he wrote Disquisitions relating to Matter and Spirit (1777), which claimed that both "matter" and "force" are active, and therefore that objects in the world and the mind must be made of the same substance. Priestley also argued that discussing the soul was impossible because it is made of a divine substance and humanity cannot gain access to the divine. He therefore denied the materialism of the soul while simultaneously claiming its existence. Although he buttressed his arguments with familiar scholarship and ancient authorities, including scripture, he was labeled an atheist. At least a dozen hostile refutations of the work were published by 1782.

Priestley continued this series of arguments in The Doctrine of Philosophical Necessity Illustrated (1777); the text was designed as an "appendix" to the Disquisitions and "suggests that materialism and determinism are mutually supporting." Priestley explicitly stated that humans had no free will: "all things, past, present, and to come, are precisely what the Author of nature really intended them to be, and has made provision for." His notion of "philosophical necessity," which he was the first to claim was consonant with Christianity, at times resembles absolute determinism; it is based on his understanding of the natural world and theology: like the rest of nature, man's mind is subject to the laws of causation, but because a benevolent God has created these laws, Priestley argued, the world as a whole will eventually be perfected. He argued that the associations made in a person's mind were a necessary product of their lived experience because Hartley's theory of associationism was analogous to natural laws such as gravity. Priestley contends that his necessarianism can be distinguished from fatalism and predestination because it relies on natural law. Isaac Kramnick points out the paradox of Priestley's positions: as a reformer, he argued that political change was essential to human happiness and urged his readers to participate, but he also claimed in works such as Philosophical Necessity that humans have no free will. Philosophical Necessity influenced the 19th-century utilitarians John Stuart Mill and Herbert Spencer, who were drawn to its determinism. Immanuel Kant, entranced by Priestley's determinism but repelled by his reliance on observed reality, created a transcendental version of determinism that he claimed allowed liberty to the mind and soul.

In the last of his important books on metaphysics, Letters to a Philosophical Unbeliever (1780), Priestley continues to defend his thesis that materialism and determinism can be reconciled with a belief in a God. The seed for this book had been sown during his trip to Paris with Shelburne. Priestley recalled in his Memoirs:

As I chose on all occasions to appear as a Christian, I was told by some of them [philosophes], that I was the only person they had ever met with, of whose understanding they had any opinion, who professed to believe Christianity. But on interrogating them on the subject, I soon found that they had given no proper attention to it, and did not really know what Christianity was ... Having conversed so much with unbelievers at home and abroad, I thought I should be able to combat their prejudices with some advantage, and with this view I wrote ... the first part of my 'Letters to a Philosophical Unbeliever', in proof of the doctrines of a God and a providence, and ... a second part, in defence of the evidences [sic] of Christianity.

The text addresses those whose faith is shaped by books and fashion; Priestley draws an analogy between the skepticism of educated men and the credulity of the masses. He again argues for the existence of God using what Schofield calls "the classic argument from design ... leading from the necessary existence of a creator-designer to his self-comprehension, eternal existence, infinite power, omnipresence, and boundless benevolence." In the three volumes, Priestley discusses, among many other works, Baron d'Holbach's Systeme de la Nature, often called the "bible of atheism." He claimed that d'Holbach's "energy of nature," though it lacked intelligence or purpose, was really a description of God. Priestley believed that David Hume's style in the Dialogues Concerning Natural Religion (1779) was just as dangerous as its ideas; he feared the open-endedness of the Humean dialogue.

== Bibliography ==
For a complete bibliography of Priestley's writings, see list of works by Joseph Priestley.

- Fitzpatrick Martin. "Heretical Religion and Radical Political Ideas in Late Eighteenth-Century England." The Transformation of Political Culture: England and Germany in the Late Eighteenth Century. Ed. Eckhart Hellmuth. Oxford: ?, 1990.
- Fitzpatrick, Martin. "Joseph Priestley and the Cause of Universal Toleration." The Price-Priestley Newsletter 1 (1977): 3–30.
- Garrett, Clarke. "Joseph Priestley, the Millennium, and the French Revolution." Journal of the History of Ideas 34.1 (1973): 51–66.
- Gibbs, F. W. Joseph Priestley: Adventurer in Science and Champion of Truth. London: Thomas Nelson and Sons, 1965.
- Haakonssen, Knud, ed. Enlightenment and Religion: Rational Dissent in Eighteenth-Century Britain. Cambridge: Cambridge University Press, 1996. ISBN 0-521-56060-8.
- Jackson, Joe, A World on Fire: A Heretic, An Aristocrat and the Race to Discover Oxygen. New York: Viking, 2005. ISBN 0-670-03434-7.
- Kramnick, Isaac. "Eighteenth-Century Science and Radical Social Theory: The Case of Joseph Priestley's Scientific Liberalism." Journal of British Studies 25 (1986): 1–30.
- McEvoy, John G. "Enlightenment and dissent in science: Joseph Priestley and the limits of theoretical reasoning." Enlightenment and Dissent 2 (1983): 47–68; 57–8.
- McLachlan, John. Joseph Priestley Man of Science 1733–1804: An Iconography of a Great Yorkshireman. Braunton and Devon: Merlin Books Ltd., 1983. ISBN 0-86303-052-1.
- Philip, Mark. "Rational Religion and Political Radicalism." Enlightenment and Dissent 4 (1985): 35–46.
- Schofield, Robert E. The Enlightenment of Joseph Priestley: A Study of his Life and Work from 1733 to 1773. University Park: Pennsylvania State University Press, 1997. ISBN 0-271-01662-0.
- Schofield, Robert E. The Enlightened Joseph Priestley: A Study of His Life and Work from 1773 to 1804. University Park: Pennsylvania State University Press, 2004. ISBN 0-271-02459-3.
- Sheps, Arthur. "Joseph Priestley's Time Charts: The Use and Teaching of History by Rational Dissent in late Eighteenth-Century England." Lumen 18 (1999): 135–154.
- Tapper, Alan. "Joseph Priestley." Dictionary of Literary Biography 252: British Philosophers 1500–1799. Eds. Philip B. Dematteis and Peter S. Fosl. Detroit: Gale Group, 2002.
- Thorpe, T.E. Joseph Priestley. London: J. M. Dent, 1906.
- Uglow, Jenny. The Lunar Men: Five Friends Whose Curiosity Changed the World. New York: Farrar, Straus and Giroux, 2002. ISBN 0-374-19440-8.
