= List of works by Joseph Priestley =

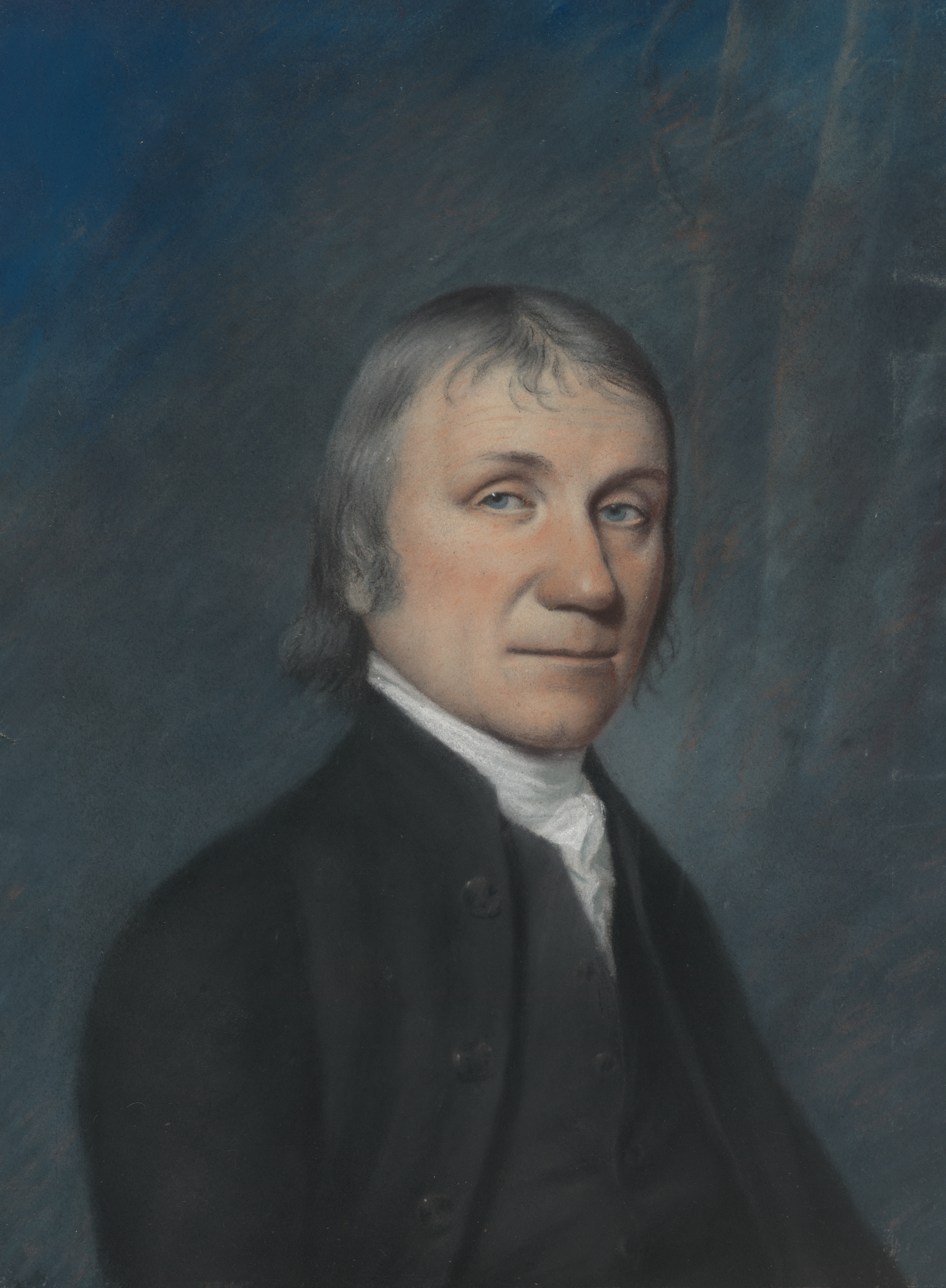
Priestley, painted by James Sharples, c. 1797

Joseph Priestley (1733–1804) was a British natural philosopher, Dissenting clergyman, political theorist, theologian, and educator. He is best known for his discovery, simultaneously with Antoine Lavoisier, of oxygen gas.

A member of marginalized religious groups throughout his life and a proponent of what was called "rational Dissent," Priestley advocated religious toleration and equal rights for Dissenters. He argued for extensive civil rights in works such as the important Essay on the First Principles of Government, believing that individuals could bring about progress and eventually the Millennium; he was the foremost British expounder of providentialism. Priestley also made significant contributions to education, publishing, among other things, The Rudiments of English Grammar, a seminal work on English grammar. In his most lasting contributions to education, he argued for the benefits of a liberal arts education and of the value of the study of modern history. In his metaphysical works, Priestley "attempt[ed] to combine theism, materialism, and determinism," a project that has been called "audacious and original."

Throughout his life, Priestley was known not only as a political and theological controversialist but also as a natural philosopher. His scientific reputation rested on his writings on electricity, his invention of soda water, and his discovery of 10 previously unknown "Airs" (gases), that he reported about from 1774 to 1786 in a giant book of 6 volumes: Experiments and Observations on Different Kinds of Air. The most important of these newly discovered airs, was named by Priestley as "dephlogisticated air" (oxygen). But Priestley's determination to reject Lavoisier's "new chemistry" and to cling to phlogiston theory left him isolated within the scientific community.

This list classifies all of the works by Priestley. It is taken from Ronald E. Crook's A Bibliography of Joseph Priestley 1733-1804 (unless otherwise noted) and it follows very closely his generic subdivisions. All texts are by Priestley unless otherwise noted and only the first English language editions of the texts are listed below. The dash at the beginning of each entry below is a shorthand for the author's name, Joseph Priestley, consistent with standard bibliographic custom.

== Theological and religious works ==
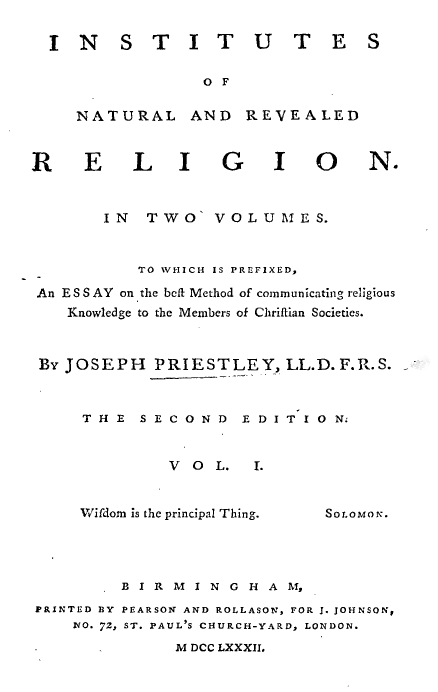
Title page from the first volume of Priestley's Institutes of Natural and Revealed Religion (2nd ed.)

- —. The Scripture Doctrine of Remission. London: Printed for C. Henderson; R. Griffiths; and P. A. De Hondt, 1761.
- —. No Man Liveth to Himself, a Sermon preached before the Assembly of Protestant Dissenting-Ministers, of the counties of Lancaster and Chester, met at Manchester May 16, 1764... Warrington: n.p., 1764.
- —. A Catechism for Children and Young Persons. London: n.p., 1767.
- —. A Free Address to Protestant Dissenters on the Subject of the Lord's Supper. London: Printed for J. Johnson, 1768.
- —. Considerations on Differences of Opinion among Christians. London: Printed for J. Johnson and J. Payne, 1769.
- —. A Serious Address to Masters of Families, with Forms of Family-Prayer. London: Printed for J. Johnson and J. Payne, 1769.
- —. Additions to the Address to Protestant Dissenters, on the Subject of the Lord's Supper. London: Printed for Joseph Johnson, 1770.
- —. A Familiar Illustration of Certain Passages of Scripture relating to the power of man to do the Will of God, Original Sin, Election and Reprobation, the Divinity of Christ and Atonement for Sin by the Death of Christ. Leeds, n.p., 1770.
- —. Letters to the Author of Remarks on Several Late Publications Relative to the Dissenters. London: Printed for J. Johnson, 1770.
- —. A Free Address to Protestant Dissenters, on the Subject of Church Discipline. London: Printed for J. Johnson, 1770.
- —. An Appeal to the Serious and Candid Professors of Christianity. Leeds: n.p., 1771.
- —. Letters and Queries Addressed to the Anonymous Answerer of an Appeal to the Serious and Candid Professors of Christianity. Leeds: Sold by J. Binns, 1771.
- —. A Scripture Catechism, consisting of a Series of Questions, with References to the Scriptures. n.l: n.p., 1772.
- —. Institutes of Natural and Revealed Religion. Vol. 1. London: Printed for J. Johnson, 1772.
- —. Institutes of Natural and Revealed Religion. Vol. 2. London: Printed for J. Johnson, 1773.
- —. An Address to Protestant Dissenters on Giving the Lord's Supper to Children. London: Printed for J. Johnson, 1773.
- —. A Sermon Preached before the Congregation of Protestant Dissenters at Mill-Hill Chapel in Leeds, May 16, 1773 . . . On Occasion of his resigning his Pastoral Office among them. London: Printed for J. Johnson, 1773.
- —. Institutes of Natural and Revealed Religion. Vol. 3. London: Printed for J. Johnson, 1774.
- —. A Letter to a Layman, on the Subject of the Rev. Mr. Lindsey's Proposal for a Reformed English Church. London: Printed for J. Wilkie, 1774.
- —. Harmony of the Evangelists, in Greek. London: Printed for J. Johnson, 1777.
- —. The Doctrine of Divine Influence on the Human Mind, considered, in a Sermon [on Matt. 18:3-20]. Bath: Printed by R. Cruttwell; sold by J. Johnson, London, 1779.
- —. A Harmony of the Evangelists in English. London: Printed for J. Johnson, 1780.
- —. Two Letters to Dr. Newcome, Bishop of Waterford. On the Duration of our Saviour's Ministry. Birmingham: Printed by Pearson and Rollason, for J. Johnson, London, 1780.
- —. A Third Letter to Dr. Newcome, Bishop of Waterford, on the Duration of our Saviour's Ministry. Birmingham: Printed by Piercy and Jones, for J. Johnson, London, 1781.
- —. A Sermon [on John 17:19] preached December the 31st, 1780, at the New Meeting in Birmingham, on undertaking the Pastoral Office in that Place. Birmingham: Printed by Pearson and Rollason, for J. Johnson, London, 1781.
- —. The Proper Constitution of a Christian church, considered in A Sermon [on Revelation 3:2], preached at the New Meeting in Birmingham, November 3, 1782. Birmingham: Printed by Pearson and Rollason, 1782.
- —. Two Discourses; I. On Habitual Devotion, II. On the Duty of not living to Ourselves; Both Preached to Assemblies of Protestant Dissenting Ministers, and published at their Request. Birmingham: Printed by Piercy and Jones, for J. Johnson, London, 1782.
- —. An History of the Corruptions of Christianity. Birmingham: Printed by Piercy and Jones, for J. Johnson, 1782.
- —. Philosophical Solitude: or the Choice of a Rural Life, A Poem. Printed by Isaac Collins, 1782. Trenton.[note: not first edition].
- —. Forms of Prayer and other Offices for the Use of Unitarian Societies. Birmingham: Printed by Pearson and Rollason, for J. Johnson, London, 1783.
- —. A Reply to the Animadversions on the History of the Corruptions of Christianity. n.l.:, n.p., 1783.
- —. A General View of the Arguments for the Unity of God; and against the Divinity and Pre-existence of Christ, from Reason, from the Scriptures, and from History. Birmingham: Printed by Piercy and Jones, for J. Johnson, London, 1783.
- —. Letters to Dr. Horsley, in Answer to his Animadversions on the History of the Corruptions of Christianity. Birmingham: Printed by Pearson and Rollason, for J. Johnson, London, 1783.
- —. Defences of the History of the Corruptions of Christianity. London: Printed for J. Johnson, 1783–6.
- —. Letters to Dr. Horsley, Part II. Birmingham: Printed by Pearson and Rollason, for J. Johnson, London, 1784.
- —. The Importance and Extent of Free Inquiry in Matters of Religion: a Sermon, preached before the Congregation of the Old and New Meeting of Protestant Dissenters at Birmingham. Birmingham: Printed by M. Swinney; for J. Johnson, London, 1785.
- —. Letters to Dr. Horsley, Part III. Birmingham: Printed by Pearson and Rollason, for J. Johnson, London, 1786.
- —. An History of the Early Opinions Concerning Jesus Christ . . . Proving that the Christian Religion Was at First Unitarian. Birmingham: Printed for the author, by Pearson and Rollason, and sold by J. Johnson, 1786.

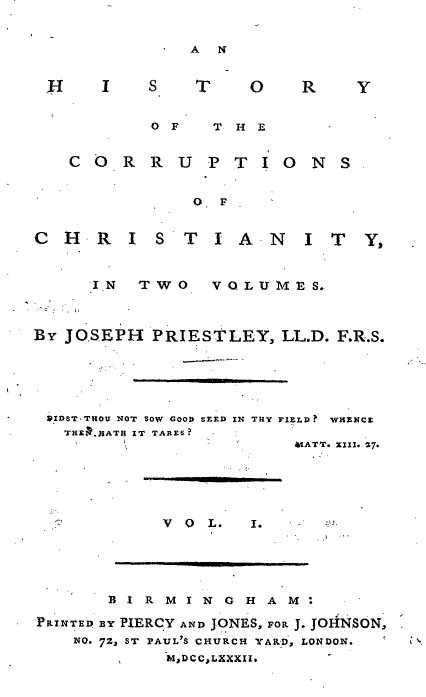
Title page from Priestley's An History of the Corruptions of Christianity

- —. Letters to the Jews; inviting them to an Amicable Discussion of the Evidences of Christianity. Birmingham: Printed by Pearson and Rollason; sold by J. Johnson, 1786.
- —. Letters to the Jews, Part II. Birmingham: Printed for the author, by Pearson and Rollason; sold by J. Johnson, London, 1787.
- —. Discourses on Various Subjects. Birmingham: Printed for the author, by Pearson and Rollason; sold by J. Johnson, London, 1787.
- —. Defences of Unitarianism for the Year 1786. London: n.p., 1787–90.
- —. Letters to Dr. Horne . . . to the Young Men, who are in a Course of Education for the Christian Ministry, at the Universities of Oxford and Cambridge. Birmingham: Printed for the author by Pearson and Rollason; sold by J. Johnson, London, 1787.
- —. Defences of Unitarianism for the Year 1787. Birmingham: Printed for the author by Pearson and Rollason; sold by J. Johnson, London, 1788.
- —. Letters to Dr. Geddes. Birmingham: n.p., 1788.
- —. A Sermon [on Luke 10:36-7] on the Subject of the Slave Trade; delivered to a Society of Protestant Dissenters, at the New Meeting, in Birmingham. Birmingham: Printed for the author by Pearson and Rollason; sold by J. Johnson, 1788.
- —. The Conduct to be Observed by Dissenters, in Order to Procure the Repeal of the Corporation and Test Acts, recommended in a Sermon [on 1 Cor. 7:21], preached before the Congregations of the Old and New Meetings, at Birmingham, November 5, 1789. Birmingham: Printed by J. Thompson; sold by J. Johnson, London, 1789.
- —. Defences of Unitarianism for the Years 1788 and 1789. Birmingham: Printed by J. Thompson, for J. Johnson, London, [c. 1790].
- —. Familiar Letters addressed to the Inhabitants of Birmingham, in Refutation of several Charges, advanced against the Dissenters. Birmingham: Printed by F. Thompson; and sold by J. Johnson, London, 1790.
- —. A View of Revealed Religion; A Sermon, preached at the Ordination of the Rev. William Field of Warwick, July 12, 1790. Birmingham: Printed by J. Thompson; sold by J. Johnson, London, 1790.
- —. Letters to the Rev. Edward Burn . . . in Answer to his, on the Infallibility of the Apostolic Testimony, concerning the Person of Christ. Birmingham: Printed by J. Thompson; sold by J. Johnson, London, 1790. (See Edward Burn for further details.)
- —. Letter to Candidates for Orders in Both Universities on Subscription to Articles of Religion. Cambridge and London: Sold by J & J. Merrill and J. Bowtell, Cambridge; D. Prince and J. Johnson, London, [1790].
- —. Reflection on Death: A Sermon [on Matt. 24:26], on Occasion of the Death of the Rev. Robert Robinson, of Cambridge, Delivered at the New Meeting in Birmingham, June 13, 1790. Birmingham: Printed by J. Belcher; sold by J. Johnson, London, 1790.
- —. The Evidence of the Resurrection of Jesus considered, in a Discourse first delivered in the Assembly-room at Buxton, on Sunday, September 19, 1790. Birmingham: Printed by J. Thompson, for J. Johnson, London, 1790.
- —. The Proper Objects of Education in the Present State of the World Represented in a Discourse delivered on Wednesday, April 27, 1791. At the Meeting-House in the Old-Jewry, London; to the Supporters of the New College at Hackney. London: J. Johnson, 1791.
- —. A Discourse [on Luke 20:38] on Occasion of the Death of Dr. Price; delivered at Hackney, on Sunday, May 1, 1791. London: Printed for J. Johnson, 1791.
- —. Letters to the Members of the New Jerusalem Church, formed by Baron Swedenborg. Birmingham: Printed by J. Thompson; sold by J. Johnson, London, 1791.
- —. An Address to the Methodists. Birmingham: Printed by Thomas Pearson; and sold by J. Johnson, London, 1791.
- —. The Evidences of the Resurrection of Jesus considered, in a Discourse . . . To which is added, an Address to the Jews. Birmingham: Printed for J. Thompson, for J. Johnson, London, 1791.
- —. The Duty of Forgiveness of Injuries: A Discourse [on Luke 23:24], intended to be delivered soon after the Riots in Birmingham. Birmingham: Printed by J. Thompson, for J. Johnson, London, 1791.
- —. A Particular Attention to the Instruction of the Young recommended, in a Discourse [on 2 Cor. 8:9], delivered at the Gravel-Pit Meeting, in Hackney, December 4, 1791, on entering on the Office of Pastor to the Congregation of Protestant Dissenters, assembling in that Place. London: Printed for J. Johnson, 1791.
- —. Letters to a Young Man, occasioned by Mr. Wakefield's Essay on Public Worship. London: Printed for J. Johnson, 1792.
- --. Dr. Watts's historical catechisms (The catechism of Scripture names for little children, The historical catechism for children and youth), with alterations. [Followed by] A catalogue of remarkable Scripture names, E.B. Robinson, Nottingham,1792.
- —. Letters to a Young Man, Part II. London: Printed for J. Johnson, 1793.
- —. Letters to the Philosophers and Politicians of France, on the Subject of Religion. London: Printed for J. Johnson, 1793.
- —. A Sermon [on Psalm 46:1] Preached at the Gravel-Pit Meeting in Hackney, April 19, 1793. Being the Day appointed for a General Fast. London: Printed for J. Johnson, 1793.
- —. A Continuation of Letters to the Philosophers and Politicians of France, on the Subject of Religion. Northumberland: Printed by Andrew Kennedy, 1794.
- —. An Answer to Mr. Paine's Age of Reason, being a Continuation of Letters to the Philosophers and Politicians of France on the Subject of Religion and of the Letters to a Philosophical Unbeliever. Northumberland: n.p., 1794.
- —. The Use of Christianity, especially in Difficult Times; a Sermon [on Acts 20:32] delivered at the Gravel Pit Meeting in Hackney, March 30, 1794, being the Author's Farewell Discourse to his Congregation. London: Printed for J. Johnson, 1794.
- —. Discourses on the Evidences of Revealed Religion. London: Printed for J. Johnson, 1794.
- —. The Present State of Europe compared with Ancient Prophecies; A Sermon [on Matt. 3:2], preached at the Gravel Pit Meeting in Hackney, February 28, 1794, being the Day appointed for a General Fast. With a Preface, containing the Reasons for the Author's leaving England. London: Printed for J. Johnson, 1794.
- —. Observations on the Increase of Infidelity. Northumberland: Printed by Andrew Kennedy, 1795.
- —. Unitarianism Explained and Defended. Philadelphia: Printed by John Thompson, 1796.
- —. An Address to the Unitarian Congregation at Philadelphia, delivered on Sunday, March 5, 1797. Philadelphia: Printed by Joseph Gales, 1797.
- —. Discourses relating to the Evidences of Revealed Religion. Published in 3 volumes. Philadelphia: Printed by T. Dobson, 1797.
- —. Letters to M. Volney, occasioned by a Work of his entitled Ruins. Philadelphia: Printed by Thomas Dobson, 1797.
- —. A Comparison of the Institutions of Moses with Those of the Hindoos and Other Ancient Nations. Northumberland: n.p., 1799.
- —. An Inquiry into the Knowledge of the Ancient Hebrews, concerning a Future State. London: Printed for J. Johnson, by D. Levi, 1801.
- —. A Letter to an Antipaedobaptist. Northumberland: Printed by Andrew Kennedy, 1802.
- —. A Letter to the Reverend John Blair Linn in Defense of Socrates and Jews Compared. Northumberland: n.p. 1803.
- —. A Second Letter to the Revd. John Blair Linn . . . in Reply to His Defense of the Doctrines of the Divinity of Christ and Atonement. Northumberland: Printed for P. Byrne, Philadelphia, by Andrew Kennedy, 1803.
- —. Notes on All the Books of Scripture, for the Use of the Pulpit and Private Families. Northumberland: Printed for the author by Andrew Kennedy, 1803.
- —. Socrates and Jesus Compared. Philadelphia: Printed by P. Byrne, 1803.
- —. The Originality and Superior Excellence of the Mosaic Institutions Demonstrated. Philadelphia: Printed by Andrew Kennedy, for P. Byrne, 1803.
- —. Doctrines of Heathen Philosophy, Compared with Those of Revelation. Northumberland: Printed by John Binns, 1804.
- —. Index to the Bible. Philadelphia: n.p., 1804.
- —. Four Discourses intended to have been delivered at Philadelphia. Northumberland: Printed by John Binns, 1806.
- —. The Importance of Religion to Enlarge the Mind of Man; Considered and Illustrated in a Sermon.. Birmingham: Printed and sold by J. Belcher & Son, 1808.
- —. A Sermon of behalf of the Leeds Infirmary Preached at Mill Hill Chapel [..] 1768. Leeds: Published by Richard Jackson, 1910 (first edition).

=== Theological papers ===
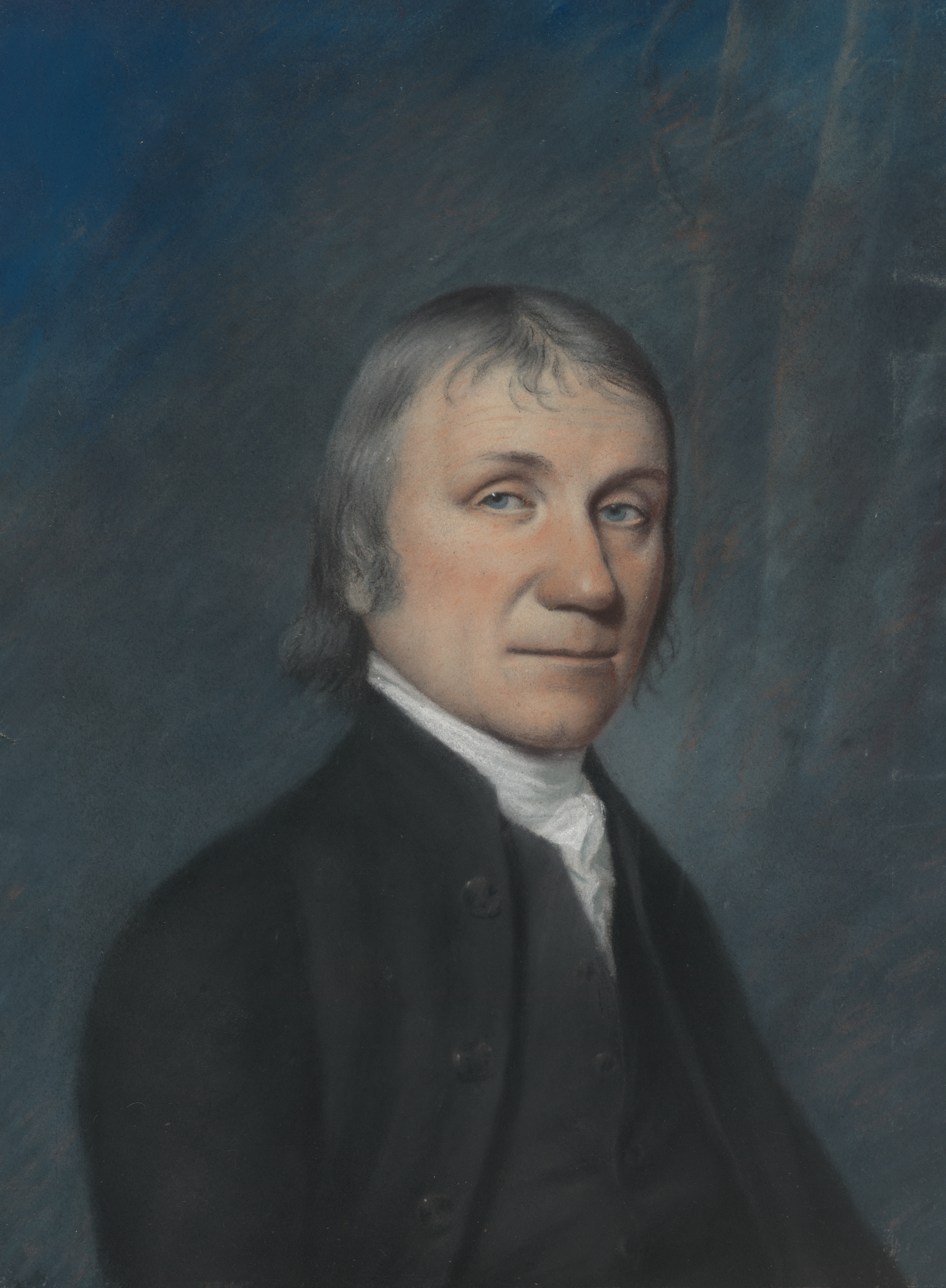
Priestley by James Sharples, c. 1797

This list of Priestley's theological papers is taken from the "Selected Bibliography" in Robert Schofield's biography of Priestley.

- —. "Essay on the Harmony of the Evangelists." Theological Repository 2 (1770): 38–59, 98–122, 230–47, 313–27.
- —. "Remarks on Romans v.12-14." Theological Repository 2 (1770): 154–58.
- —. "Observations concerning Melchizadeck." Theological Repository 2 (1770): 283–90.
- —. "Observations on the Abrahamic Covenant." Theological Repository 2 (1770): 396–411.
- —. "Observations on Romans v.12 &c." Theological Repository 2 (1770): 411–16.
- —. "Observations on the Harmony of the Evangelists." Theological Repository 3 (1771): 462–69.
- —. "An Essay on the Analogy there is between the Methods by which the Perfection and Happiness of Men are promoted according to the Dispensations of Natural and Revealed Religion." Theological Repository 3 (1771): 3-31.
- —. "Observations on Christ's Agony in the Garden." Theological Repository 3 (1771): 376–82.
- —. "Observations on the Importance of Faith in Christ." Theological Repository 3 (1771): 239–43.
- —. "Conclusion." Theological Repository 3 (1771): 477–82.
- —. "Observations on Infant Baptism." Theological Repository 3 (1771): 231–39.
- —. "The Socinian Hypothesis Vindicated." Theological Repository 3 (1771): 344–63.
- —. "A Criticism on 1 Corinthians xv.27" Theological Repository 3 (1771): 255–56.
- —. "Remarks on the Reasonings of St. Paul." Theological Repository 3 (1771): 86–105, 188–212.
- —. "Observations on Christ's Proof of a Resurrection, from the Books of Moses." Theological Repository 1 (2nd ed., 1773): 300–303.
- —. "Observations on the Apostleship of Matthias." Theological Repository 1 (2nd ed., 1773): 376–81.
- —. "An Essay on the One Great End of the Life and Death of Christ, Intended more especially to refute the commonly received Doctrine of Atonement." Theological Repository 1 (2nd ed., 1773): 17–45, 121–36, 195–218, 247–67, 327–53, 400–30.
- —. "Introduction." Theological Repository 4 (1784): iii-xvi.
- —. "Observations on Inspiration." Theological Repository 4 (1784): 17–26.
- —. "Observations relating to the Inspiration of Moses." Theological Repository 4 (1784): 27–38.
- —. "Of the Island on which the Apostle Paul was shipwrecked." Theological Repository 4 (1784): 39–49.
- —. "Remarks on Dr. Taylor's Key to the Apostolic Writings." Theological Repository 4 (1784): 57–69.
- —. "A Query relating to the Rise of the Arian Doctrine." Theological Repository 4 (1784): 70–72.
- —. "A Conjectural Emendation of Exod. xxiii:23." Theological Repository 4 (1784): 73–74.
- —. "An Addition to the Paper, signed HERMAS, relating to the Island on which Paul was shipwrecked." Theological Repository 4 (1784): 75.
- —. "A Query relating to the Doctrine of Plato, concerning the Divine Essence." Theological Repository 4 (1784): 76.
- —. "Of the Doctrine of Plato concerning God, and the general System of Nature." Theological Repository 4 (1784): 77–97.
- —. "Observations on the Prophets of the Old Testament." Theological Repository 4 (1784): 97–122.
- —. "Animadversions on the Preface to the new edition of Ben Mordecai's Letters." Theological Repository 4 (1784): 180–86.
- —. "A Proposal for correcting the English Translation of the Scriptures." Theological Repository 4 (1784): 187–88.
- —. "Observations on the Inspiration of the Apostles." Theological Repository 4 (1784): 189–210.
- —. "Observations on the Miraculous Conception." Theological Repository 4 (1784): 245–305.
- —. "The History of the Arian Controversy." Theological Repository 4 (1784): 306–37.
- —. "An Attempt to shew that Arians are not Unitarians." Theological Repository 4 (1784): 338–44.
- —. "An Illustration of the Promise made to Abraham." Theological Repository 4 (1784): 361–3.
- —. "A View of the Principles of the later Platonists." Theological Repository 4 (1784): 381–407.
- —. "Of the Platonism of Philo." Theological Repository 4 (1784): 408–20.
- —. "Observations on the Inspiration of Christ." Theological Repository 4 (1784): 433–61.
- —. "Observations on the Prophecy concerning Shiloh." Theological Repository 4 (1784): 473–76.
- —. "Of the Pre-existence of the Messiah." Theological Repository 4 (1784): 477–83.
- —. "Observations on the Roman Census, mentioned Luke ii.1, unfavourable to the miraculous Conception." Theological Repository 5 (1786): 90–99.
- —. "Miscellaneous Observations of the same Nature." 'Theological Repository 5 (1786): 100-108.
- —. "A Supplement to the Illustration of the Promise made to Abraham." Theological Repository 5 (1786): 108-10.
- —. "Observations on the Prophecies of the Old Testament quoted in the New." Theological Repository 5 (1786): 111-23.
- —. "Observations on the Quotation of Isaiah, ix.1, 2. by the Evangelist Matthew." Theological Repository 5 (1786): 123-28.
- —. "Observations on the Prophecies relating to the Messiah, and the future glory of the House of David." Theological Repository 5 (1786): 210-42, 301-16.
- —. "An Attempt to prove the perpetual Obligation of the Jewish Ritual." Theological Repository 5 (1786): 403-44.
- —. "Of the Perpetuity of the Jewish Ritual." Theological Repository 6 (1788): 1-21.
- —. "Difficulties in the Interpretation of some Prophecies not yet fulfilled, and Queries relating to Them." Theological Repository 6 (1788): 203-208.
- —. "An Account of the Rev. John Palmer, and of some Articles intended by him for this Repository." Theological Repository 6 (1788): 217-24. Refers to the minister John Palmer, who died in 1786.
- —. "Observations on Christ's Agony in the Garden." Theological Repository 6 (1788): 302-22.
- —. "Postscript to the Article signed PAMPHILUS, relating to a Case of bloody Sweat." Theological Repository 6 (1788): 347-48.
- —. "A Query relating to the Origin of the low Arian Doctrine." Theological Repository 6 (1788): 376-82.
- —. "Queries relating to the Religion of Indostan." Theological Repository 6 (1788): 408-14.
- —. "The Observance of the Lord's Day vindicated." Theological Repository 6 (1788): 465-83.
- —. "Of the Origin of the Arian Hypothesis." Theological Repository 6 (1788): 484-90.
- —. "To the Public." Theological Repository 6 (1788): 491–93.

== Political and social works ==
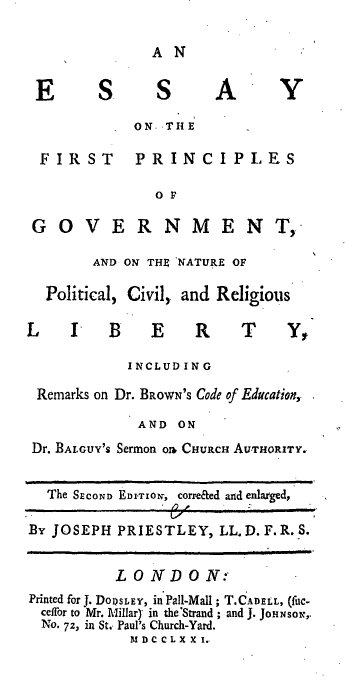
Title page from the second edition of Priestley's Essay on Government

- —. Essay on the First Principles of Government. London: Printed for J. Dodsley; T. Cadell; and J. Johnson, 1768.
- —. The Present State of Liberty in Great Britain and her Colonies. London: n.p., 1769.
- —. Remarks on Some Paragraphs in the Fourth Volume of Dr. Blackstone's Commentaries on the Laws of England relating to Dissenters. London: Printed for J. Johnson and J. Payne, 1769.
- —. A View of the Principles and Conduct of the Protestant Dissenters, with respect to the Civil and Ecclesiastical Constitution of England. London: Printed for J. Johnson and J. Payne, 1769.
- —. A Free Address to Protestant Dissenters, as Such. London: Printed for G. Pearch, 1769.
- —. Considerations on Church-authority. London: Printed for J. Johnson and J. Payne, 1769.
- —. An Answer to Dr. Blackstone's Reply. Dublin: Printed for James Williams, 1770.
- —. A Letter of Advice to those Dissenters who conduct the Application to Parliament for Relief from certain Penal Laws. London: Printed for J. Johnson, 1773.
- —. An Address to Protestant Dissenters of all Denominations on the Approaching Election of Members of Parliament, with Respect to the State of Public Liberty in General, and of American Affairs in Particular. London: Printed for Joseph Johnson, 1774.
- —. A Free Address to those who have Petitioned for the Repeal of the late Act of Parliament in Favour of Roman Catholics. London: Printed for J. Johnson, 1780.
- —. A Letter to the Right Honourable William Pitt . . . on the Subjects of Toleration and Church Establishments; Occasioned by his Speech against the Repeal of the Test and Corporation Acts, on Wednesday the 28th of March 1787. London: Printed for J. Johnson, 1787.
- —. The Duty of Forgiveness of Injuries. Birmingham: Printed for J. Thompson for J. Johnson, London, 1791.
- —. A Political Dialogue on the General Principles of Government. London: n.p., 1791. [Schofield questions the attribution of this to Priestley]
- —. An Appeal to the Public on the Subject of the Riots in Birmingham. Birmingham: Printed by J. Thompson; sold by J. Johnson, 1791.
- —. Letters to the Right Honourable Edmund Burke, occasioned by his Reflections on the Revolution in France. Birmingham: Printed by Thomas Pearson; sold by J. Johnson, 1791.
- —. An Appeal to the Public on the Subject of the Riots in Birmingham, Part II. London: J. Johnson, 1792.
- —. The Case of Poor Emigrants Recommended. Philadelphia: Printed by Joseph Gales; sold by W. Y. Birch, 1797.
- —. Letters to the Inhabitants of Northumberland. Northumberland: n.p., 1799.

== Educational works ==
- —. The Rudiments of English Grammar adapted to the Use of Schools. London: Printed for R. Griffiths, 1761.
- —. A Course of Lectures on the Theory of Language and Universal Grammar. Warrington: Printed by W. Eyres, 1762.
- —. Considerations for the Use of Young Men and the Parents of Young Men. London: Printed for J. Johnson, 1776.
- —. A Course of Lectures on Oratory and Criticism. London: Printed for J. Johnson, 1777.
- —. Miscellaneous Observations Relating to Education. Bath: Printed by R. Cruttwell, for J. Johnson, 1778.
- —. The Proper Objects of Education in the Present State of the World. London: Printed for J. Johnson, 1791.

== Philosophical and metaphysical works ==
- —. An Examination of Dr. Reid's Inquiry into the Human Mind. London: Printed for J. Johnson, 1774.
- —. Hartley's Theory of the Human Mind on the Principle of the Association of Ideas, with Essays relating to the Subject of It. London: Printed for J. Johnson, 1775.
- —. Philosophical Empiricism. London: Printed for J. Johnson, 1775.
- —. Disquisitions relating to Matter and Spirit. London: Printed for J. Johnson, 1777.
- —. The Doctrine of Philosophical Necessity Illustrated. London: Printed for J. Johnson, 1777.
- —. A Free Discussion of the Doctrines of Materialism, and Philosophical Necessity. London: Printed for J. Johnson, 1778.
- —. A Letter to the Rev. Mr. John Palmer, in Defence of the Illustrations of Philosophical Necessity. Bath: Printed for R. Cruttwell; sold by J. Johnson, London, 1779.
- —. A Second Letter to the Rev. Mr. John Palmer London: Printed by H. Baldwin, for J. Johnson, 1780.
- —. Letters to a Philosophical Unbeliever. Bath: Printed by R. Cruttwell; sold by J. Johnson, London, 1780.
- —. A Letter to Jacob Bryant Esq. in Defence of Philosophical Necessity. London: Printed by H. Baldwin, for J. Johnson, 1780.
- —. Additional Letters to a Philosophical Unbeliever. Birmingham: Printed by Pearson and Rollason, for J. Johnson, London, 1782.
- —. Letters to a Philosophical Unbeliever, Part II. Birmingham: Printed by Pearson and Rollason, for J. Johnson, London, 1787.
- —. Letters to a Philosophical Unbeliever, Part III. Philadelphia: Printed by Thomas Dobson, 1795.

== Historical works ==
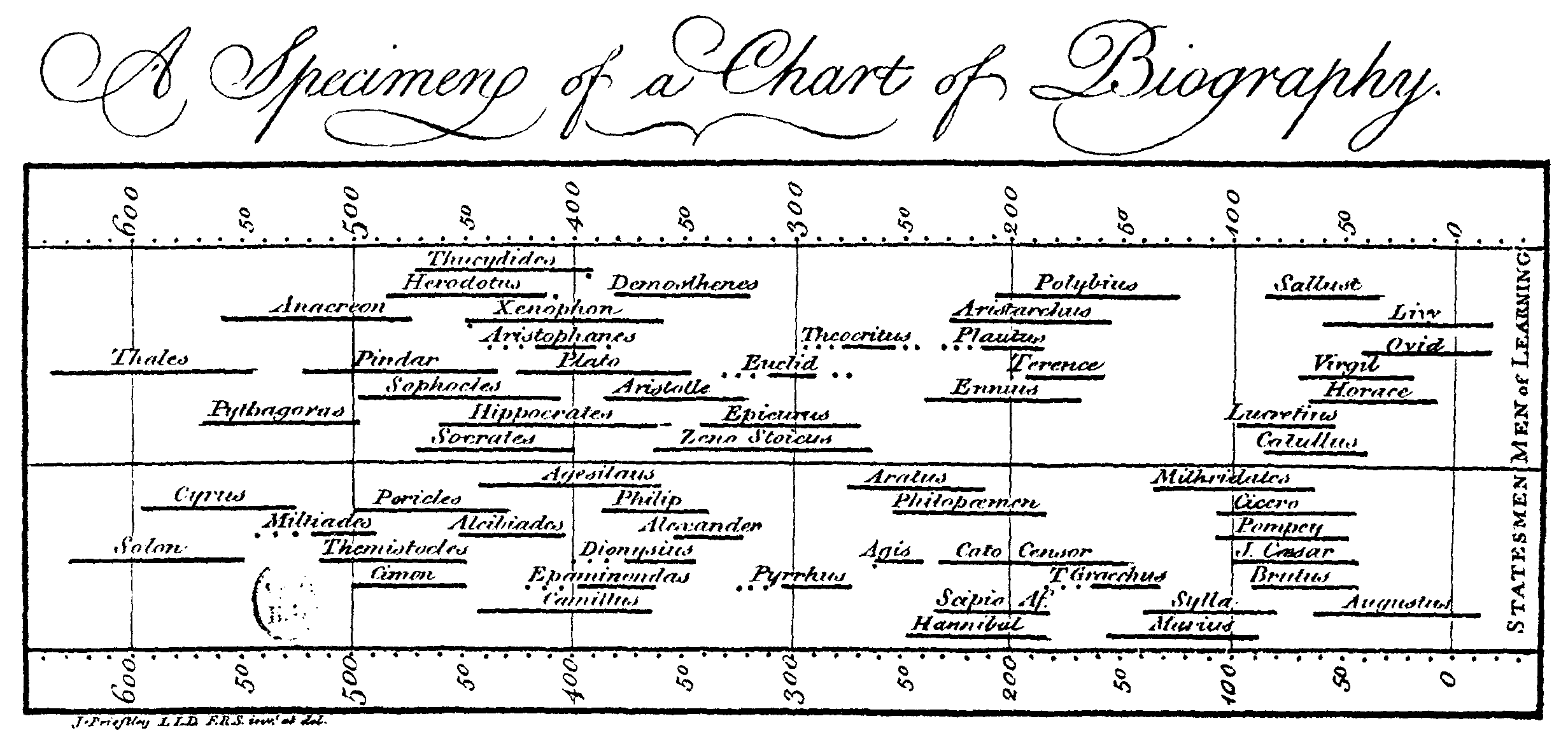
A redacted version of Priestley's Chart of Biography

- —. A Syllabus of a Course of Lectures on the Study of History. Warrington: Printed by William Eyre, 1765.
- —. A Chart of Biography. London: J. Johnson, 1765.
- —. A Description of a Chart of Biography. Warrington: Printed by William Eyres, 1765.
- —. Essay on a Course of Liberal Education for Civil and Active Life. London: Printed for C. Henderson; T. Becket and De Hondt; and by J. Johnson and Davenport, 1765.
- —. A New Chart of History. London: J. Johnson, 1769.
- —. A Description of a New Chart of History. London: Printed for J. Johnson, 1770.
- —. Lectures on History and General Policy. Birmingham: Printed by Pearson and Rollason, for J. Johnson, London, 1788.
- —. A General History of the Christian Church, to the Fall of the Western Empire. Birmingham: Printed by Thomas Pearson; sold by J. Johnson, 1790.
- —. A General History of the Christian Church from the Fall of the Western Empire to the Present Time. Northumberland: Printed for the Author, by Andrew Kennedy, 1802.
- —. A Description of a System of Biography with a Catalogue of All the Names Inserted in it and the Dates Annexed to Them. Philadelphia: Printed by Akerman & Hancock for Mathew Carey, 1803.
- —. Memoirs of Dr. Joseph Priestley, to the Year 1795, written by himself. London: Printed for J. Johnson, 1806.

== Scientific works ==
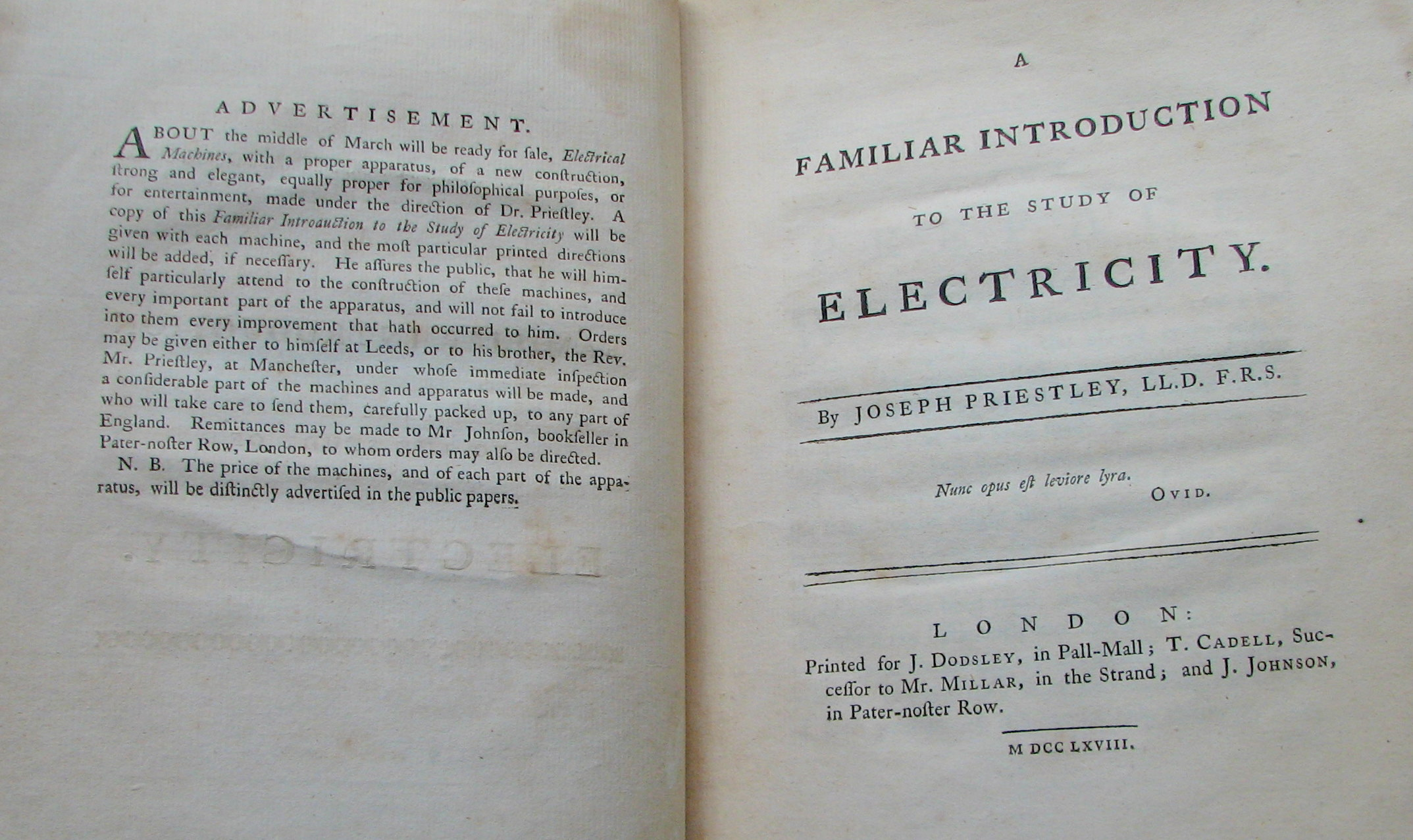
Title page from Priestley's Familiar Introduction to Electricity

- —. The History and Present State of Electricity. London: Printed for J. Dodsley, J. Johnson and B. Davenport, and T. Cadell, 1767.
- —. Familiar Introduction to the Study of Electricity. London: Printed for J. Dodsley; T. Cadell; and J. Johnson, 1768.
- —. A Familiar Introduction to the Theory and Practice of Perspective. London: Printed for J. Johnson and J. Payne, 1770.
- —. The History and Present State of Discoveries Relating to Vision, Light, and Colours London: Printed for J. Johnson, 1772.
- —. Directions for Impregnating Water with Fixed Air. London: Printed for J. Johnson, 1772.
- —. Experiments and Observations on Different Kinds of Air. Vol. 1. London: W. Bowyer and J. Nichols, 1774.
- —. Experiments and Observations on Different Kinds of Air. Vol. 2. London: Printed for J. Johnson, 1775.
- —. Experiments and Observations on Different Kinds of Air. Vol. 3. London: Printed for J. Johnson, 1777.
- —. Experiments and Observations relating to various Branches of Natural Philosophy, Vol. 1, [Experiments and Observations on Different Kinds of Air, Vol. 4]. London: Printed for J. Johnson, 1779.
- —. Experiments and Observations relating to various Branches of Natural Philosophy, Vol. 2, [Experiments and Observations on Different Kinds of Air, Vol. 5]. Birmingham: Printed by Pearson and Rollason, for J. Johnson, London, 1781.
- —. Experiments Relating to Phlogiston. London: n.p., 1784.
- —. Experiments and Observations relating to various Branches of Natural Philosophy, Vol. 3, [Experiments and Observations on Different Kinds of Air, Vol.6]. Birmingham: Printed by Pearson and Rollason; sold by J. Johnson, 1786.
- —. Experiments and Observations on Different Kinds of Air. In 3 volumes, being the former 6 abridged and methodized, with many additions. Birmingham, 1790.
- —. Experiments on the Generation of Air from Water; to which are prefixed, Experiments relating to the Decomposition of Dephlogisticated and Inflammable Air. London: Printed for J. Johnson, 1793.
- —. Heads of Lectures on a Course of Experimental Philosophy, particularly including Chemistry; delivered at the New College in Hackney. London: Printed for J. Johnson, 1794.
- —. Considerations on the Doctrine of Phlogiston and the Decomposition of Water. Philadelphia: n.p., 1796.
- —. Experiments and Observations relating to the Analysis of Atmospherical Air; also farther Experiments relating to the Generation of Air from Water. [Red before the American Philosophical Society, Feb.5th and 19th in 1796, and printed in their Transactions. To which are added, Considerations on the Doctrine of Phlogiston, and the Decomposition of Water, addressed to Messrs. Berthollet &c]. London: J. Johnson, 1796.
- —. Considerations on the Doctrine of Phlogiston and the Decomposition of Water, Part II. Philadelphia: Thomas Dobson, 1797.
- —. Doctrine of Phlogiston established and that of the Composition of Water refuted. Northumberland: Printed for the author by A. Kennedy, 1800.
- —. Doctrine of Phlogiston established, with Observations on the Conversion of Iron into Steel, in a Letter to Mr. Nicholson. Printed in 1803.

=== Scientific papers ===
This list of Priestley's scientific papers is taken from the "Selected Bibliography" in Robert Schofield's biography of Priestley.

- —. "An Account of Rings consisting of all the Prismatic Colours, made by Electrical Explosions on the Surface of Pieces of Metal." Philosophical Transactions 58 (1768): 68–74.
- —. "Experiments on the lateral Force of Electrical Explosions." Philosophical Transactions 59 (1769): 57–62.
- —. "Various Experiments on the Force of Electrical Explosions." Philosophical Transactions 59 (1769): 63–70.
- —. An Investigation of the Lateral Explosion, and of the Electricity communicated to the electrical circuit in a Discharge." Philosophical Transactions 60 (1770): 211-27.
- —. "Experiments and Observations on Charcoal." Philosophical Transactions 60 (1770): 211–27.
- —. "Experiments and Observations on Acidity, Composition of Water, and Phlogiston." The Biographical and Imperial Magazine 3 (1770):9-10.
- —. "Observations on different Kinds of Air." Philosophical Transactions 62 (1772): 147–264.
- —. "On the noxious Quality of the Effluvia of putrid Marshes." Philosophical Transactions 64 (1774): 90–95.
- —. "An Account of further Discoveries in Air." Philosophical Transactions 65 (1775): 384–94.
- —. "Observations on Respiration and the Use of the Blood." Philosophical Transactions 66 (1776): 226–48.
- —. "Experiments relating to Phlogiston, and the seeming Conversion of Water into Air." Philosophical Transactions 73 (1783): 398–434.
- —. "Experiments and Observations relating to Air and Water." Philosophical Transactions 75 (1785): 279–309.
- —. "Experiments and Observations relating to the Principle of Acidity, the Composition of Water, and Phlogiston." Philosophical Transactions 78 (1788): 147–57.
- —. "Additional Experiments and Observations relating to the Principle of Acidity, the Decomposition of Water, and Phlogiston." Philosophical Transactions (1788): 313–30.
- —. "Objections to the Experiments and Observations relating to the Principle of Acidity, the Composition of Water, and Phlogiston, considered." Philosophical Transactions 79 (1789): 7-20.
- —. "Experiments on the Phlogistication of Spirit of Nitre." Philosophical Transactions 79 (1789): 139–49.
- —. "Experiments on the Transmission of Vapour of Acids through a hot Earthen Tube, and further Observations relating to Phlogiston." Philosophical Transactions 79 (1789): 289–99.
- —. "Observations on Respiration." Philosophical Transactions 80 (1790): 106–10.
- —. "Farther Experiments relating to the Decomposition of dephlogisticated and inflammable air." Philosophical Transactions 81 (1791): 213–22.
- —. "An Interesting Letter from Dr. Priestley, concerning the principles of the New Theory of Chemistry." Monthly Magazine 5 (1798): 159–60.
- —. "A Letter to Dr. Mitchill, in reply to the proceeding [Attempt to accommodate the Dispute among Chemists concerning Phlogiston]." New York Medical Repository 1 (1798): 511–12.
- —. "Experiments and Observations relating to the Analysis of Atmospherical Air." Transactions of the American Philosophical Society 4 (1799): 1–11.
- —. "Further Experiments relating to the Generation of Air from Water." Transactions of the American Philosophical Society 4 (1799): 11–20.
- —. "A Second Letter from Dr. Priestley to Dr. Mitchill." New York Medical Repository 2 (1799): 48–49.
- —. "On Red precipitate of Mercury as favourable to the Doctrine of Phlogiston." New York Medical Repository 2 (1799): 163–65.
- —. "Objections to the Antiphlogistic Doctrine of Water." New York Medical Repository 2 (1799): 166–67.
- —. "Experiments relating to the Calces of Metals." New York Medical Repository 2 (1799): 263–68.
- —. "Of some Experiments made with Ivory Black and also with Diamonds." New York Medical Repository 2 (1799): 269–71.
- —. "Of the Phlogistic Theory." New York Medical Repository 2 (1799): 383–87.
- —. "On the same Subject." New York Medical Repository 2 (1799): 388–89.
- —. "Dr. Priestley's Reply to his Antiphlogistian Opponents, No. 1." New York Medical Repository 3 (1800): 116–21.
- —. "Dr. Priestley's Reply to his Antiphlogistian Opponents, No. 2." New York Medical Repository 3 (1800): 121–24.
- —. "Dr. Priestley's Reply to his Antiphlogistian Opponents, No. 3." New York Medical Repository 3 (1800): 124–27.
- —. "Singular Effects of Gaseous Oxyd of Septon (dephlogisticated Nitrous Air)." New York Medical Repository 3 (1800): 305.

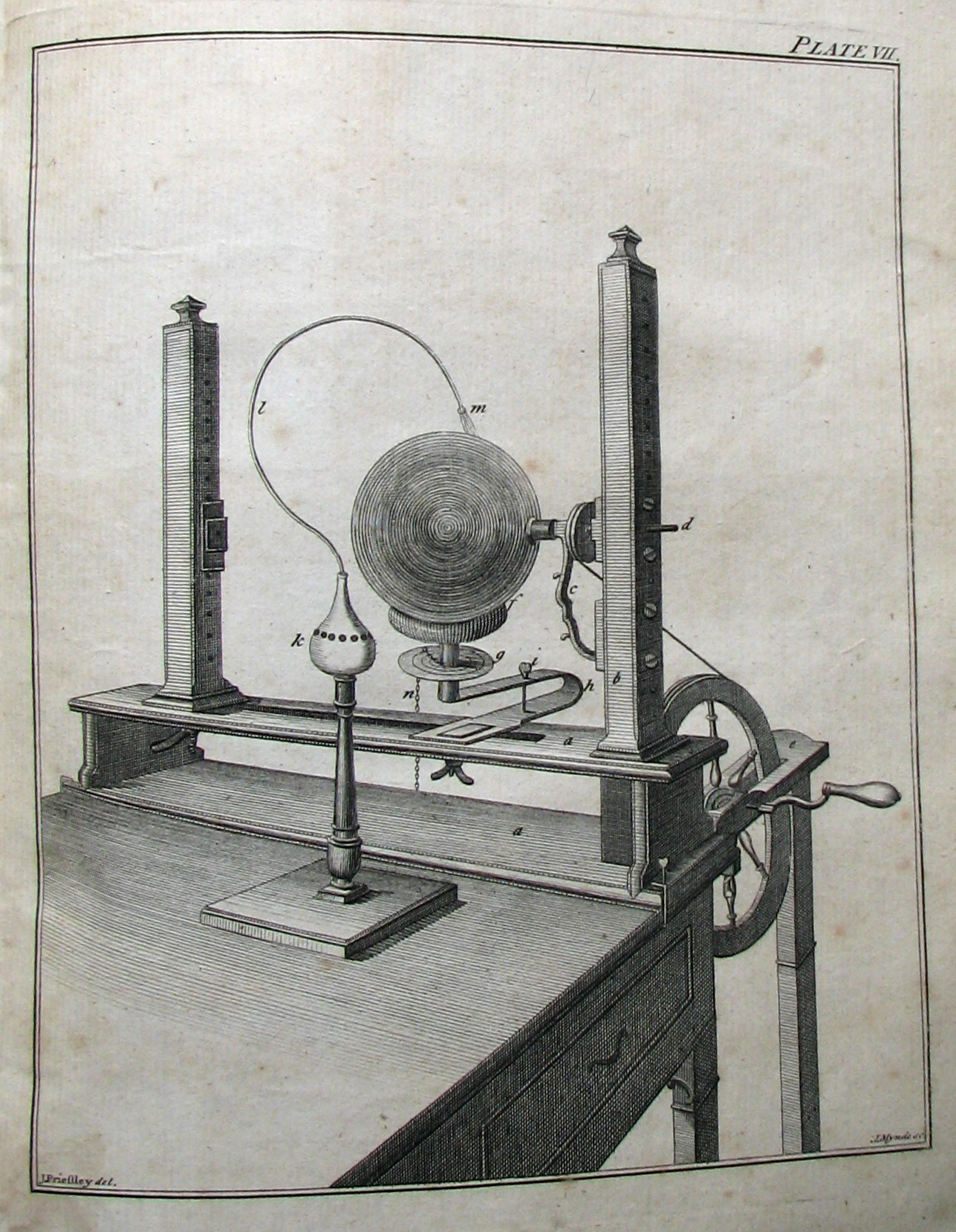
Priestley's electrical machine, illustrated in the first edition of his Familiar Introduction to Electricity

- —. "Priestley's Sentiments on the Doctrines of Septon." New York Medical Repository 3 (1800): 307.
- —. "Air produced, without Limitation, from Water by freezing." New York Medical Repository 3 (1800): 422–23.
- —. "Experiments on the Production of Air by the Freezing of Water." New York Medical Repository 4 (1801): 17–21.
- —. "To the Editor of the Medical Repository." [Correcting a review of his tract on phlogiston.] New York Medical Repository 4 (1801): 103.
- —. "Experiments heating Manganese in Inflammable Air." New York Medical Repository 4 (1801): 135–37.
- —. "Experiments tending to show that Azote is a compound of Hydrogen and Oxygen." New York Medical Repository 4 (1801): 192–94.
- —. "Some Observations relating to the Sense of Hearing." New York Medical Repository 4 (1801): 247–48.
- —. "Experiments on the Transmissions of Acids, and other Liquors, in the form of Vapour, over Several Substances in a hot earth tube." Transactions of the American Philosophical Society 5 (1802): 1–13.
- —. "Experiments relating to the Change of Place in different kinds of Air through several interposing Substances." Transactions of the American Philosophical Society 5 (1802): 14–20.
- —. "Experiments relating to the Absorption of Air by Water." Transactions of the American Philosophical Society 5 (1802): 21–27.
- —. "Miscellaneous Experiments relating to the Doctrine of Phlogiston." Transactions of the American Philosophical Society 5 (1802): 28–35.
- —. "Experiments on Air exposed to Heat in Metallic Tubes." Transactions of the American Philosophical Society 5 (1802): 42–50.
- —. "Remarks on the Work entitled 'A Brief History of Epidemic and Pestilential Diseases.'" New York Medical Repository 5 (1802): 32–36.
- —. "Some Thoughts concerning Dreams." New York Medical Repository 5 (1802): 125–29.
- —. "Observations and Experiments relating to the Pile of Volta." New York Medical Repository 5 (1802): 153–59.
- —. "Miscellaneous Observations relating to the Doctrine of Air." New York Medical Repository 5 (1802): 264–67.
- —. "A Reply to Mr. Cruickshank's Observations in Defence of the New System of Chemistry." New York Medical Repository 5 (1802): 390–92.
- —. "Additional Remarks on the Same." New York Medical Repository 5 (1802): 393.
- —. "On the Theory of Chemistry." Journal of Natural Philosophy, Chemistry, and the Arts 2 (1802): 69–70.
- —. "A Letter to the Editor." Monthly Magazine 14 (1802): 2–3.
- —. "Observations on the Conversion of Iron into Steel." Journal of Natural Philosophy, Chemistry, and the Arts 2 (1802): 223–34.
- —. "Additional Remarks on Mr. Cruickshank's Experiments on Finery Cinder and Charcoal." New York Medical Repository 6 (1803): 271–73.
- —. "On Air from Finery cinder and Charcoal with other Remarks on the Experiments and Observations of Mr. Cruickshank." Journal of Natural Philosophy, Chemistry, and the Arts 3 (1803): 65–69.
- —. "Answer to the Observations of Mr. William Cruickshank upon the Doctrine of Phlogiston." Journal of Natural Philosophy, Chemistry, and the Arts 3 (1803): 65–69.
- —. "Observations and Experiments relating to equivocal, or spontaneous Generation." Transactions of the American Philosophical Society 6 (1809): 119–29.
- —. "Observations on the Discovery of Nitre, in common Salt, which had been frequently mixed with Snow." Transactions of the American Philosophical Society 6 (1809): 129–32.

The following items are Scientific Papers not included in the above list:

- —. "Of the Invention of Telescopes and Microscopes, with their First Improvements." The Literary and Biographical Magazine and British Review, 10 (1793): 407–11.
- —. "Experiments and Observations on the Analysis of Atmospherical Air from Water", Monthly Review, 8pp. (1796).
- —. "The Doctrine of Phlogiston established and the Composition of Water refuted", Monthly Review, 6pp. (1801).
- —. "The Doctrine of Phlogiston established and the Composition of Water refuted", Monthly Review, 6pp. (1801).
- —, Hepburn, Joseph, "New Priestley Letter on his Scientific and Educational Experiments", Library Bulletin of the American Philosophical Society, Philadelphia, PA, 1946, p.78-82.

== Works edited by Priestley ==
This list of Priestley's edited works is taken from the "Selected Bibliography" in Robert Schofield's biography of Priestley.

- Ellwall. Edward. The Triumph of Truth. 2nd ed. Leeds: J. Binns, 1771.
- An Account of a Society for Encouraging the Industrious Poor. Birmingham: Pearson and Rollason, 1787. [Priestley wrote the Preface]
- An History of the Suffering of Mr. Lewis de Marolles, and Mr. Isaac LeFevre, upon the Revocation of the Edict of Nantz. Birmingham: for J. Johnson, 1788.
- The Holy Bible, containing the Old and New Testaments; also the Apocrypha; translated out of the Original Tongues, with Annotations. Birmingham: Pearson and Rollason, 1778–79.
- Original Letters by the Rev. John Wesley and his Friends. Birmingham: for J. Johnson, 1791.
- Collins, Anthony. A Philosophical Inquiry concerning Human Liberty, Republished with a Preface by Joseph Priestley. n.l.: n.p., 1790.
- Hawkes, William and Joseph Priestley. Psalms and Hymns for the Use of the New Meeting in Birmingham. Birmingham: J. Thompson, 1790.
- The Theological Repository. Birmingham: for J. Johnson, 1773–78. [Periodical]

== Selected collected works ==
- —. The Theological and Miscellaneous Works of Joseph Priestley. Ed. John Towill Rutt. London: 1817–31. Reprinted in 1972.
- —. Scientific Correspondence of Joseph Priestley Ed. Henry Carrington Bolton. New York: Privately printed, 1892.
- —. A Scientific Autobiography of Joseph Priestley: Selected Scientific Correspondence. Ed. Robert E. Schofield. Cambridge: MIT Press, 1966.

== Links to online works in full-text ==
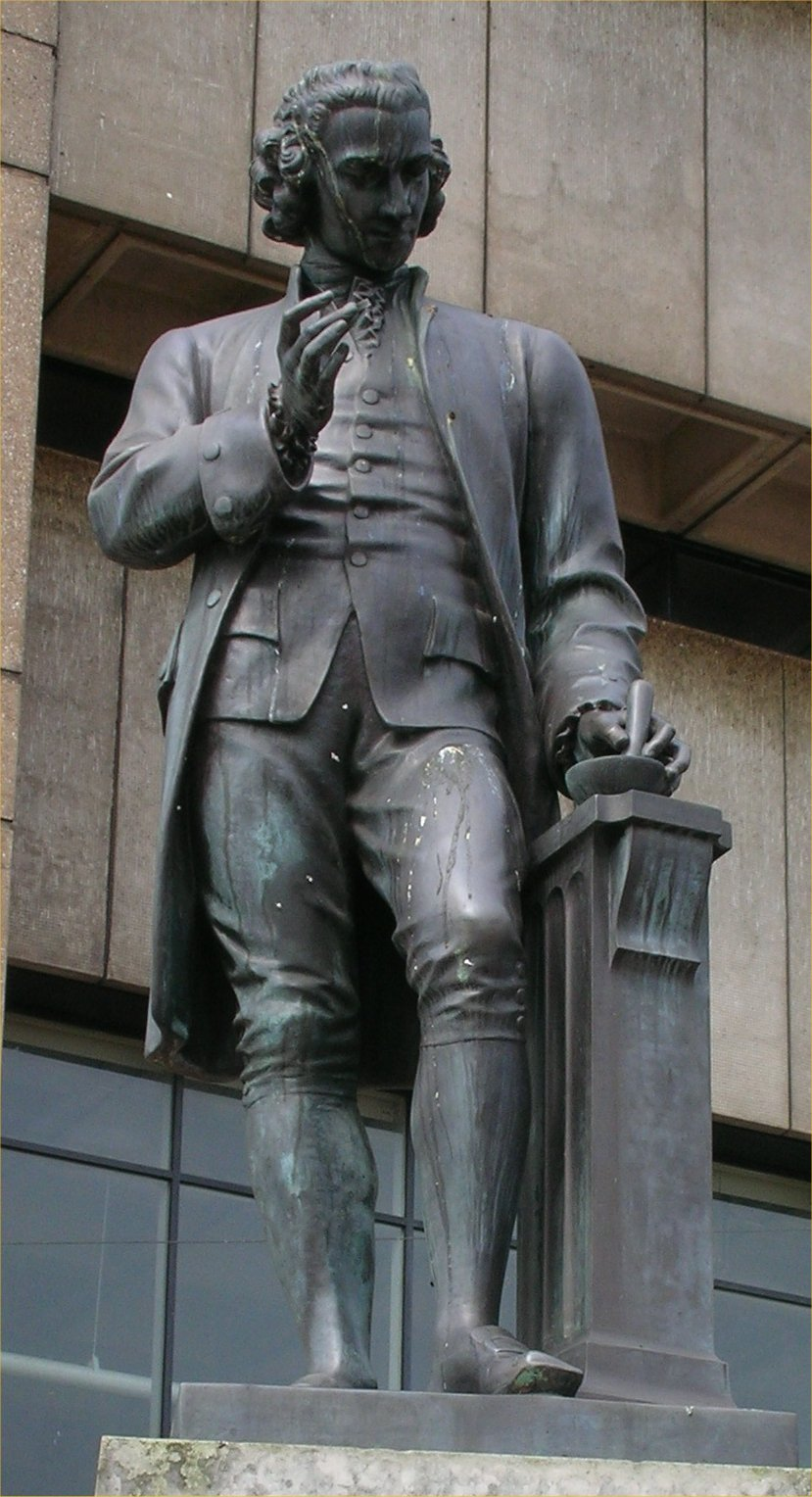
Statue of Priestley in Chamberlain Square, Birmingham

- Works by Joseph Priestley at Project Gutenberg
- Works by or about List of works by Joseph Priestley at the Internet Archive
- Works by List of works by Joseph Priestley at LibriVox (public domain audiobooks)

Theological and religious works:

- —. A free address to Protestant dissenters, on the subject of the Lord's Supper. 3rd ed. London: Printed for J.Johnson, 1774 (1.ed.1768).
- —. Considerations on Differences of Opinion among Christians. London: Printed for J. Johnson and J. Payne, 1769.
- —. Additions to the Address to Protestant Dissenters, on the Subject of the Lord's Supper. London: Printed for Joseph Johnson, 1770.
- —. A Familiar Illustration of Certain Passages of Scripture relating to the power of man to do the Will of God, Original Sin, Election and Reprobation, the Divinity of Christ and Atonement for Sin by the Death of Christ. London: Printed for Joseph Johnson, 1812. (1.ed.1770).
- —. Institutes of Natural and Revealed Religion. Vol. 1 of 2. 3rd ed. London: Printed by Rollason and Pearson; for J.Johnson, 1794 (1.ed.1782).
- —. Institutes of Natural and Revealed Religion. Vol. 2 of 2. 2nd ed. Birmingham: Printed by Rollason and Pearson; for J.Johnson, 1782.
- —. An History of the Corruptions of Christianity, in two volumes. London: British and Foreign Unitarian Association, 1871 (1.ed.1782).
- —. Letters to Dr. Horsley: In Answer to His Animadversion on the History of the Corruptions of Christianity. Birmingham: Printed by Pearson and Rollason, for J.Johnson, 1783.
- —. A Reply to the Animadversions on the History of the Corruptions of Christianity. Birmingham: Printed by Piercy & Jones, for J.Johnson, 1783.
- —. Forms of Prayer and other Offices for the Use of Unitarian Societies. Birmingham: Printed by Pearson and Rollason, for J. Johnson, London, 1783.
- —. An History of Early Opinions Concerning Jesus Christ. Vol. 1. Birmingham: Printed by Pearson and Rollason; for J.Johnson, 1786.
- —. An History of Early Opinions Concerning Jesus Christ. Vol. 2. Birmingham: Printed by Pearson and Rollason; for J.Johnson, 1786.
- —. An History of Early Opinions Concerning Jesus Christ. Vol. 3. Birmingham: Printed by Pearson and Rollason; for J.Johnson, 1786.
- —. An History of Early Opinions Concerning Jesus Christ. Vol. 4. Birmingham: Printed by Pearson and Rollason; for J.Johnson, 1786.
- —. Letters to Dr. Horne, ... , to the Young Men who are in a Course of Education for the Christian Ministry at the Universities of Oxford or Cambridge. Birmingham: Printed by Pearson and Rollason; for J.Johnson, 1787.
- —. Familiar Letters, Addressed to the Inhabitants of Birmingham. Birmingham: Printed by J.Thompson; for J.Johnson, 1790.
- —. The Doctrines of Heathen Philosophy compared with those of Revelation. Northumberland: Printed by John Binns, 1804.
- —. Discourses on Various Subjects, Intended to have been delivered in Philadelphia. Northumberland: Printed by John Binns, 1805.

Political and social works:

- —. A Free Address to Protestant Dissenters, as Such. Birmingham: Printed by Pearson and Rollason; for J.Johnson, 1788 (1.ed.1769).
- —. Letters to the Right Honourable Edmund Burke Occasioned by his Reflections on the Revolution in France. 3rd ed. Birmingham: Printed by T.Pearson; for J.Johnson, 1791.

Educational works:

- —. A Course of Lectures on Oratory and Criticism. Dublin: Printed for William Hallhead, 1781.

Philosophical and metaphysical works:

- —. A Letter to the Rev. Mr. John Palmer, in Defence of Philosophical Necessity. Bath: Printed by R.Cruttwell; for J.Johnson, 1779.
- —. A Second Letter to the Rev. Mr. John Palmer on Philosophical Necessity. London: Printed by H.Baldwin, for J.Johnson, 1780.
- —. A Letter to Jacob Bryant, Esq. in Defence of Philosophical Necessity. London: Printed by H.Baldwin, for J.Johnson, 1780.

Historical works:

- —. A Description of a New Chart of History. 6th ed. London: Printed for J.Johnson, 1786.
- —. Lectures on History, and General Policy. Dublin: Printed for P.Byrne, 1788.
- —. A General History of the Christian Church. Vol. 1 of 3. Northumberland: Printed by Andrew Kennedy, 1802.
- —. A General History of the Christian Church. Vol. 2 of 4. Northumberland: Printed by Andrew Kennedy, 1802.
- —. A General History of the Christian Church. Vol. 3 of 4. Northumberland: Printed by Andrew Kennedy, 1803.
- —. A General History of the Christian Church. Vol. 4 of 4. Northumberland: Printed by Andrew Kenney, 1803.

Scientific works:

- —. A Familiar Introduction to the Theory and Practice of Perspective. London: Printed for J.Johnson and J.Payne, 1770.
- —. Directions for Impregnating Water with Fixed Air. London: Printed for J.Johnson, 1772.
- —. Experiments and Observations on Different Kinds of Air, Vol.1. London, 1774.
- —. Experiments and Observations on Different Kinds of Air, Vol.2. London, 1775.
- —. Experiments and Observations relating to various Branches of Natural Philosophy, Vol.2. [Experiments and Observations on Different Kinds of Air, Vol.5]. Birmingham, 1781.
- —. Experiments and Observations on Different Kinds of Air. In 3 volumes, being the former 6 abridged and methodized, with many additions. Birmingham, 1790.
- —. Heads of Lectures on Course of Experimental Philosophy, particularly including Chemistry; delivered at the New College in Hackney.. London: Printed for J.Johnson, 1794.

Selected collected works:

- —. Scientific Correspondence of Joseph Priestley, Philadelphia: Collins Printing House, 1892.
- Dixon, Ronald A. Martineau, "Some letters of the Reverend Dr. Joseph Priestley, F. R. S.", J. Chem. Educ., March, 1933, 10 (3), p 149.
