= An History of the Corruptions of Christianity =

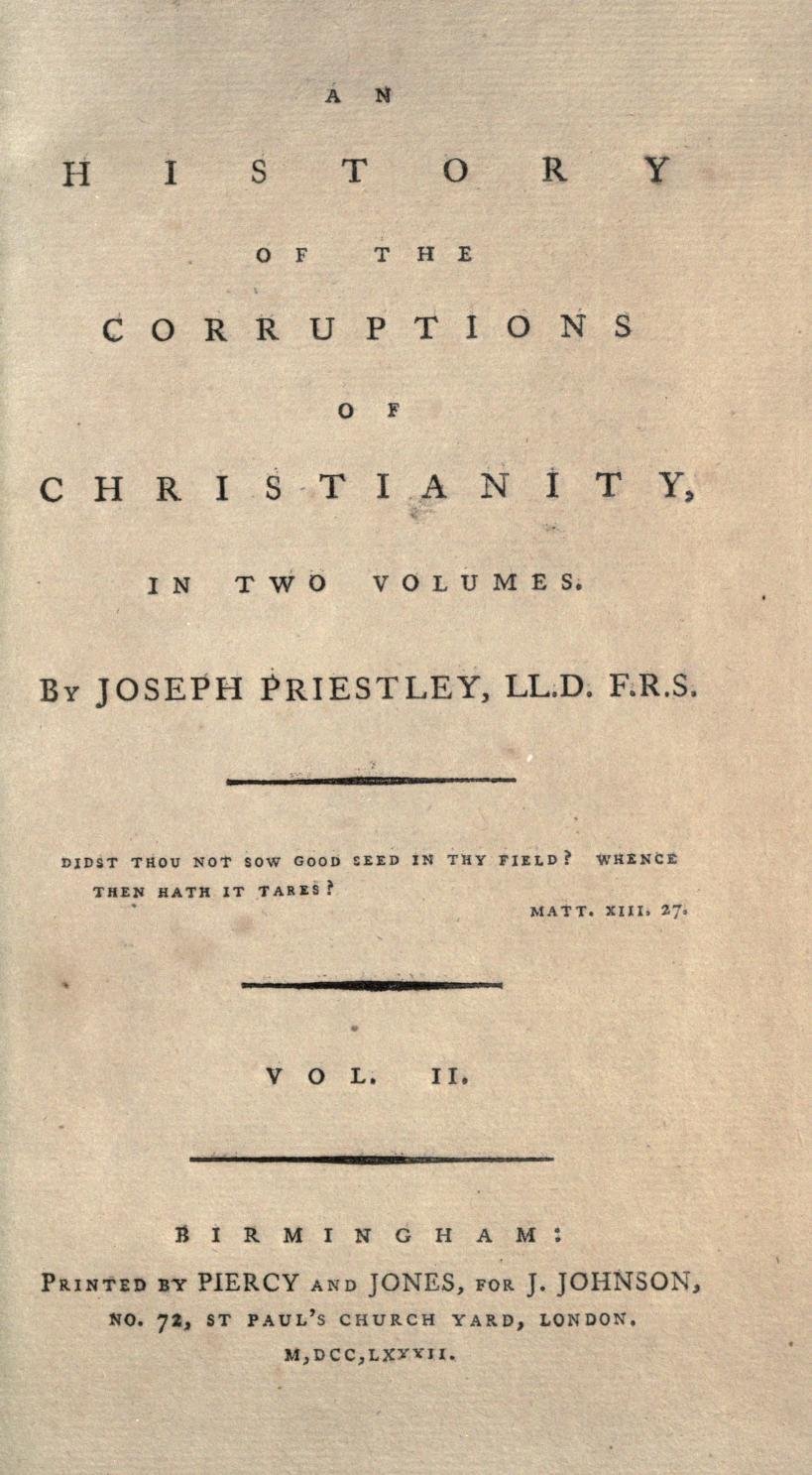
- Title page of the vol. II of An History of the Corruptions of Christianity
- Author: Joseph Priestley
- Language: English
- Published: 1782
- Publisher: Joseph Johnson

An History of the Corruptions of Christianity, published by Joseph Johnson in 1782, was the fourth part of 18th-century Dissenting minister Joseph Priestley's Institutes of Natural and Revealed Religion (1772–74).

== Summary ==
Priestley's major argument in the Institutes is that the only revealed religious truths that can be accepted are those that also conform to the truths of the natural world. Because his views of religion were deeply tied to his understanding of nature, the text's theism rests on the argument from design. Many of Priestley's arguments descended from 18th-century deism and comparative religion. The Institutes shocked and appalled many readers, primarily because it challenged basic Christian orthodoxies, such as the divinity of Christ and the miracle of the Virgin Birth. Priestley wanted to return Christianity to its "primitive" or "pure" form by eliminating the "corruptions" which had accumulated over the centuries. The fourth part of the Institutes, An History of the Corruptions of Christianity, became so long that he was forced to issue it separately. Priestley believed that the Corruptions was "the most valuable" work he ever published.

== Reception ==
Robert Schofield, Priestley's major modern biographer, describes the work as "derivative, disorganized, wordy, and repetitive, detailed, exhaustive, and devastatingly argued." The text addresses issues from the divinity of Christ to the proper form for the Lord's Supper. Thomas Jefferson would later write of the profound effect that Corruptions had on him: "I have read his Corruptions of Christianity, and Early Opinions of Jesus, over and over again; and I rest on them... as the basis of my own faith. These writings have never been answered." Although a few readers such as Jefferson approved of the work, it was generally harshly reviewed because of its theological positions, particularly its rejection of the Trinity.

== Bibliography ==
- Gibbs, F. W. Joseph Priestley: Adventurer in Science and Champion of Truth. London: Thomas Nelson and Sons, 1965.
- Holt, Anne. A Life of Joseph Priestley. London: Oxford University Press, 1931.
- Jackson, Joe, A World on Fire: A Heretic, An Aristocrat And The Race to Discover Oxygen. New York: Viking, 2005. ISBN 0-670-03434-7.
- McLachlan, John. "Joseph Priestley and the Study of History." Transactions of the Unitarian Historical Society 19 (1987–90): 252–63.
- Schofield, Robert E. The Enlightenment of Joseph Priestley: A Study of his Life and Work from 1733 to 1773. University Park: Pennsylvania State University Press, 1997. ISBN 0-271-01662-0.
- Schofield, Robert E. The Enlightened Joseph Priestley: A Study of His Life and Work from 1773 to 1804. University Park: Pennsylvania State University Press, 2004. ISBN 0-271-02459-3.
- Tapper, Alan. "Joseph Priestley." Dictionary of Literary Biography 252: British Philosophers 1500–1799. Eds. Philip B. Dematteis and Peter S. Fosl. Detroit: Gale Group, 2002.
- Thorpe, T.E. Joseph Priestley. London: J. M. Dent, 1906.
- Uglow, Jenny. The Lunar Men: Five Friends Whose Curiosity Changed the World. New York: Farrar, Straus and Giroux, 2002. ISBN 0-374-19440-8.
