= Letters to a Philosophical Unbeliever =

Book by Joseph Priestley

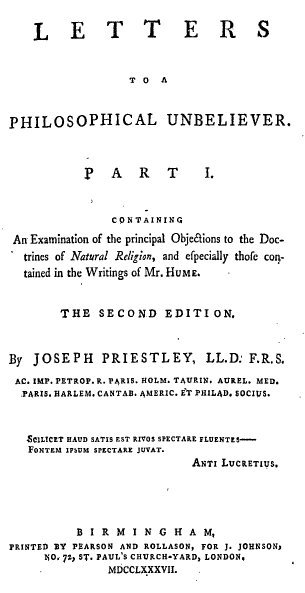
Title page from Joseph Priestley's Letters

Letters to a Philosophical Unbeliever (1780) is a multi-volume series of books on metaphysics by eighteenth-century British polymath Joseph Priestley.

Priestley wrote a series of important metaphysics works during the years he spent serving as Lord Shelburne's assistant and companion. In a set of five works written during this time he argued for a materialist philosophy, even though such a position "entailed denial of free will and the soul."

As Shelburne's companion, Priestley had accompanied him on a tour of Europe in 1774; they spent quite a bit of time in Paris and the unsettling conversations Priestley had with the French philosophes there prompted him to write Letters to a Philosophical Unbeliever, the last of his series of major metaphysical works. Priestley recalled the trip in his Memoirs:

As I chose on all occasions to appear as a Christian, I was told by some of them [philosophes], that I was the only person they had ever met with, of whose understanding they had any opinion, who professed to believe Christianity. But on interrogating them on the subject, I soon found that they had given no proper attention to it, and did not really know what Christianity was ... Having conversed so much with unbelievers at home and abroad, I thought I should be able to combat their prejudices with some advantage, and with this view I wrote ... the first part of my ‘Letters to a Philosophical Unbeliever’, in proof of the doctrines of a God and a providence, and ... a second part, in defence of the evidences [sic] of Christianity.

In Letters, he continued to defend his thesis, begun in Disquisitions relating to Matter and Spirit and The Doctrine of Philosophical Necessity Illustrated, that materialism and determinism can be reconciled with a belief in God. The text addresses those whose faith is shaped by books and fashion; Priestley draws an analogy between the skepticism of educated men and the credulity of the masses. He again argues for the existence of God using what Schofield calls "the classic argument from design ... leading from the necessary existence of a creator-designer to his self-comprehension, eternal existence, infinite power, omnipresence, and boundless benevolence."

In the three volumes, Priestley discusses, among many other works, Baron d'Holbach's Système de la Nature. He claimed that d'Holbach's "energy of nature," though it lacked intelligence or purpose, was really a description of God. Priestley believed that David Hume's style in the Dialogues Concerning Natural Religion (1779) was just as dangerous as its ideas; he feared the open-endedness of the Humean dialogue.

== Bibliography ==
- Holt, Anne. A Life of Joseph Priestley. London: Oxford University Press, 1931.
- Lindsay, Jack, ed. Autobiography of Joseph Priestley. Teaneck: Fairleigh Dickinson University Press, 1970. ISBN 978-0-8386-7831-2.
- Schofield, Robert E. The Enlightened Joseph Priestley: A Study of His Life and Work from 1773 to 1804. University Park: Pennsylvania State University Press, 2004. ISBN 0-271-02459-3.
- Tapper, Alan. "Joseph Priestley." Dictionary of Literary Biography 252: British Philosophers 1500–1799. Eds. Philip B. Dematteis and Peter S. Fosl. Detroit: Gale Group, 2002.
