= Institutes of Natural and Revealed Religion =

Three-volume work designed for religious education by Joseph Priestley

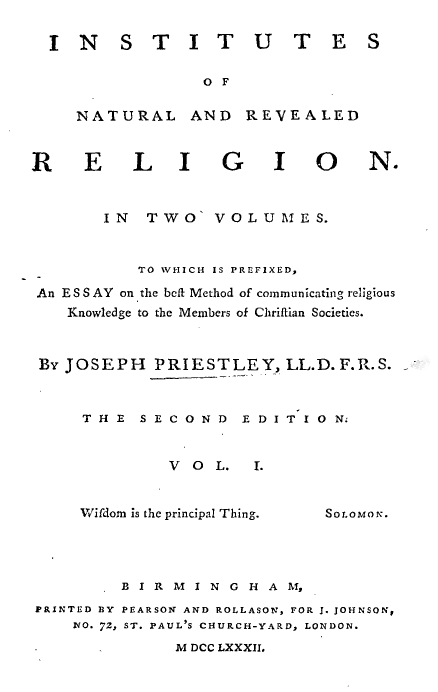
- Title page from Vol, 1, 2nd edition
- Author: Joseph Priestley
- Language: English
- Publisher: Joseph Johnson, London
- Publication date: 1772–1774
- Publication place: England

The Institutes of Natural and Revealed Religion, written by 18th-century English Dissenting minister and polymath Joseph Priestley, is a three-volume work designed for religious education published by Joseph Johnson between 1772 and 1774. Its central argument is that revelation and natural law must coincide.

== Overview ==
The Institutes, published as part of a series of works on religious education, was "a summary of a half-century of the writing of liberal theologians on a number of issues and was to become a standard exposition of beliefs for generations of Unitarians." Priestley's major argument is that only revealed religious truths which conform to the truth of the natural world should be accepted. Because his views of religion were deeply tied to his understanding of nature, the text's theism rests on the argument from design. Many of Priestley's arguments descended from 18th-century deism and comparative religion. Priestley wanted to return Christianity to its "primitive" or "pure" form by eliminating the "corruptions" which had accumulated over the centuries. The fourth part of the Institutes, The Corruptions of Christianity, became so long that he was forced to issue it separately. Priestley believed that the Corruptions was "the most valuable" work he ever published.

== History ==
Priestley began writing the Institutes in the 1760s, when he was a student at Daventry, one of the dissenting academies. While there, he had imbibed the pedagogical principles of its founder, Philip Doddridge; although he was dead, Doddridge's emphasis on academic rigour and freedom of thought lived on at the school and impressed Priestley. The ideals would always be a part of Priestley's educational programs. However, researching and writing the work eventually convinced Priestley to abandon the Calvinism of his youth and adopt Socinianism.

Priestley did not publish the Institutes until 1772, when he was at Leeds. In an effort to increase and stabilise membership at his church there, he taught three religious education classes, all outlined in his text. He subdivided the young people of the congregation into three categories: young men from 18 to 30 to whom he taught "the elements of natural and revealed religion" (young women may or may not be included in this group), children under 14 to whom he taught "the first elements of religious knowledge by way of a short catechism in the plainest and most familiar language possible"; and "an intermediate class" to whom he taught "knowledge of the Scriptures only".

Unlike the later Sunday schools established by Robert Raikes, Priestley aimed his classes at middle-class Rational Dissenters; he wanted to teach them "the principles of natural religion and the evidences and doctrine of revelation in a regular and systematic course", something that their parents could not provide.

Priestley wrote texts for the courses that he envisioned: A Catechism for Children and Young Persons (1767) went through eleven English-language editions and A Scripture Catechism, consisting of a Series of Questions, with References to the Scriptures instead of Answers (1772), which went through six British editions by 1817. He aimed to write non-sectarian Catechisms but failed. He offended many orthodox readers by focusing on God's benevolence instead of on Adam's sin and Christ's atonement. Priestley implemented this same system of religious instruction over a decade later in Birmingham, when he became a minister at New Meeting.

== Reaction ==
The Institutes shocked and appalled many readers, primarily because it challenged basic Christian orthodoxies, such as the divinity of Christ and the miracle of the Virgin Birth. Methodists in Leeds penned a hymn asking God to:

The Unitarian fiend expel
And chase his doctrine back to Hell.

In demanding that his readers apply the logic of the emerging sciences and comparative history to the Bible and Christianity, Priestley alienated religious and scientific readers alike: scientific readers did not appreciate seeing science used in the defence of religion, and religious readers dismissed the application of science to religion.

== Bibliography ==
- Gibbs, F. W. Joseph Priestley: Adventurer in Science and Champion of Truth. London: Thomas Nelson and Sons, 1965.
- Holt, Anne. A Life of Joseph Priestley. London: Oxford University Press, 1931.
- Jackson, Joe, A World on Fire: A Heretic, An Aristocrat and the Race to Discover Oxygen. New York: Viking, 2005. ISBN 0-670-03434-7.
- McLachlan, John. "Joseph Priestley and the Study of History." Transactions of the Unitarian Historical Society 19 (1987–90): 252–63.
- Schofield, Robert E. The Enlightenment of Joseph Priestley: A Study of his Life and Work from 1733 to 1773. University Park: Pennsylvania State University Press, 1997. ISBN 0-271-01662-0.
- Tapper, Alan. "Joseph Priestley." Dictionary of Literary Biography 252: British Philosophers 1500–1799. Eds. Philip B. Dematteis and Peter S. Fosl. Detroit: Gale Group, 2002.
- Uglow, Jenny. The Lunar Men: Five Friends Whose Curiosity Changed the World. New York: Farrar, Straus and Giroux, 2002. ISBN 0-374-19440-8.
- Watts, R. "Joseph Priestley and education." Enlightenment and Dissent 2 (1983): 83–100.
