= Disquisitions Relating to Matter and Spirit =

1777 book by Joseph Priestley

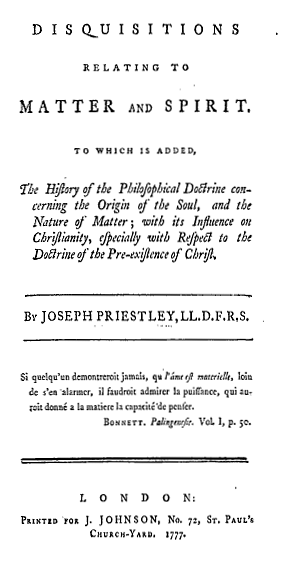
Title page from the first edition of Disquisitions relating to Matter and Spirit (1777)

Disquisitions relating to Matter and Spirit (1777) is a major work of metaphysics written by eighteenth-century British polymath Joseph Priestley and published by Joseph Johnson.

Between 1774 and 1778, while he was serving as an assistant to Lord Shelburne, Priestley wrote five major metaphysical works, in which he outlined his materialist philosophy, even though such a position "entailed denial of free will and the soul."

In the first of these works, The Examination of Dr. Reid's Inquiry. . . Dr. Beattie's Essay. . . and Dr. Oswald's Appeal (1774), Priestley had strongly suggested that there was no mind-body duality. Such a position shocked and angered many of his readers who believed that such a duality was necessary for the soul to exist. In order to explain his belief more clearly Priestley wrote the Disquisitions, which claimed that both "matter" and "force" are active, and therefore that objects in the world and the mind must be made of the same substance. Moreover, he contended that discussing the soul was impossible because it is made of a divine substance, and humanity cannot access the divine. He therefore denied the materialism of the soul, while simultaneously claiming its existence. Although he buttressed his arguments with familiar scholarship and ancient authorities, including scripture, he was labeled an atheist and at least a dozen hostile refutations of the work were published by 1782.

== Bibliography ==
- Gibbs, F. W. Joseph Priestley: Adventurer in Science and Champion of Truth. London: Thomas Nelson and Sons, 1965.
- Holt, Anne. A Life of Joseph Priestley. London: Oxford University Press, 1931.
- Schofield, Robert E. The Enlightened Joseph Priestley: A Study of His Life and Work from 1773 to 1804. University Park: Pennsylvania State University Press, 2004. ISBN 0-271-02459-3.
- Tapper, Alan. "Joseph Priestley." Dictionary of Literary Biography 252: British Philosophers 1500–1799. Eds. Philip B. Dematteis and Peter S. Fosl. Detroit: Gale Group, 2002.
