= Free association (psychology) =

Technique used in psychoanalysis

- MeSH: D005608

Free association is the expression (as by speaking or writing) of the content of consciousness without censorship as an aid in gaining access to unconscious processes. The technique is used in psychoanalysis (and also in psychodynamic theory) which was originally devised by Sigmund Freud out of the hypnotic method of his mentor and colleague, Josef Breuer.

Freud described it as such: "The importance of free association is that the patients spoke for themselves, rather than repeating the ideas of the analyst; they work through their own material, rather than parroting another's suggestions."

== Origins ==
Freud developed the technique as an alternative to hypnosis, because he perceived the latter as subjected to more fallibility, and because patients could recover and comprehend crucial memories while fully conscious. However, Freud felt that despite a subject's effort to remember, a certain resistance kept him or her from the most painful and important memories. He eventually came to the view that certain items were completely repressed, cordoned off and relegated only to the unconscious realm of the mind. The new technique was also encouraged by his experiences with "Miss Elisabeth", one of his early clients who protested against interruptions of her flow of thought, that was described by his official biographer Ernest Jones as "one of the countless examples of a patient's furthering the physician's work".

"There can be no exact date for the discovery of the 'free association' method... it developed very gradually between 1892 and 1895, becoming steadily refined and purified from the adjutants - hypnosis, suggestion, pressing, and questioning - that accompanied it at its inception".

Subsequently, in The Interpretation of Dreams, Freud cites as a precursor of free association a letter from Schiller, the letter maintaining that, "where there is a creative mind, Reason - so it seems to me - relaxes its watch upon the gates, and the ideas rush in pell-mell". Freud would later also mention as a possible influence an essay by Ludwig Börne, suggesting that to foster creativity "you write down, without any falsification or hypocrisy, everything that comes into your head".

Other potential influences in the development of this technique include Husserl's version of epoche and the work of Sir Francis Galton. It has been argued that Galton is the progenitor of free association, and that Freud adopted the technique from Galton's reports published in the journal Brain, of which Freud was a subscriber. Free association also shares some features with the idea of stream of consciousness, employed by writers such as Virginia Woolf and Marcel Proust: "all stream-of-consciousness fiction is greatly dependent on the principles of free association".

Freud called free association "this fundamental technical rule of analysis... We instruct the patient to put himself into a state of quiet, unreflecting self-observation, and to report to us whatever internal observations he is able to make" - taking care not to "exclude any of them, whether on the ground that it is too disagreeable or too indiscreet to say, or that it is too unimportant or irrelevant, or that it is nonsensical and need not be said".

The psychoanalyst James Strachey (1887-1967) considered free association as 'the first instrument for the scientific examination of the human mind'.

== Characteristics ==
In free association, psychoanalytic patients are invited to relate whatever comes into their minds during the analytic session, and not to censor their thoughts. This technique is intended to help the patient learn more about what he or she thinks and feels, in an atmosphere of non-judgmental curiosity and acceptance. Psychoanalysis assumes that people are often conflicted between their need to learn about themselves, and their (conscious or unconscious) fears of and defenses against change and self-exposure. The method of free association has no linear or preplanned agenda, but works by intuitive leaps and linkages which may lead to new personal insights and meanings: "the logic of association is a form of unconscious thinking".

When used in this spirit, free association is a technique in which neither therapist nor patient knows in advance exactly where the conversation will lead, but it tends to lead to material that matters very much to the patient. "In spite of the seeming confusion and lack of connection...meanings and connections begin to appear out of the disordered skein of thoughts...some central themes".

The goal of free association is not to unearth specific answers or memories, but to instigate a journey of co-discovery which can enhance the patient's integration of thought, feeling, agency, and selfhood.

Free association is contrasted with Freud's "fundamental rule" of psychoanalysis. Whereas free association is one of many techniques (along with dream interpretation and analysis of parapraxis), the fundamental rule is a pledge undertaken by the client. Freud used the following analogy to describe free association to his clients: "Act as though, for instance, you were a traveler sitting next to the window of a railway carriage and describing to someone inside the carriage the changing views which you see outside." The fundamental rule is something the client agrees to at the beginning of analysis, and it is an underlying oath that is intended to continue throughout analysis: the client must promise to be honest in every respect. The pledge to the fundamental rule was articulated by Freud: "Finally, never forget that you have promised to be absolutely honest, and never leave anything out because, for some reason or other, it is unpleasant to tell it."

== Freudian approach ==
Freud's eventual practice of psychoanalysis focused not so much on the recall of these memories as on the internal mental conflicts which kept them buried deep within the mind. However, the technique of free association still plays a role today in therapeutic practice and in the study of the mind.

The use of free association was intended to help discover notions that a patient had developed, initially, at an unconscious level, including:

- Transference - unwittingly transferring feelings about one person to become applied to another person
- Projection - projecting internal feelings or motives, instead ascribing them to other things or people
- Resistance - holding a mental block against remembering or accepting some events or ideas

The mental conflicts were analyzed from the viewpoint that the patients, initially, did not understand how such feelings were occurring at a subconscious level, hidden inside their minds. "It is free association within language that is the key to representing the prohibited and forbidden desire...to access unconscious affective memory".

== Further developments ==
=== Jung ===
Jung and his Zurich colleagues 'devised some ingenious association tests which confirmed Freud's conclusions about the way in which emotional factors may interfere with recollection': they were published in 1906. As Freud himself put it, 'in this manner Bleuler and Jung built the first bridge from experimental psychology to psychoanalysis'.

=== Ferenczi ===
Freud, at least initially, saw free association as a relatively accessible method for patients. Ferenczi disagreed, with the famous aphorism: "The patient is not cured by free-associating, he is cured when he can free-associate".

=== Lacan ===
Lacan took up the point. "Free association is really a labour - so much so that some have gone so far as to say that it requires an apprenticeship, even to the point of seeing in such an apprenticeship its true formative value".

=== 20th century ===
By the late twentieth century, "analysts today don't expect the free-association process to take hold until well into the analysis; in fact, some regard the appearance of true free association as a signal to terminate the analysis".

As time went on, other psychologists created tests that exemplified Freud's idea of free association including Rorschach's Inkblot Test and The Thematic Apperception Test (TAT) by Christina Morgan and Henry of Harvard University. Although Rorschach's test has been met with significant criticism over the years, the TAT is still used today, especially with children.

Robert Langs helped to bring Freud's earliest work back to the forefront, which depended on free association and insight rather than decoding by the psychotherapist.

== Criticism ==
As object relations theory came to place more emphasis on the patient/analyst relationship, and less on the reconstruction of the past, so too did the criticism emerge that Freud never quite freed himself from some use of pressure. For example, "he still advocated the 'fundamental rule' of free association...[which] could have the effect of bullying the patient, as if to say: 'If you do not associate freely - we have ways of making you'."

A further problem may be that, "through overproduction, the freedom it offers sometimes becomes a form of resistance to any form of interpretation".

Some studies suggest a lack of relevance or validity of this method.

== Coda ==
Adam Phillips suggests that "the radical nature of Freud's project is clear if one imagines what it would be like to live in a world in which everyone was able - had the capacity - to free-associate, to say whatever came into their mind at any given moment...like a collage".

== See also ==
- Association of ideas
- Associationism
- Epoche
- Internal monologue
- Stream of consciousness writing
- Stream of consciousness
- Structuralism
