= Critic =

Person who offers reasoned judgment

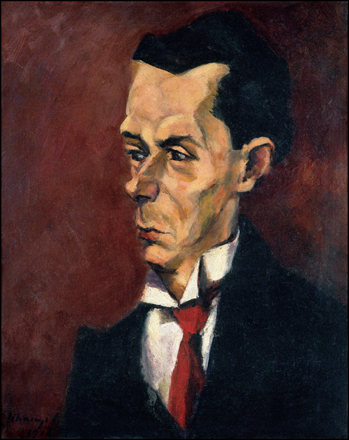
Critic by Lajos Tihanyi. Oil on canvas, c. 1916.

A critic is a person who communicates an assessment and an opinion of various forms of creative works such as art, literature, engineering, and taste. Critics may also take as their subject social or government policy. Critical judgments, whether derived from critical thinking or not, weigh up a range of factors, including an assessment of the extent to which the item under review achieves its purpose and its creator's intention and a knowledge of its context. They may also include a positive or negative personal response.

Characteristics of a good critic are articulateness, preferably having the ability to use language with a high level of appeal and skill. Sympathy, sensitivity and insight are also important. Form, style and medium are all considered by the critic. In architecture and food criticism, the item's function, value and cost may be added components.

Critics are publicly accepted and, to a significant degree, followed because of the quality of their assessments or their reputation. Influential critics of art, music, theater and architecture often present their arguments in complete books. One very famous example is John Ruskin's Seven Lamps of Architecture and The Stones of Venice. Critics may base their assessment on a range of theoretical positions. For instance, they may take a feminist or Freudian perspective.

Unlike other individuals who may editorialize on subjects via websites or letters written to publications, professional critics are paid to produce their assessment and opinions for print, radio, magazine, television, or Internet companies. When their personal opinion outweighs considered judgment, people who give opinions, whether on current events, public affairs, sports, media or art are often referred to as "pundits" instead of critics.

Critics are themselves subject to competing critics, since the final critical judgment always entails subjectivity. An established critic can play a powerful role as a public arbiter of taste or opinion. Also, critics or a coordinated group of critics, may award symbols of recognition.

== Derivation ==
The word "critic" comes from Greek κριτικός (kritikós) 'able to discern', which is a Greek derivation of the word κριτής (krités), meaning a person who offers reasoned judgment or analysis, value judgment, interpretation or observation. Early English meaning of criticism was based mainly on the criticism of literature and it was in the 17th century that more general forms of criticism began.

== Characteristics ==
Characteristics of a good critic include articulateness, preferably having the ability to use language with a high level of appeal and skill. Sympathy, sensitivity, and insight are also important factors.

Critics have themselves commented on the characteristics of a good critic. The cultural critic Clement Greenberg wrote that a good critic excels through "insights into the evidence ... and by ... loyalty to the relevant", while poet and critic T. S. Eliot wrote that "a critic must have a very highly developed sense of fact".

In 1971, Harold C. Schonberg, chief music critic of The New York Times from 1960 to 1980, said that he wrote for himself, "not necessarily for readers, not for musicians. ... It's not a critic's job to be right or wrong; it's his job to express an opinion in readable English." Schonberg was the first music critic to receive the Pulitzer Prize for criticism.

Daniel Mendelsohn described the equation of criticism for critics as knowledge + taste = meaningful judgement.

Restaurant critic Terry Durack explained that from a critic "you hope for a thorough, objective and legitimate discussion" that puts "opera, art or book into context, so that it adds to your own body of knowledge"; in the context of a restaurant criticism, this means it is "not about me liking it or not; it's about me helping you decide whether you are going to like it or not."

Rothko's dilemma was that he wanted to employ the vocabulary of symbolism – the palpitating indeterminate space, the excruciatingly refined colour, the obsession with nuance, the presence of Mallarmé's "negated object" – to render the patriarchal despair and elevation of the Old Testament. Criticism doesn't get sharper, or more sensitive, or more deeply sympathetic to the object, than that.

Robert Hughes (critic) on (artist) Mark Rothko

== Social and political critics ==
Social and political critics have used various forms of art to express their criticism, including literature and music. Pierre Beaumarchais, for example, prior to the French Revolution, used his play The Marriage of Figaro to denounce aristocratic privilege, and a critic's influence is enhanced by subsequent reworkings such as the operatic versions of Beaumarchais's play (The Barber of Seville) by Rossini and (The Marriage of Figaro) by Mozart. August Ahlqvist, a Finnish professor and poet, who highly admired J. L. Runeberg, the national poet of Finland, gave very negative feedback to the entire literary production of the author Aleksis Kivi, when Kivi presented content of the peoples social life in the form of rude realism instead of romanticism. Among the most famous social/political criticism in literary form are Jonathan Swift's satire Gulliver's Travels and George Orwell's satire Animal Farm. Some political critics, such as Ai Weiwei use visual art as their medium. Throughout history, political critics have faced higher risks, including the risk of imprisonment or death.

== Online critics ==
Several websites have developed for the purpose of compiling or publishing original critical reviews. Examples include Blogcritics, Rotten Tomatoes, and Yelp. According to A. O. Scott, chief film critic for The New York Times, everyone on the Internet is a critic. Some critics like Roger Ebert achieve iconic status in pop culture and become well regarded.

== Cinematography and television ==
The American film critics Roger Ebert and Gene Siskel collaborated and appeared on television sometimes agreeing on their review of cinematographic works; sometimes they would differ.

Film critics may use star classification to qualify the reviewed works.

Characters depicting critics have been part of some movies, and have been represented in comedies, such as a food critic in the animated fantasy-comedy Ratatouille, and as an art critic in one of the initial parts of the anthology comedy film History of the World, Part I.

== Responses to critics ==
People whose work is the subject of criticism have a full range of responses to it. For example, they may be appreciative, offended, distressed, encouraged, amused or nonplussed.

We do not object to criticism; and we do not expect that the critic will read the book before writing a notice of it. We do not even expect the reviewer of the book will say that he has not read it. No we have no anticipations of anything unusual in this age of criticism.

— Satirical comment about potential criticism by Mark Twain and Charles Dudley Warner in their Preface to the American Edition of their co-authored novel The Gilded Age: A Tale of Today.

== See also ==
- Analysis
- Art criticism
- Art historian
- Censorship
- Complaint
- Connoisseur
- Constructive criticism
- Critical philosophy
- Critical theory
- Critical thinking
- Critique of political economy
- Critique of work
- Critique
- Cultural critic
- Film criticism
- Food critic
- Frankfurt School of social theory
- List of chief music critics
- Literary criticism
- Music journalism
- Polemic
- Review
- Social criticism
- Textual criticism
- Theatre criticism
- Video game criticism
- Wine critic
