= The Stones of Venice =

The Stones of Venice may refer to:

- The Stones of Venice (book), an 1851 treatise on Venetian art and architecture by John Ruskin
- The Stones of Venice (audio drama), a 2001 Doctor Who audio play
