= Association (psychology) =

Mental connection between ideas or mental states

Association in psychology refers to a mental connection between concepts, events, or mental states that usually stems from specific experiences. Associations are seen throughout several schools of thought in psychology, including behaviorism, associationism, psychoanalysis, social psychology, and structuralism. The idea stems from Plato and Aristotle, especially about the succession of memories, and it was carried on by philosophers such as John Locke, David Hume, David Hartley, and James Mill. It finds its place in modern psychology in such areas as memory, learning, and the study of neural pathways.

== Learned associations ==
Associative learning is when a subject creates a relationship between stimuli (e.g., auditory or visual) or behavior and the original stimulus. The higher the concreteness of stimulus items, the more likely they are to evoke sensory images that can function as mediators of associative learning and memory. The ability to learn new information is essential to daily life and thus a critical component of healthy aging. There is substantial research documenting an aging-related decline in forming and retrieving episodic memories. The acquisition of associations is the basis for learning. This learning is seen in classical and operant conditioning.

=== Law of Effect ===
Edward Thorndike did research in this area and developed the law of effect, where associations between a stimulus and response are affected by the consequence of the response. For example, behaviors increase in strength and/or frequency when they have been followed by reward. This occurs because of an association between the behavior and a mental representation of the reward (such as food). Conversely, receiving a negative consequence lowers the frequency of the behavior due to the negative association. An example of this would be a rat in a cage with a bar lever. If pressing the lever results in a food pellet, the rat will learn to press the lever to receive food. If pressing the lever resulted in an electric shock on the floor of the cage, the rat would learn to avoid pressing the lever.

=== Classical conditioning ===
Classical conditioning is an example of a learned association. The classical conditioning process consists of four elements: unconditioned stimulus (UCS), unconditioned response (UCR), conditioned stimulus (CS), and conditioned response (CR).

Without conditioning, there is already a relationship between the unconditioned stimulus and the unconditioned response. When a second stimulus is paired with the unconditioned stimulus, the response becomes associated with both stimuli. The secondary stimulus is known as the conditioned stimulus and elicits a conditioned response.

The strength of the response to the conditioned stimulus increases over the period of learning, as the CS becomes associated with UCS. The strength of the response can diminish if CS is presented without UCS. In his famous experiment, Pavlov used the unconditioned response of dogs salivating at the sight of food (UCS), and paired the sound of a bell (CS) with receiving food, and later the dog salivated (CR) to the bell alone, indicating that an association had been established between the bell and food.

=== Operant conditioning ===
In operant conditioning, behaviors are changed due to the experienced outcomes of those behaviors. Stimuli do not cause behavior, as in classical conditioning, but instead the associations are created between stimulus and consequence, as an extension by Thorndike on his Law of Effect.

B.F. Skinner was well known for his studies of reinforcers on behavior. His studies included the aspect of contingency, which refers to the connection between a specific action and the following consequence or reinforcement. Skinner described three contingencies: positive reinforcement, negative reinforcement, and punishment. Reinforcements create a positive association between the action and consequence in order to promote the continuation of the action. This is done in one of two ways: positive reinforcers introduce a rewarding stimulus, whereas negative reinforcers remove an aversive stimulus to make the environment less aversive. Punishments create a negative relationship between the action and the consequence so that the action does not continue.

=== Mood ===
The overall content of moods, compared to emotions, feelings or affects, are less specific and are likely to be provoked by a stimulus or event. The present studies investigated the constituents of the occurrent experience of specific moods like sad or angry mood states. Moods are typically defined by contrasting them with emotions. Several criteria exist for distinguishing moods from emotions, but there is a widely shared consensus that the core differentiating feature is that moods, in contrast to emotions, are diffuse and global. Watson introduced a white fluffy rabbit to an infant, and created a connection between the rabbit and a loud noise. This experience for Little Albert associated a feeling of fear with the rabbit.

=== Acquired equivalence ===
Acquired equivalence is defined as a learning and generalization paradigm in which prior training in stimulus equivalence increases the amount of generalization between two stimuli, even if they are superficially dissimilar. Therefore, if two different stimuli share the same consequence, they predict the same outcome. Let us suppose that there are two girls, Anna and Sarah, who have nothing in common other than that they both love pets. When you learn that Sarah has a dog, you immediately predict that Anna will love Sarah's dog. The area in the brain responsible for the acquired equivalence is the hippocampus; hence, in cases when the hippocampal region is damaged, there are deficits of acquired equivalence. In acquired equivalence, the stimuli are not categorized based on their characteristics (physical, emotional) but based on their functional characteristic (preference for the same thing). During this paradigm, it is learned to create compositions from different categories, and for this reason, some researchers agree that acquired equivalence can be a synonym for categorization. Both humans and non-humans have the ability for acquired equivalence.

An example of acquired equivalence is from the studies Geoffrey Hall and his colleagues have conducted with pigeons. In one study, the pigeons were trained to peck when they saw the light with different colors. After that, the researchers paired certain colors to appear in sequence and provided food when the pigeons pecked only in a few sequences. Thus, the pigeons learned that in those sequences, if they peck, they will certainly receive food. Those sequences had something special that the pigeons could also learn; certain two colors were followed by food when they were followed by certain one color, so the two colors were somewhat equivalent. Let us assume, as there were six colors, that red and green, when followed by only yellow, led to food. Similarly, blue and brown, when followed by only white, also led to food. In this way, the pigeons learned that red is in a way equivalent to green, and blue to brown, because they are paired with the same color.

The next step was to teach the pigeons that pecking on red alone leads to food, while pecking to blue alone does not. At this point, the researchers presented the pigeons with the second colors (i.e., green and brown) that were paired with the same color (i.e., yellow or white) with which the first colors were also paired (i.e., red and blue), which made the colors with the same pairing color (i.e., red and green as pairing with yellow and blue and brown as pairing with white) equivalent in the pigeons' eyes. So, at this third step, the pigeons were presented with the green light and after that with the brown light, and to the researchers' surprise, the pigeons showed a quick response with a strong pecking to the first color while not responding to the second. This result shows that the pigeons have learned the equivalence of two colors from their co-occurring and their having similar consequence in one occurrence. This idea of equivalence showed its effect when the pigeons were in a totally different context and saw one of the two colors leading to a certain consequence; they believed that the other color would also lead to the same consequence, as it is equivalent to the first. The pigeons learned to generalize from one color to another because of their history of co-occurring.

== Memory ==
Memory seems to operate as a sequence of associations: concepts, words, and opinions are intertwined, so that stimuli such as a person's face will call up the associated name. Understanding the effects of mood on memory is central to several issues in psychology. It is a primary topic in theories of the relation between affect and cognition. Mood's effect on memory may mediate the influence of mood on a variety of behaviors and judgments associated with decision making, helping, and person perception. Understanding the relationships between different items is fundamental to episodic memory, and damage to the hippocampal region of the brain has been found to hinder learning of associations between objects.

== Testing associations ==
Associations in humans can be measured with the Implicit Association Test, a psychological test which measures the implicit (subconscious) relation between two concepts, which was created by Anthony G. Greenwald in 1995. It has been used in investigations of subconscious racial bias, gender and sexual orientation bias, consumer preferences, political preferences, personality traits, alcohol and drug use, mental health, and relationships. The test measures the associations between different ideas, such as race and crime. Reaction time is used to distinguish associations; faster reaction time is an indicator of a stronger association. A D score is used to represent the participant's mean reaction time. If the participant's mean reaction time is negative, then that individual is thought to have less implicit bias. If the participant's mean reaction time is positive, then that individual is thought to have more implicit bias. A D score for each participant is calculated by deleting trials that are greater than 10,000 milliseconds, deleting participants who respond quicker than 300 milliseconds on over 10% of trials, determining inclusive standard deviations for all trials in Stages 3 and 4, and also in Stages 6 and 7. Mean response times are determined for Stages 3, 4, 6, and 7, the mean difference between Stage 6 and Stage 3 (Mean_{Stage6} - Mean_{Stage3}) will be computed as well as the mean difference between Stage 7 and Stage 4(Mean_{Stage7} - Mean_{Stage4}), each difference is divided by its associated inclusive standard deviation, and the D score is equivalent to the average of the two resulting ratios. In psychology, association can sometimes be synonymous with correlation. When something is referred to as having a positive association or positive correlation, it describes how high or low levels of one variable occur with high or low levels of another variable. Other common types of association are negative association, zero association, and curvilinear association.

== See also ==
- Association of Ideas
- Associative memory (psychology)
- Halo effect
- Pair by association

== Bibliography ==
- Boring, E. G. (1950) A History of Experimental Psychology. New York: Appleton-Century-Crofts.
- Crisp, R. J; Turner, R. N. (2007). "Attitude formation". Essential Social Psychology. London, Thousand Oaks, CA: SAGE. ISBN 978-0-7619-4215-3.
- Gallistel, C. R. & Gibbon, J. (2002). The Symbolic Foundations of Conditioned Behavior. Mahwah, NJ: L. Erlbaum Associates. ISBN 0-8058-2934-2
- Gazzaniga, M. S.; Ivry, R. B. & Mangun, G. R. (2009). "Learning and memory". Cognitive neuroscience: The biology of the mind. New York: W.W. Norton. ISBN 978-0-393-92795-5.
- Greenwald, A. G; McGhee, D. E.; Schwartz, J. L. K. (1998). "Measuring individual differences in implicit cognition: The implicit association test". Journal of Personality and Social Psychology. 74 (6): 1464–1480. doi:10.1037/0022-3514.74.6.1464. PMID 9654756. S2CID 7840819.
- Klein, Stephen (2012). Learning: Principles and Applications (6 ed.). Thousand Oaks, CA, London: SAGE. ISBN 978-1-4129-8734-9.
- Shettleworth, S. J. (2010) Cognition, Evolution and Behavior. Oxford, New York: Oxford University Press. ISBN 978-0-19-531984-2.
- Smith, E. E. & Kosslyn, S. M. (2007) "Cognitive Psychology: Mind and Brain", Upper Saddle River, NJ: Pearson / Prentice Hall. ISBN 978-0-13-182508-6.
- Stark, C. E. L; Bayley, P. J.; Squire, L. R. (2002). "Recognition memory for single items and for associations is similarly impaired following damage to the hippocampal region". Learning & Memory. 5 (9): 238–242. doi:10.1101/lm.51802. PMC 187132. PMID 12359833.
- Timberlake, W. (1994). "Behavior systems, associationism, and pavlovian conditioning". Psychonomic Bulletin & Review. 4 (1): 405–420. doi:10.3758/bf03210945. PMID 24203549.
- Watier, N.; Collin, C. (2012). "The effects of distinctiveness on memory and metamemory for face–name associations". Memory. 1 (20): 73–88. doi:10.1080/09658211.2011.637935. PMID 22171812. S2CID 43884542.
