= The Seven Lamps of Architecture =

Essay on architecture by John Ruskin (1849)

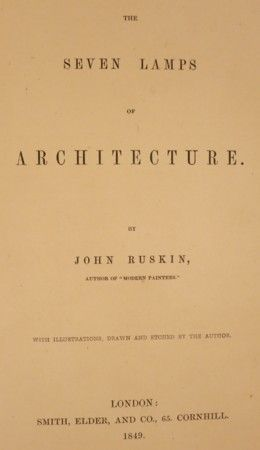
- Title page of the first edition
- Author: John Ruskin
- Illustrator: John Ruskin
- Language: English
- Subject: Architecture
- Genre: Non-fiction
- Publisher: Smith, Elder & Co.
- Publication date: May 1849
- Publication place: United Kingdom
- Media type: Print
- Pages: 205 pp.
- Followed by: The Stones of Venice

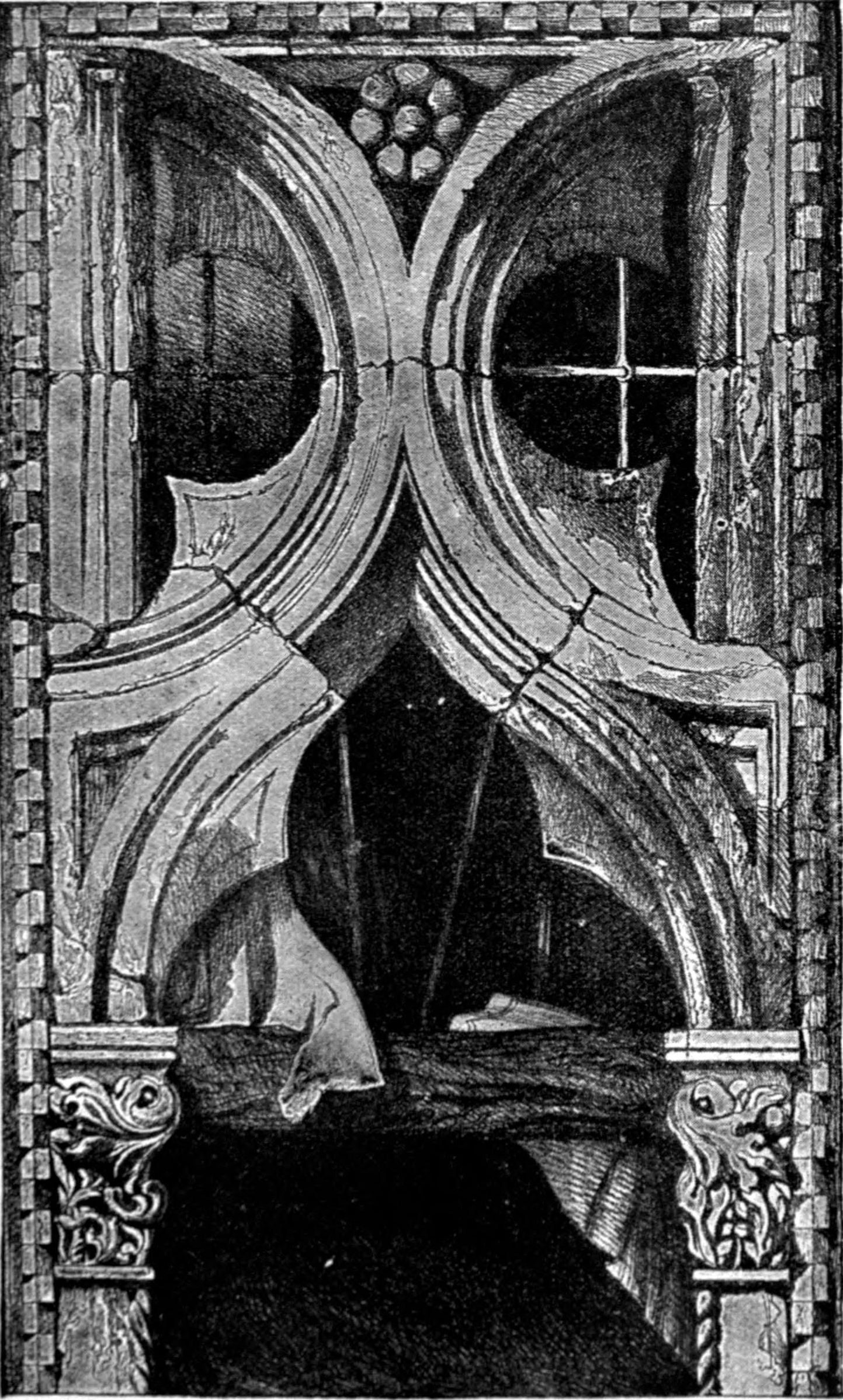
Plate VIII - Window from the Ca' Foscari, Venice. Ruskin was one of the first critics to employ photography to aid the accuracy of his illustrations.

The Seven Lamps of Architecture is an extended essay, first published in May 1849 and written by the English art critic and theorist John Ruskin. The 'lamps' of the title are Ruskin's principles of architecture, which he later expanded in the three-volume The Stones of Venice. To an extent, they codified some of the contemporary thinking behind the Gothic Revival. At the time of its publication, A. W. N. Pugin and others had already advanced the ideas of the Revival and it was well under way in practice. Ruskin offered little new to the debate, but the book helped to capture and summarise the thoughts of the movement. The Seven Lamps also proved a great popular success, and received the approval of the ecclesiologists typified by the Cambridge Camden Society, who criticised in their publication The Ecclesiologist lapses committed by modern architects in ecclesiastical commissions.

== The 'Lamps' ==
The essay was published in book form in May 1849 and is structured with eight chapters; an introduction and one chapter for each of the seven 'Lamps', which represent the demands that good architecture must meet, expressed as directions in which the association of ideas may take the observer:

1. Sacrifice – dedication of man's craft to God, as visible proofs of man's love and obedience
2. Truth – handcrafted and honest display of materials and structure. Truth to materials and honest display of construction were bywords since the serious Gothic Revival had distanced itself from the whimsical "Gothick" of the 18th century; it had been often elaborated by Pugin and others.
3. Power – buildings should be thought of in terms of their massing and reach towards the sublimity of nature by the action of the human mind upon them and the organization of physical effort in constructing buildings.
4. Beauty – aspiration towards God expressed in ornamentation drawn from nature, his creation
5. Life – buildings should be made by human hands, so that the joy of masons and stonecarvers is associated with the expressive freedom given them
6. Memory – buildings should respect the culture from which they have developed
7. Obedience – no originality for its own sake, but conforming to the finest among existing English values, in particular expressed through the "English Early Decorated" Gothic as the safest choice of style.

Writing within the essentially British tradition of the associational values that inform aesthetic appreciation, Ruskin argued from a moral stance with polemic tone, that the technical innovations of architecture since the Renaissance and particularly the Industrial Revolution, had subsumed its spiritual content and sapped its vitality. He also argued that no new style was needed to redress this problem, as the appropriate styles already existed. The 'truest' architecture was therefore the older Gothic of medieval cathedrals and Venice. The essay sketched out the principles which Ruskin later expounded upon in the three-volume The Stones of Venice published between 1851 and 1853. Practically, he suggested an 'honest' architecture with no veneers, finishes, hidden support nor machined mouldings and that beauty must be derived from nature and crafted by man.

Ruskin drew upon Archibald Alison's Essays on the Nature and Principles of Taste (1790–1810) for some of his principles, such as the requirement of leisured poise as the best state for appreciating beauty, the thought that the natural countryside is more conducive to producing an artist than the city, that the glory of architecture lies in its age. The Seven Lamps was reduced to the status of a "moral gloss on Alison" by George L. Hersey, in High Victorian Gothic.

He had an abiding confidence in the natural, untutored instinct for rightness and beauty in the average person: "all men have sense of what is right in this matter, if they would only use and apply this sense; every man knows where and how beauty gives him pleasure, if he would only ask for it when he does so, and not allow it to be forced upon him when he does not want it." Ruskin saw no beauty in well-designed tools: beauty is out of place where there is not serene leisure, or "if you thrust it into the places of toil. Put it in the drawing-room, not into the workshop; put it on domestic furniture, not upon tools of handicraft." For Ruskin, Beauty was not an inherent characteristic but a thing that could be applied to an object or withheld from it.

== Ruskin's choice of examples ==
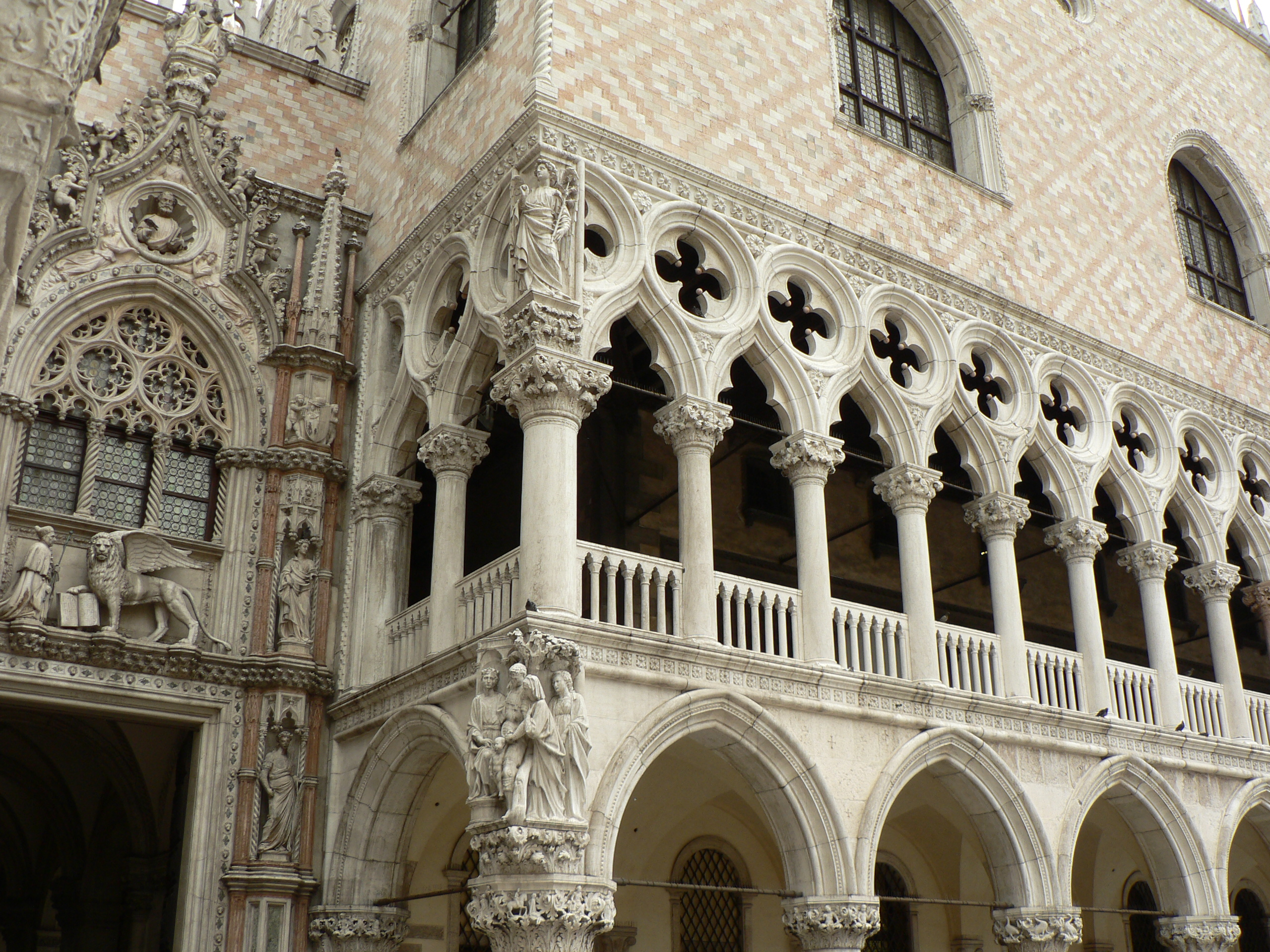
Polychrome brickwork and sculptural decoration in the Doge's Palace, Venice

Though Ruskin expressly disavowed any attempt to present an essay in the course of European architecture, he noted that "The reader will perhaps be surprised by the small number of buildings to which reference has been made." His nine pencil drawings that illustrate the principles he examines are all Tuscan and Venetian Romanesque and Gothic and northern French Gothic examples and the example in his text range to the north of England, following his experience and affection, avoiding the "impure schools" of Spain and of Germany. By the time of the second edition (1855), Ruskin had fixed his exemplars more certainly:

I have now no doubt that the only style proper for modern northern work, is the Northern Gothic of the thirteenth century, as exemplified, in England, pre-eminently by the cathedrals of Lincoln and Wells, and, in France, by those of Paris, Amiens, Chartres, Rheims, and Bourges, and by the transepts of that of Rouen.

The importance of authentic detail to Ruskin is exemplified in the daguerreotypes from which he made drawings of details too high to see clearly, and his urgent plea to amateur photographers in the Preface to the Second Edition, which presages the formative role that photography of architectural details was to play during the next decades, not only in Gothic Revival buildings:

...while a photograph of landscape is merely an amusing toy, one of early architecture is a precious historical document; and that this architecture should be taken, not merely when it presents itself under picturesque general forms, but stone by stone, and sculpture by sculpture.

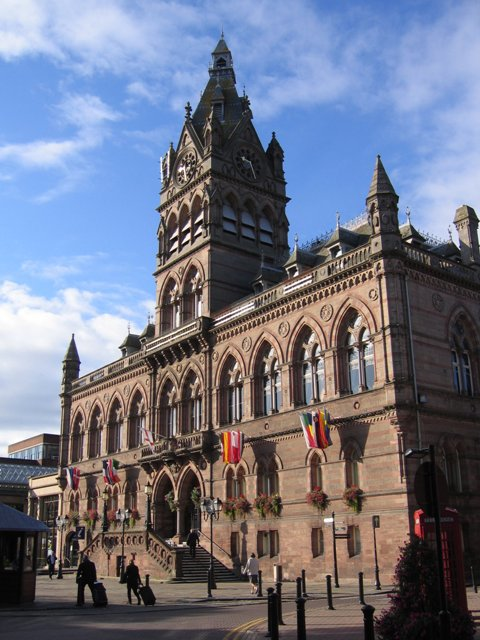
Polychromy in Ruskinian Gothic: Chester Town Hall, 1863–1869 William Henry Lynn, architect

== Gothic Revival ==
By 1849, A. W. N. Pugin and others had already advanced the ideas of the Gothic Revival and its popularity was secured. Ruskin offered little new to the debate, but the book helped to capture and summarise the thoughts of the movement, proved a great popular success, and received the approval of The ecclesiologists, the influential newsletter of architectural criticism published by the Cambridge Camden Society. Effects such as the polychromy of High Victorian Gothic architecture may be traced to him, in a genre of "Ruskinian Gothic" that was practised in Britain and colonies like New Zealand and Canada, and in Anglophile strata of the United States.

== Legacy ==
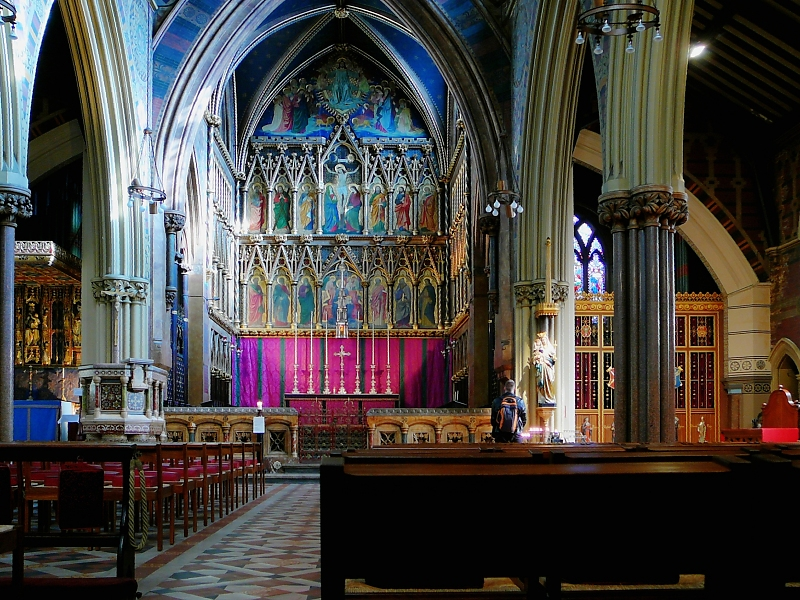
All Saints, Margaret Street by Beresford-Hope and Butterfield was immediately influenced by Ruskin's essay, particularly in its structural use of brick, rather than for surface decoration

Ruskin had made his debut as a critic of architecture with The Poetry of Architecture (1839), an essay in the picturesque that he later rejected, The Seven Lamps were still tentative steps for Ruskin's architectural criticism and offered a moral creed for architects. He later went on to disclaim the essay as a 'wretched rant'.

The first effect of the book was almost immediate in the influence it had upon William Butterfield's All Saints, Margaret Street Church. Politician Alexander Beresford Hope and architect Butterfield had agreed upon the general details just a month after Ruskin's book was published and by August they had revised their plans to encapsulate the principles it espoused. All Saints is considered the first Ruskinian building due to its use of brick 'honestly' employed as a structural system rather than for surface decoration.

Ruskin's writings became a significant influence on William Morris and the Arts and Crafts Movement in the latter half of the 19th century. In the United States, Ralph Waldo Emerson's expectations of a new, authentic American style had prepared the ground: Ruskin's Seven Lamps were quickly assimilated into the aesthetics of Transcendentalism.

In 1899 Marcel Proust read a translation of Ruskin's chapter The Lamp of Memory in a Belgian magazine. He projected the transforming experience onto the narrator of Du côté de chez Swann, who describes himself as a boy reading the piece in the garden at Combray. Later Proust, who translated some works of Ruskin, claimed to know The Seven Lamps of Architecture by heart.

Seven Lamps of Architecture and other of Ruskin's writings on architecture are summarized and extensively quoted in John Unrau, Looking at Architecture with Ruskin (Toronto: University of Toronto), 1978.

In Lewis Carroll's poem Hiawatha's Photographing (1857), the title of the book forms an entire line, together with Ruskin's other main works The Stones of Venice and Modern Painters.

He had learned it all from Ruskin
(Author of The Stones of Venice,
Seven Lamps of Architecture,
Modern Painters, and some others);
And perhaps he had not fully
Understood his author's meaning.

== Gallery ==
Writing in the preface to the first edition Ruskin remarks;

Every apology is, however, due to the reader for the hasty and imperfect execution of the plates. Having much more serious work in hand, and desiring merely to render them illustrative of my meaning, I have sometimes very completely failed even of that humble aim; and the text, being generally written before the illustration was completed, sometimes naively describes as sublime or beautiful features which the plates represents by a blot. I shall be grateful if the reader will in such cases refer the expressions of praise to the Architecture, and not to the illustrations.

The following illustrations are from the third edition where the situation had been much improved.

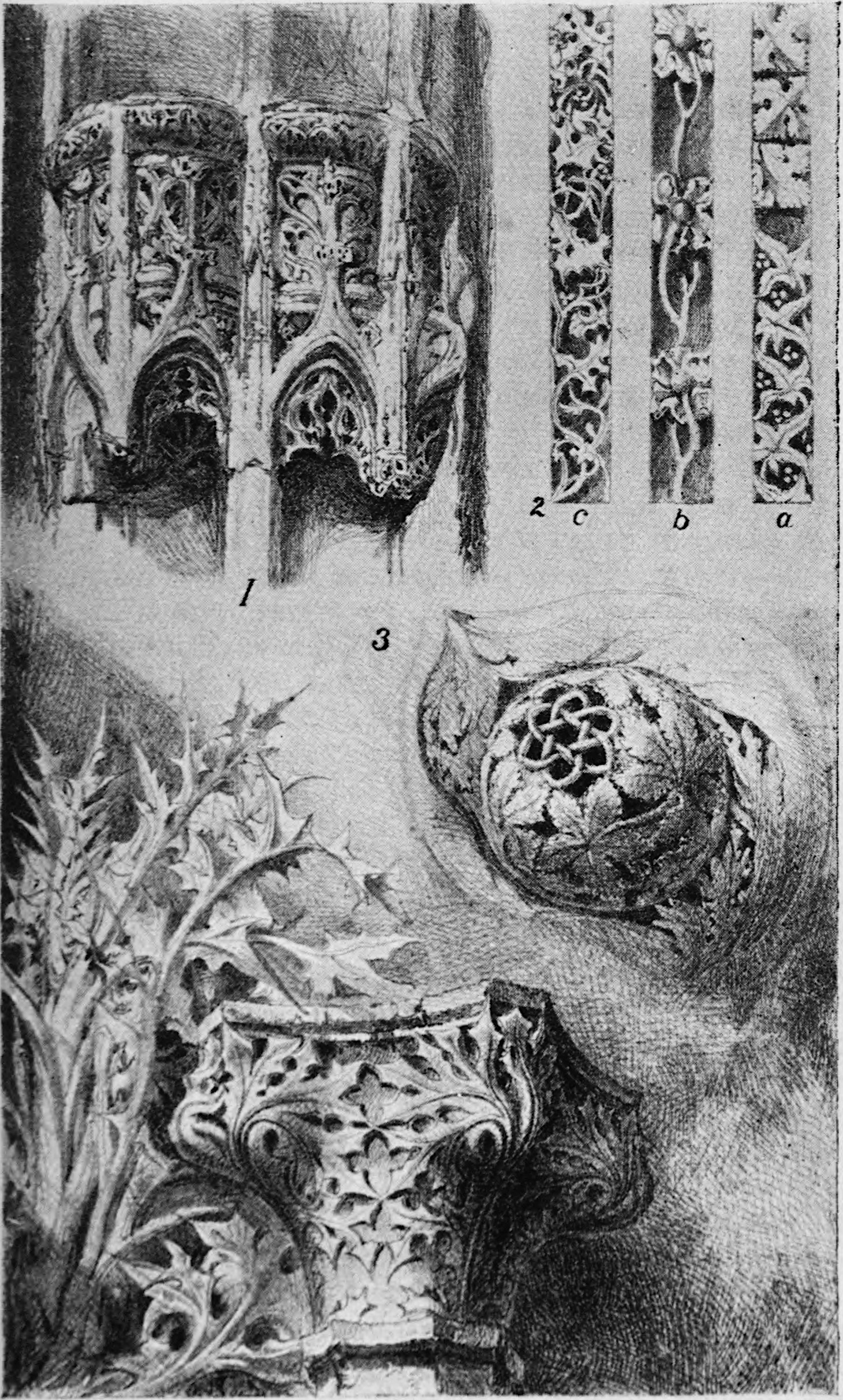
Ornaments from Rouen, St Lo and Venice

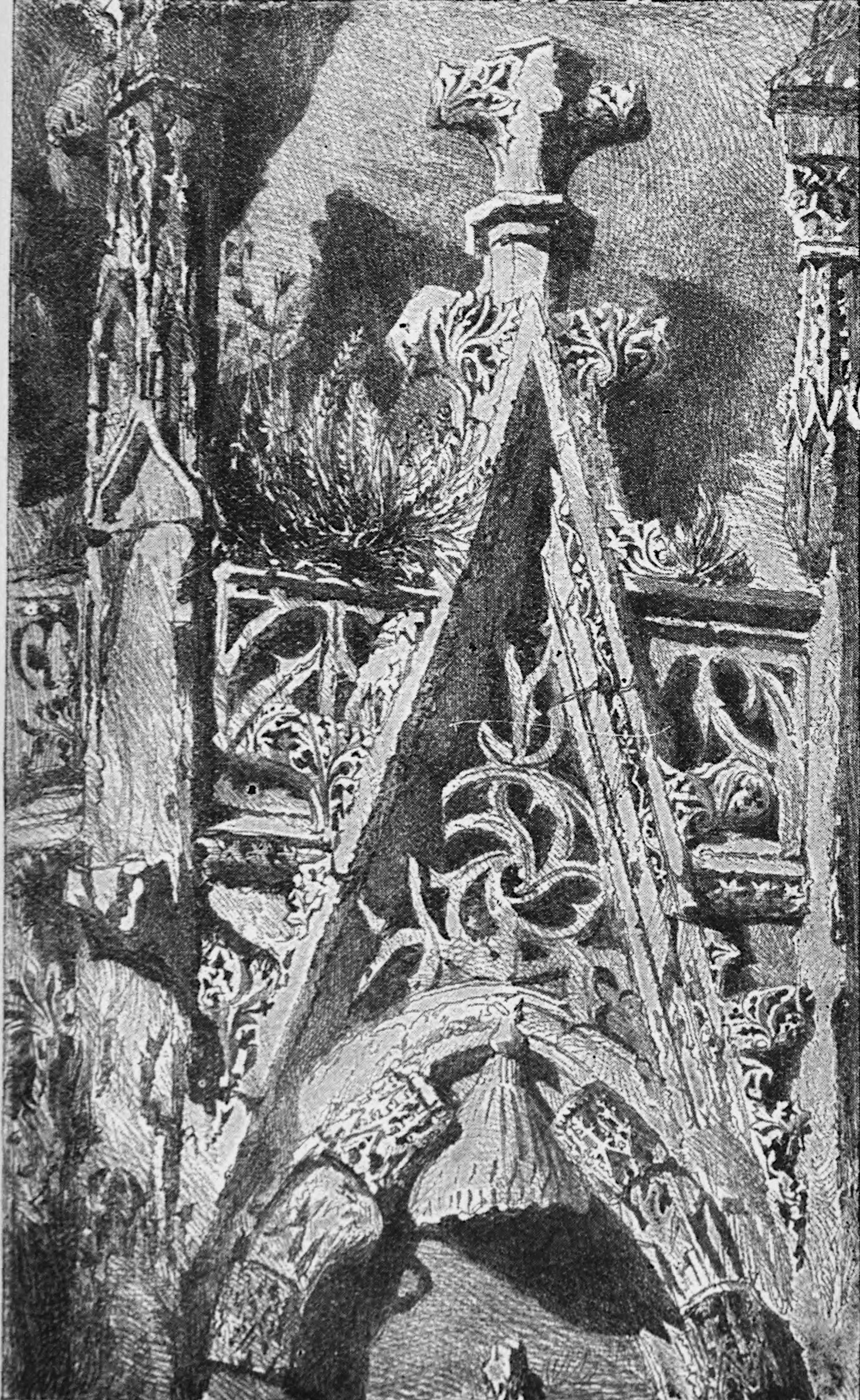
Part of the Cathedral of St Lo, Normandy

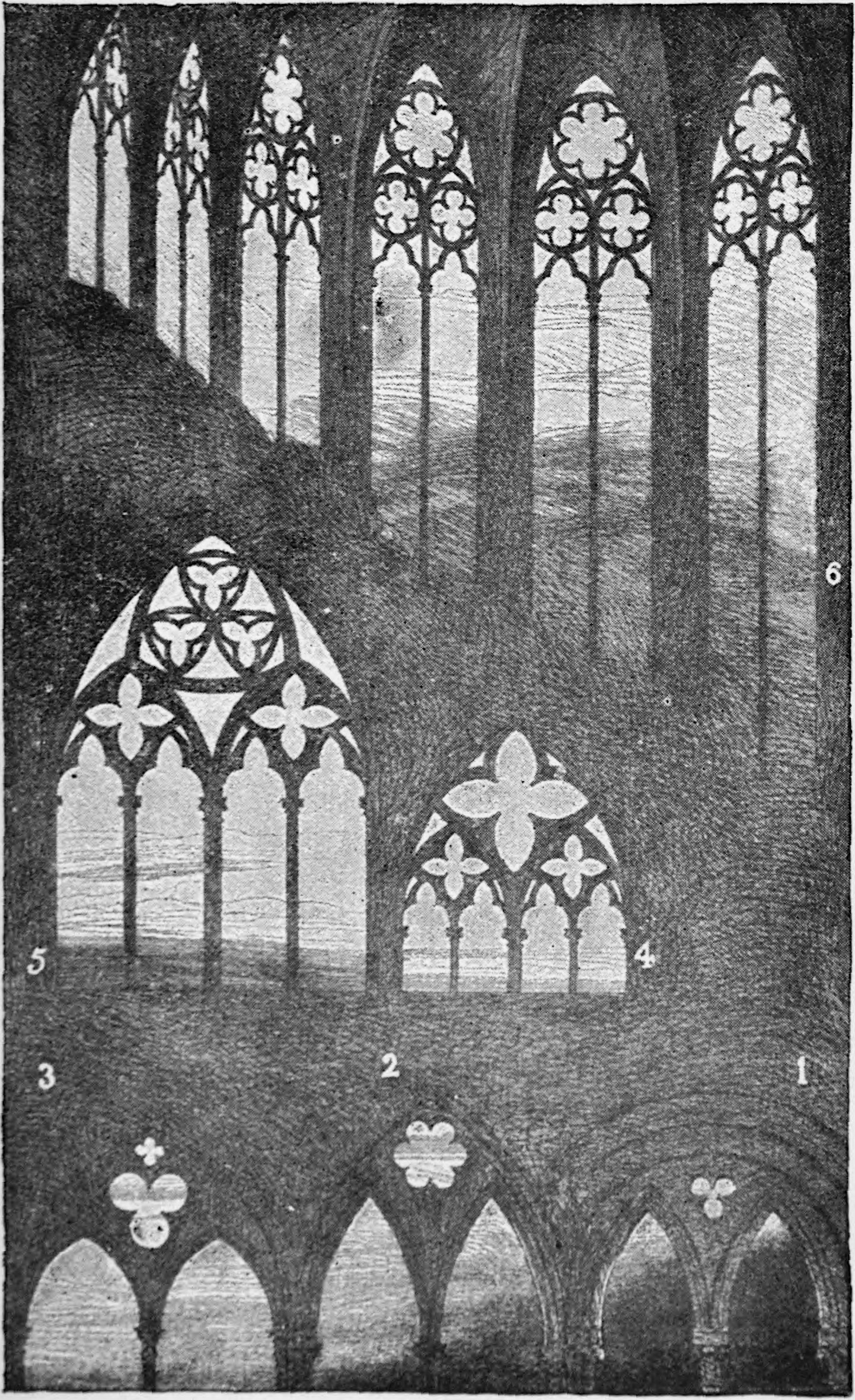
Traceries from Caen, Bayeux, Rouen, and Beauvais

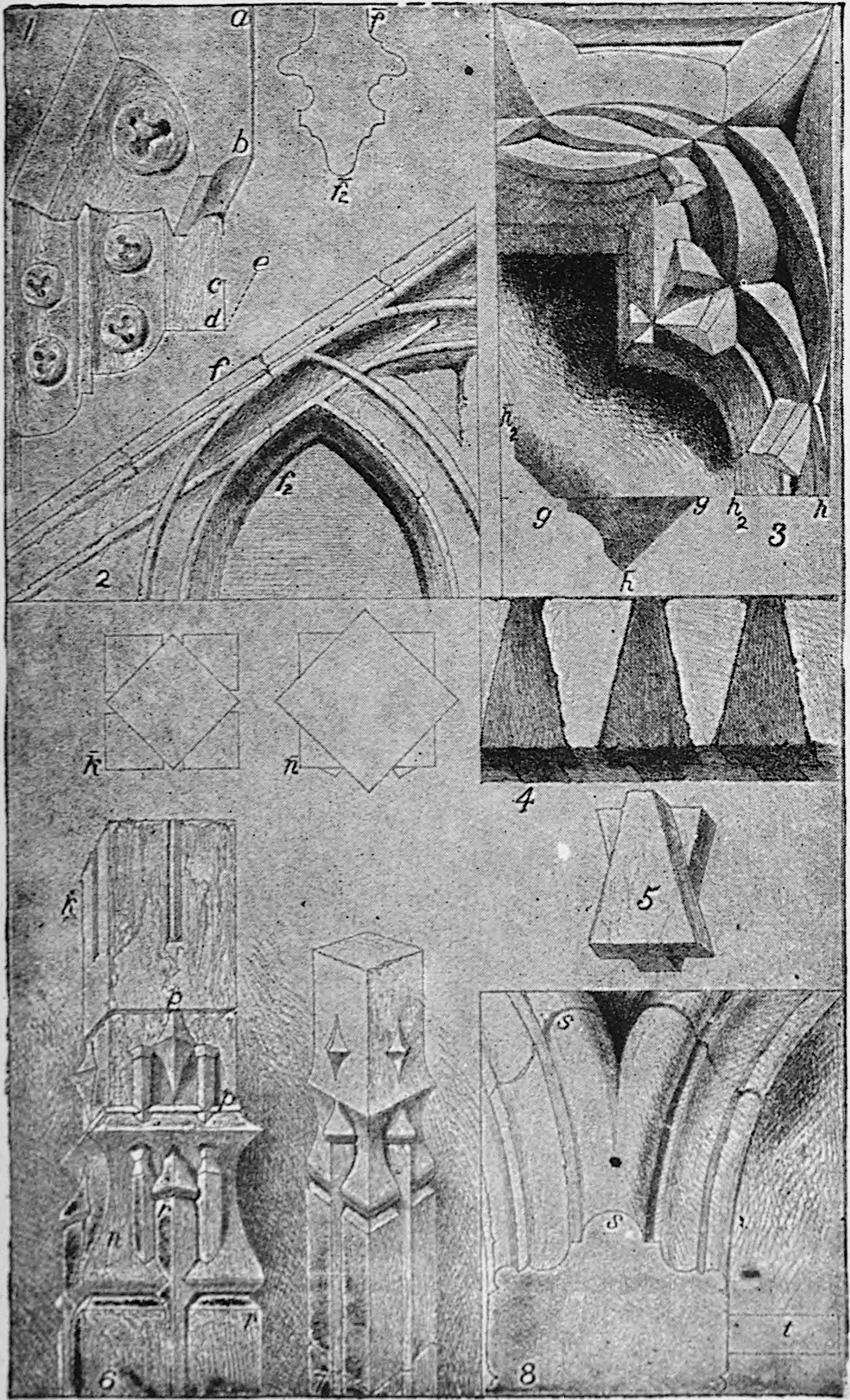
Intersectional Mouldings

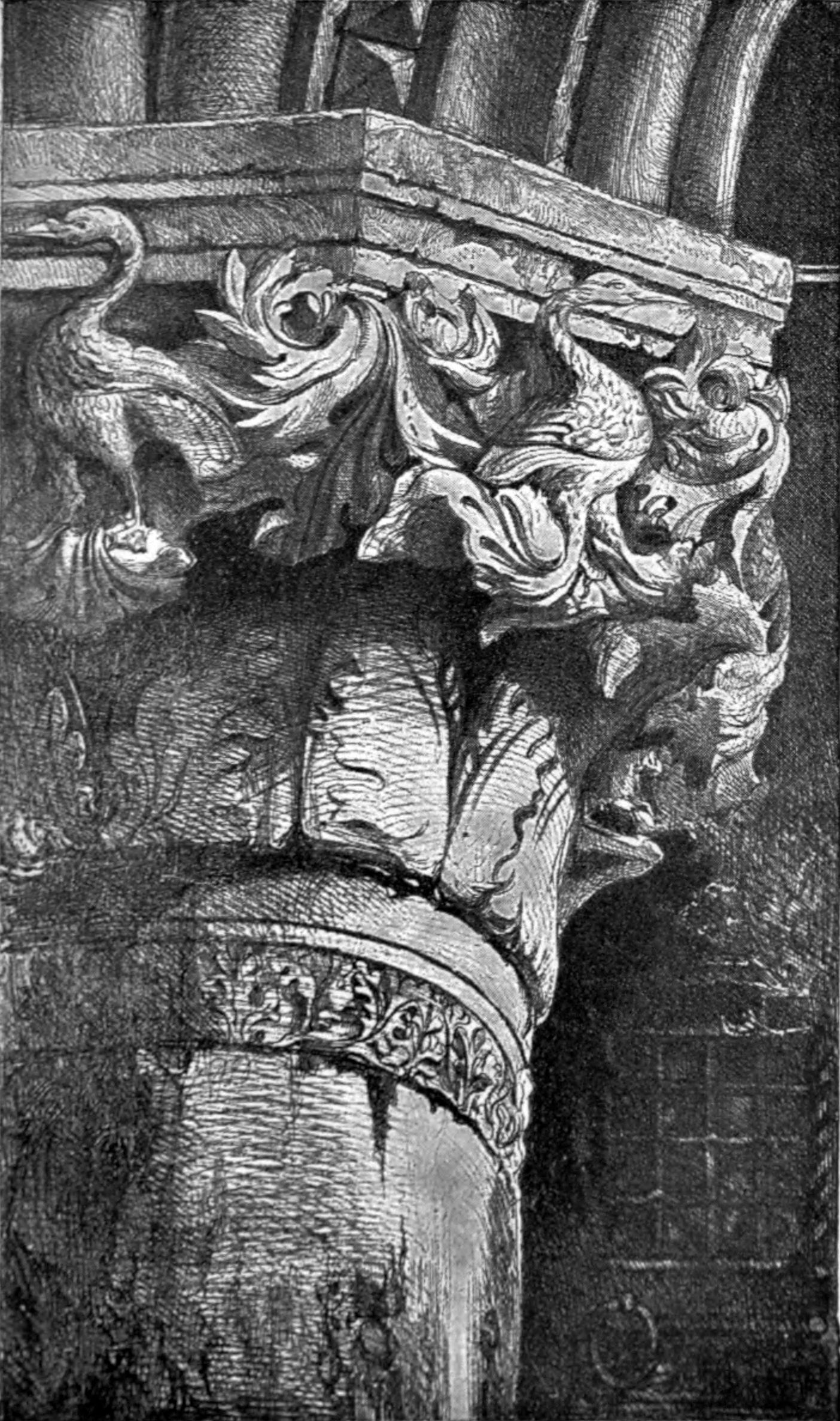
Capital from the Lower Arcade of the Doge's Palace, Venice

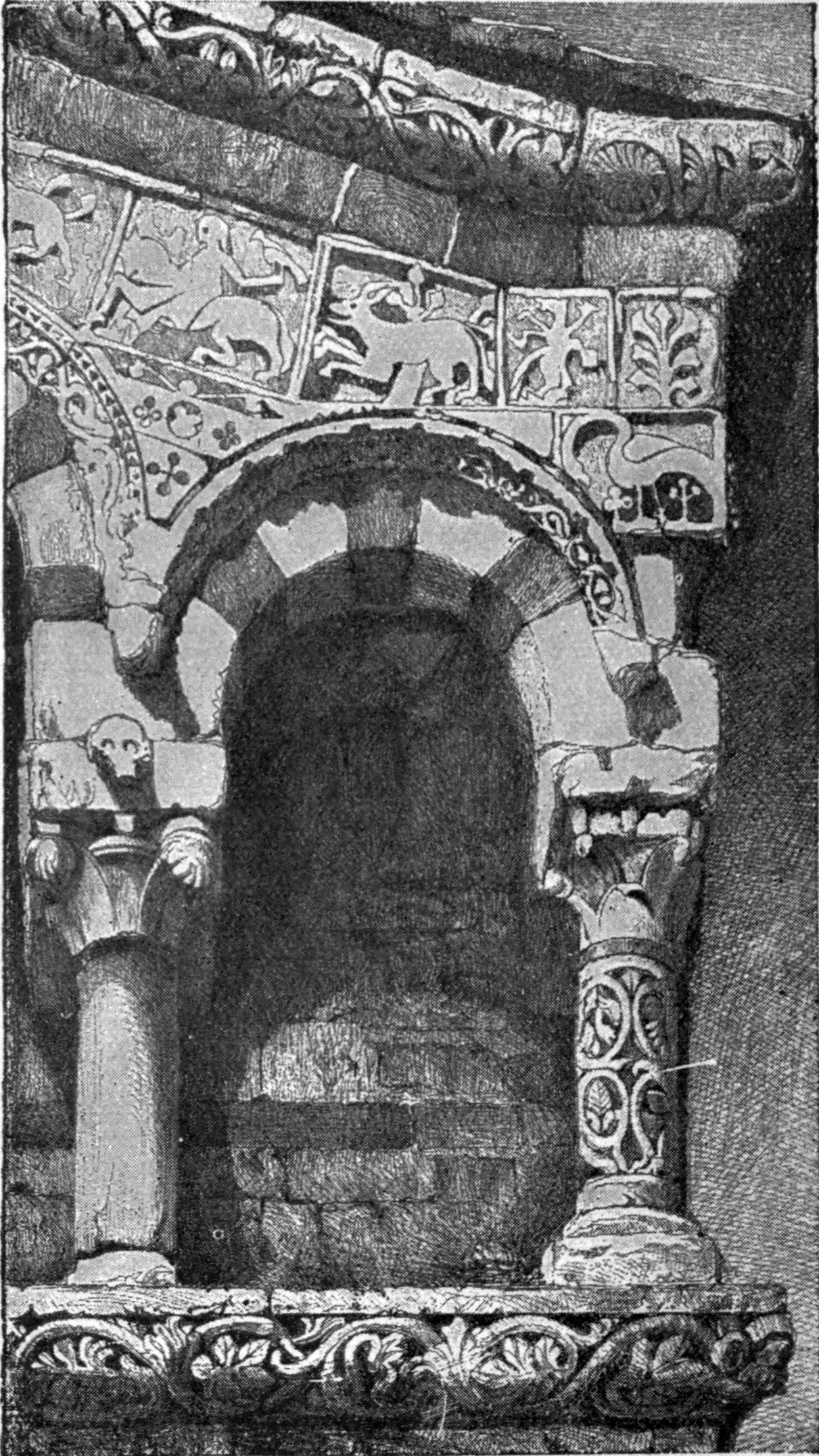
Arch from the Façade of the Church of San Michele at Lucca

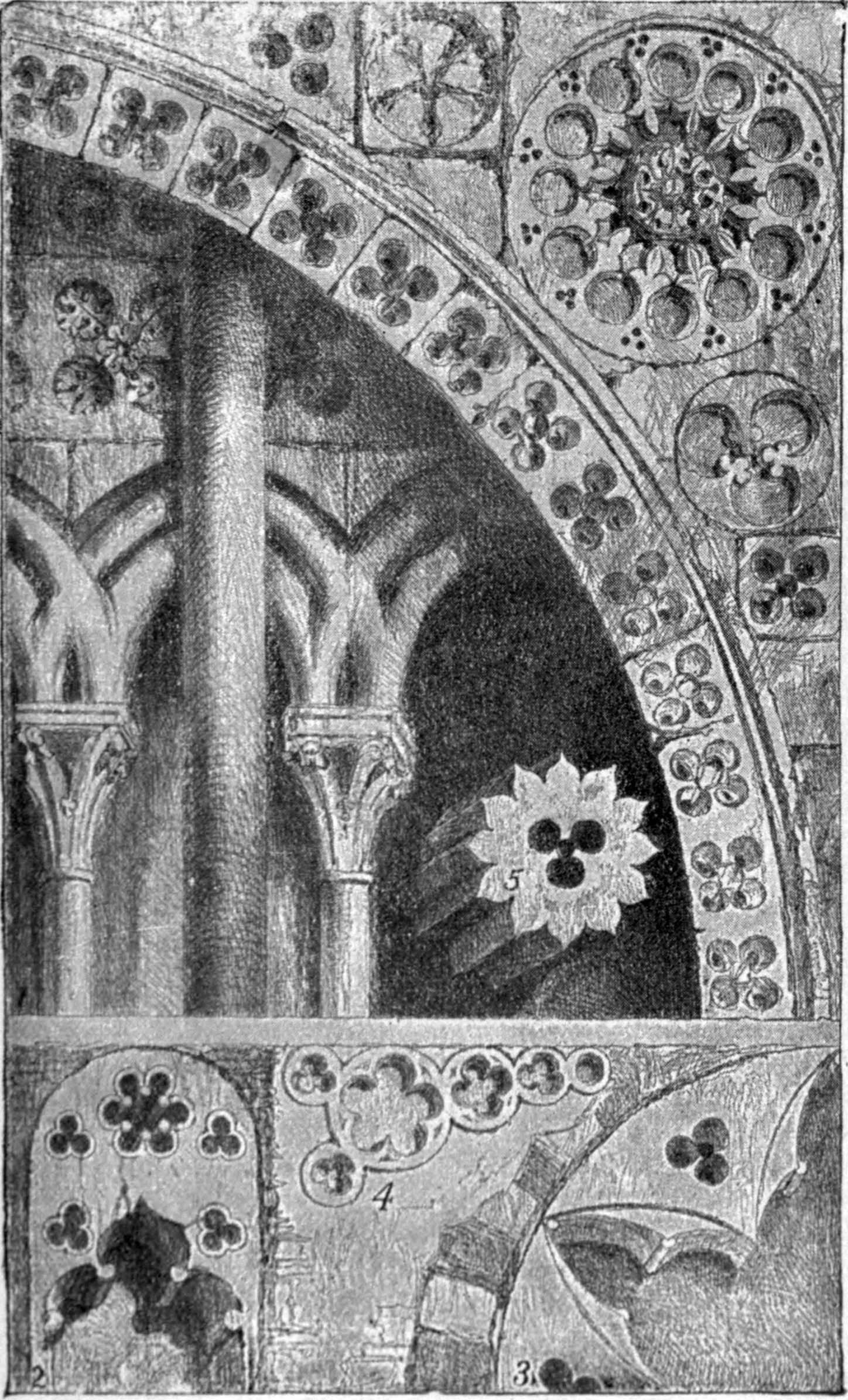
Pierced Ornaments from Lisieux, Bayeux, Verona, and Padua

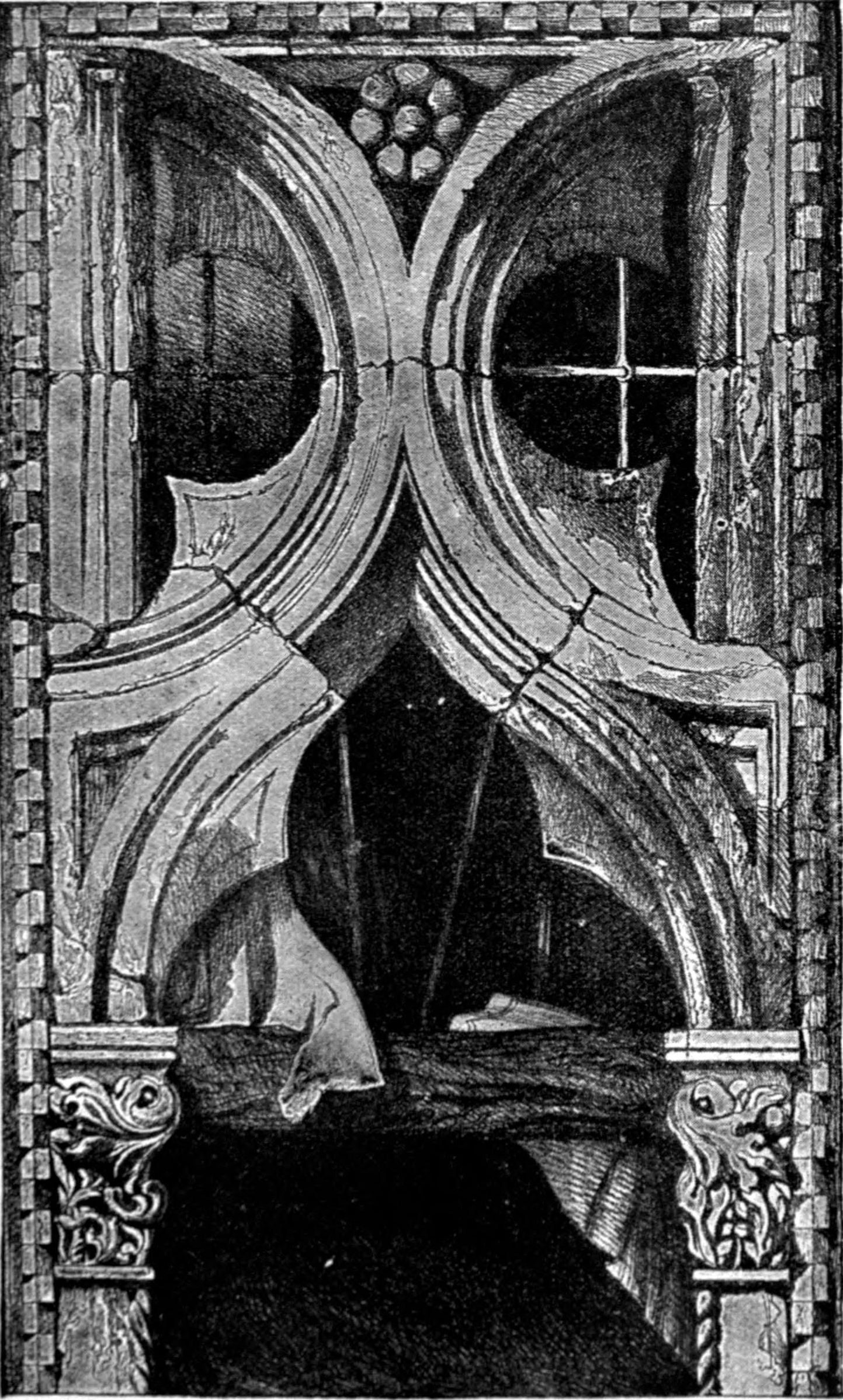
Window from the Ca' Foscari, Venice

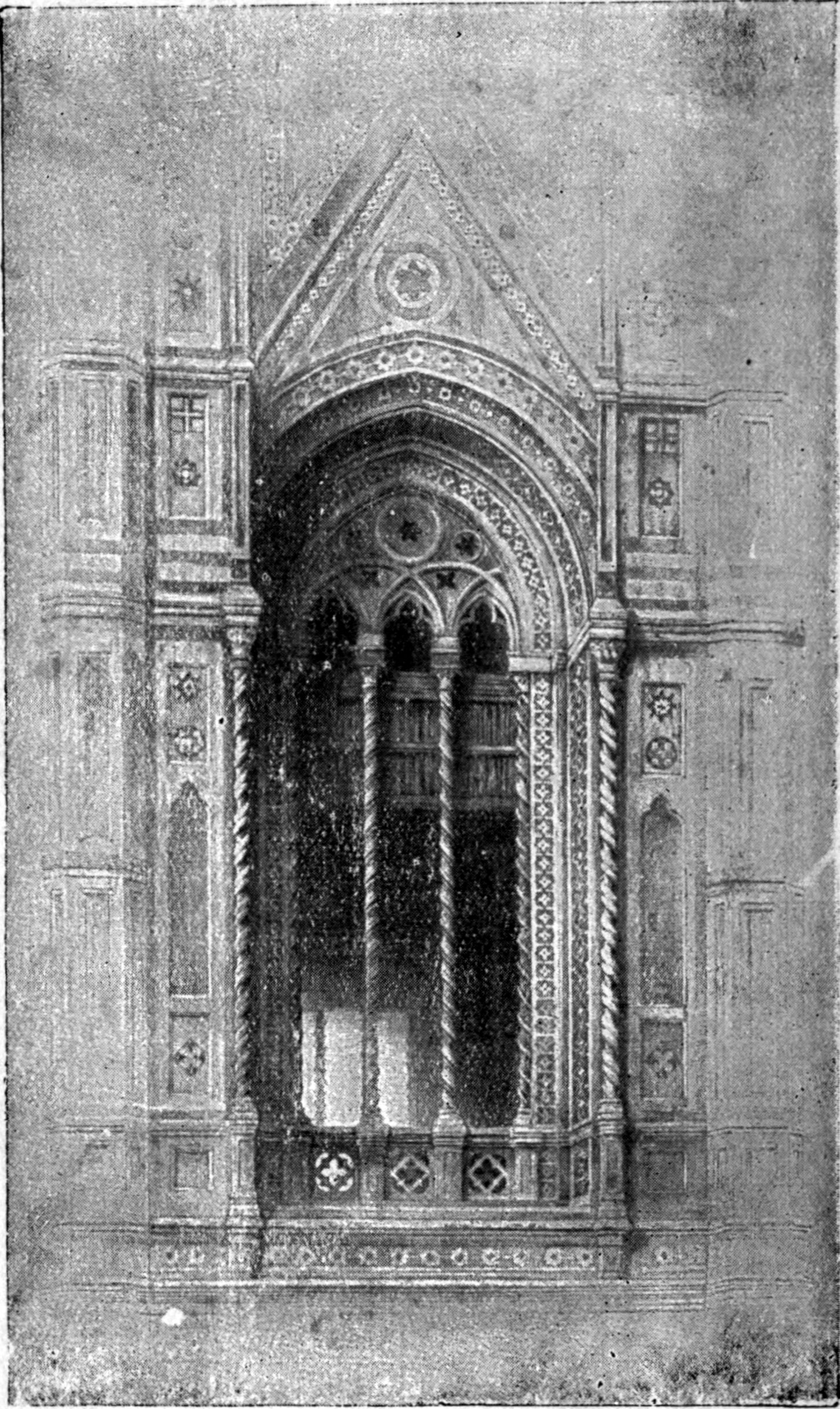
Tracery from the Campanile of Giotto, at Florence

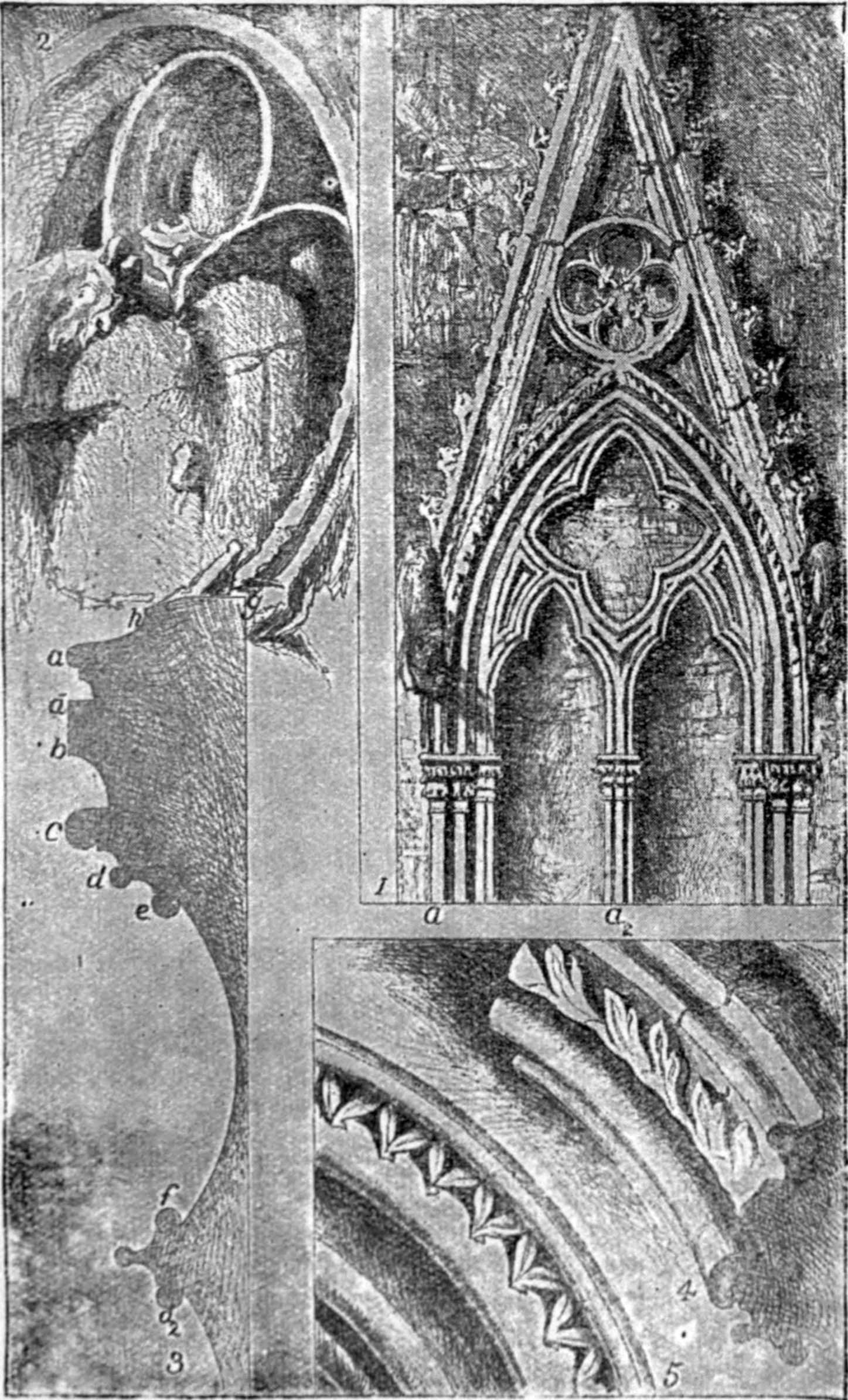
Traceries and mouldings from Rouen and Salisbury

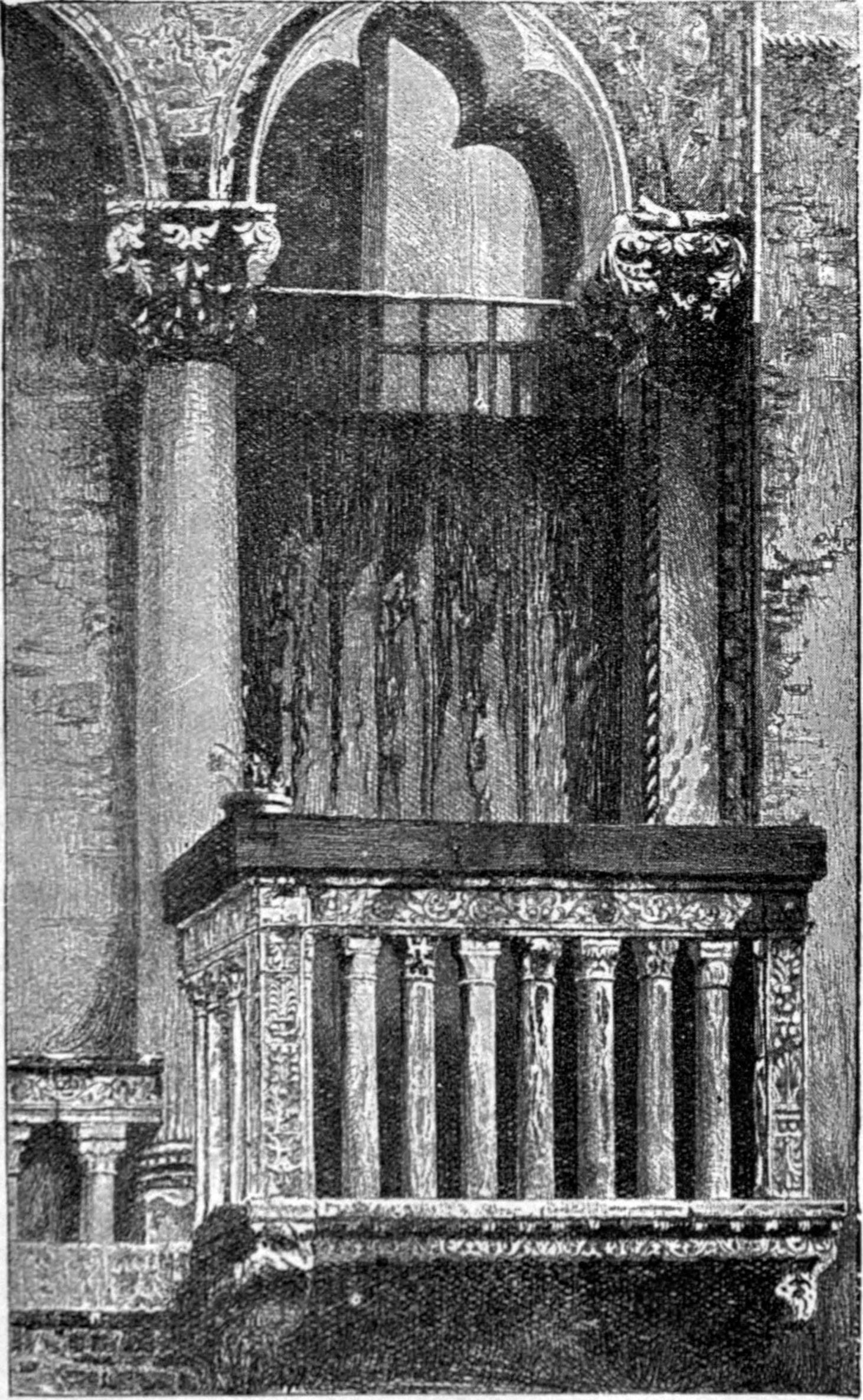
Balcony in the Campo St Benedetto, Venice

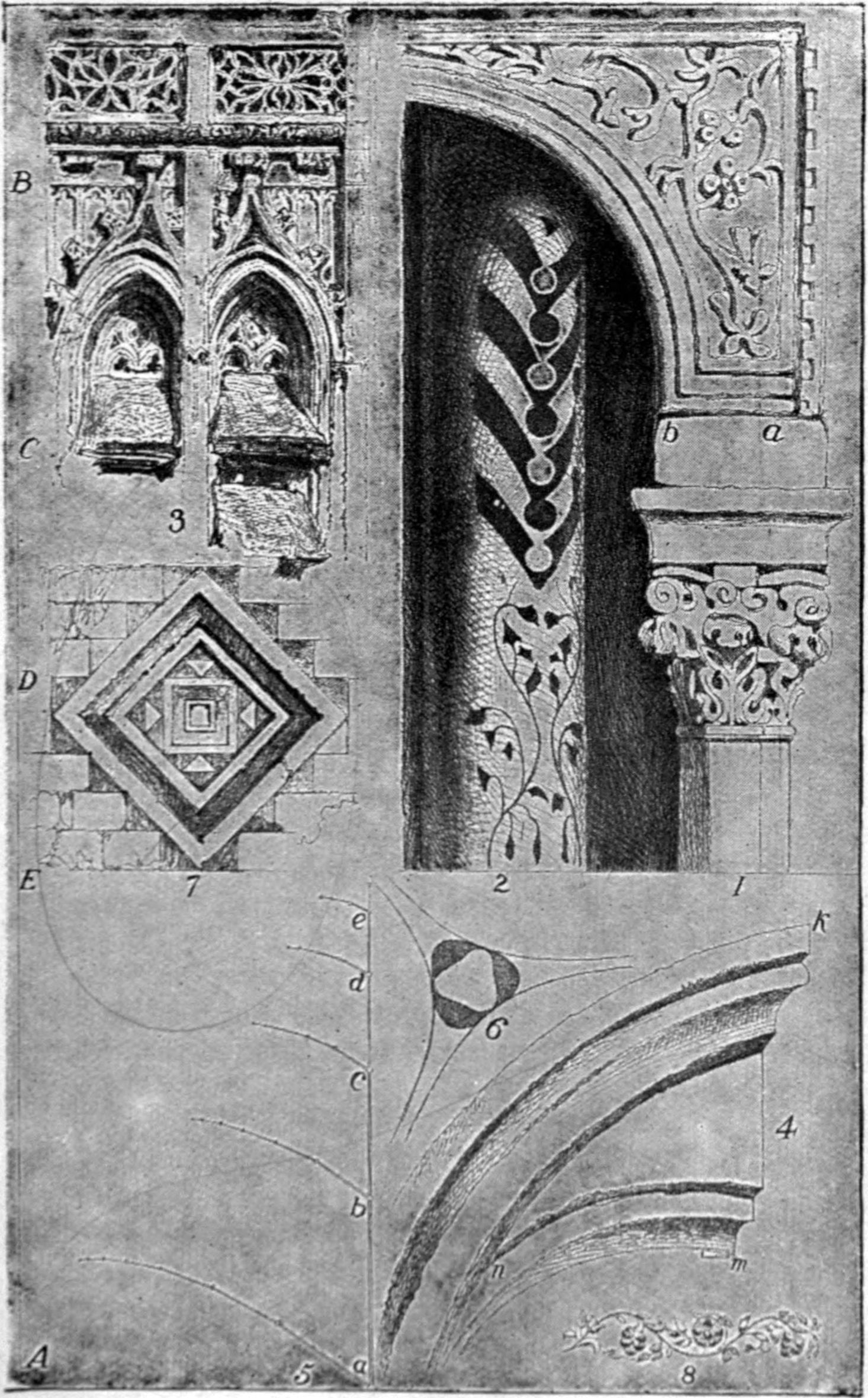
Fragments from Abbeville, Lucca, Venice and Pisa

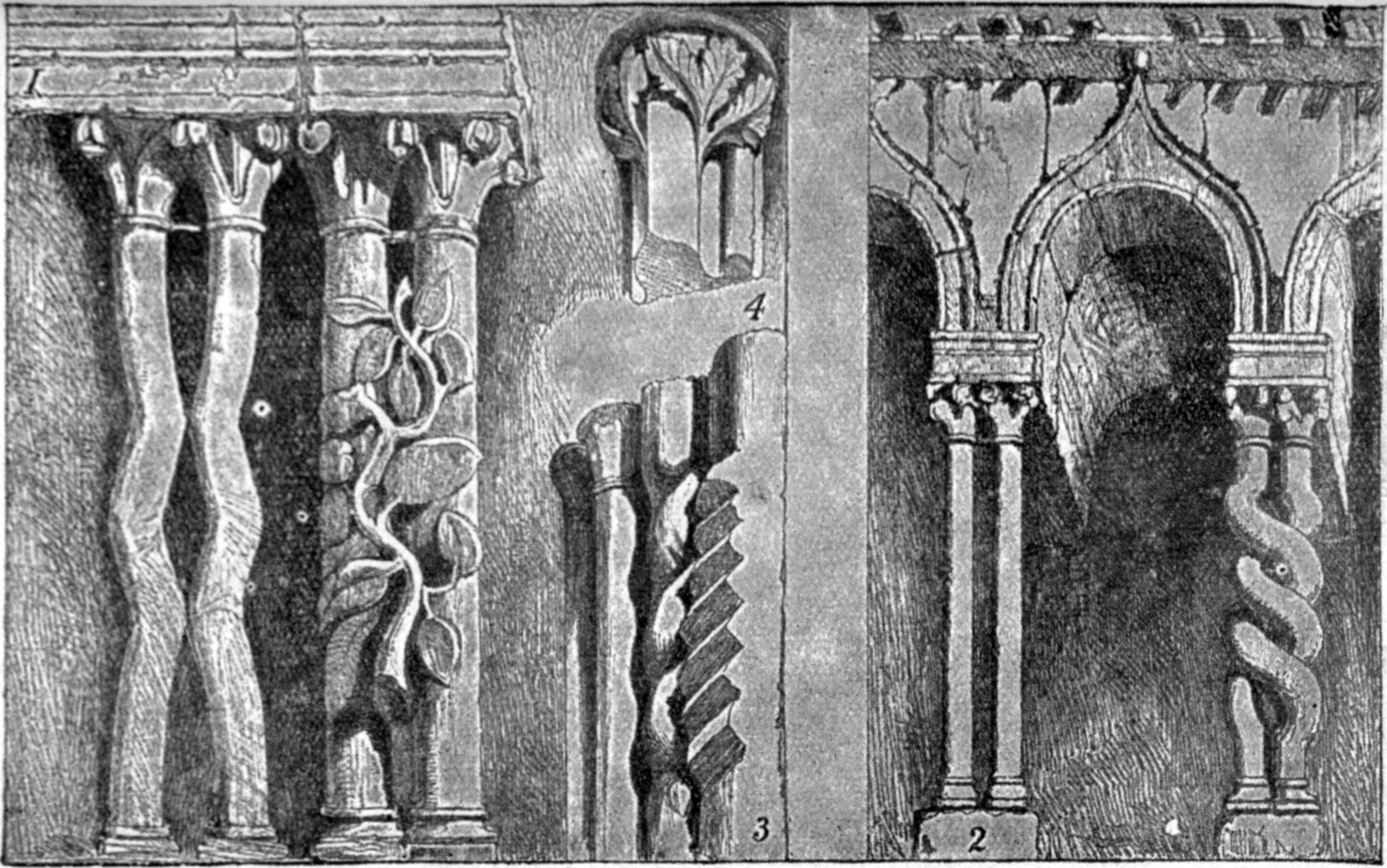
Portion of an Arcade on the South Side of the Cathedral of Ferrara

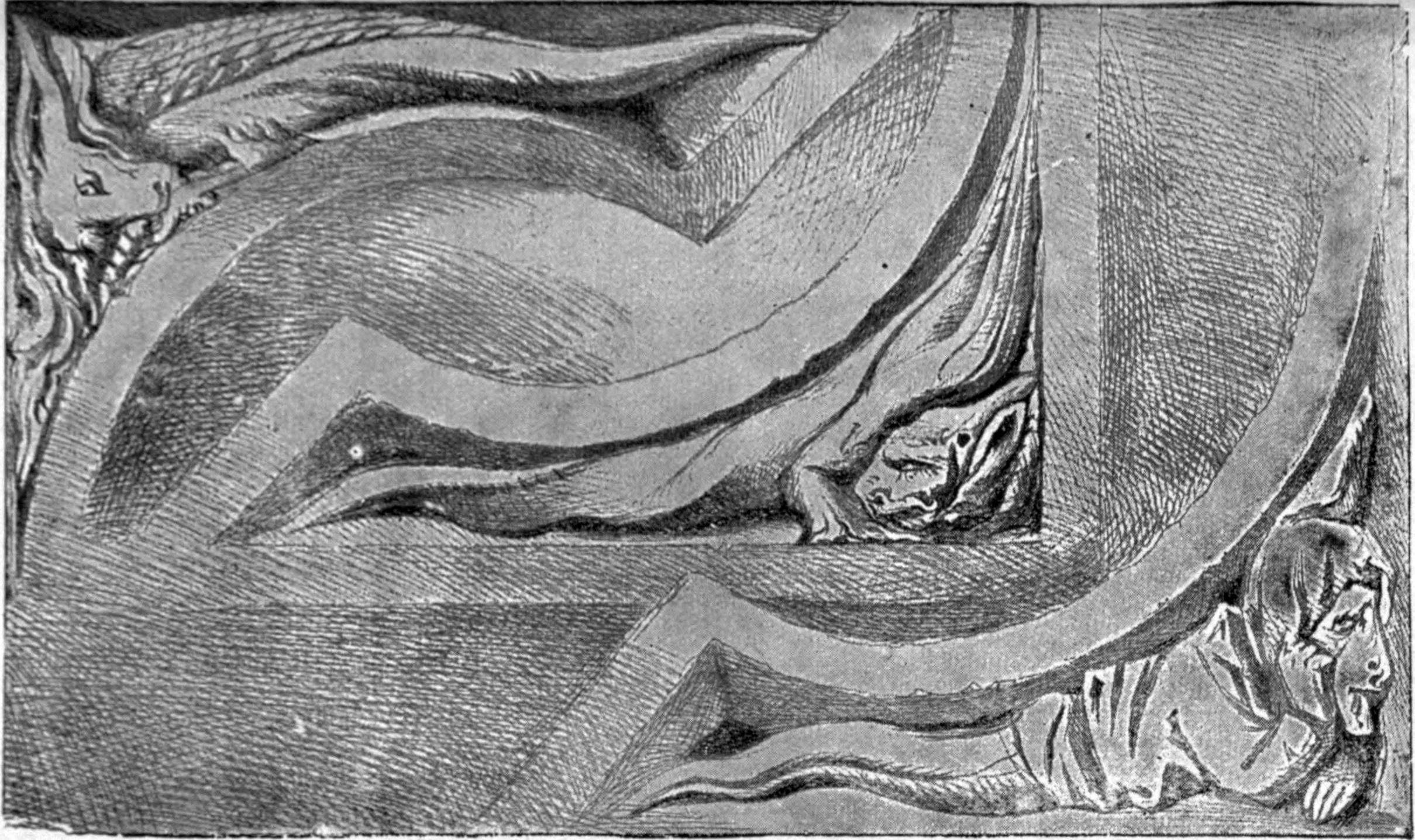
Sculptures from the Cathedral of Rouen

== See also ==
- The Stones of Venice
- Writings of A. W. N. Pugin
