= Redintegration =

Reconstruction of the whole of something, from a part

Redintegration refers to the restoration of the whole of something from a part of it. The everyday phenomenon is that a small part of a memory can remind a person of the entire memory, for example, “recalling an entire song when a few notes are played.” In cognitive psychology the word is used in reference to phenomena in the field of memory, where it is defined as "the use of long-term knowledge to facilitate recall." The process is hypothesised to be working as "pattern completion", where previous knowledge is used to facilitate the completion of the partially degraded memory trace.

== Proust ==
The great literary example of redintegration is Marcel Proust's novel Remembrance of Things Past. The conceit is that the entire seven-volume novel consists of the memories triggered by the taste of a madeleine soaked in lime tea. "I had recognized the taste of the crumb of madeleine soaked in her concoction of lime-flowers which my aunt used to give to me. Immediately the old grey house upon the street, where her room was, rose up like the scenery of a theatre to attach itself to the little pavilion, opening on to the garden, which had been built out behind it for my parents..."

== Associationists ==
The Associationist School of philosophical psychologists sought to explain redintegration (among other memory-related phenomena) and used it as evidence supporting their theories.

== Contemporary memory research ==
In the study of item recall in working memory, memories that have partially decayed can be recalled in their entirety. It is hypothesized that this is accomplished by a redintegration process, which allows the entire memory to be reconstructed from the temporary memory trace by using the subject's previous knowledge. The process seems to work because of the redundancy of language. The effects of long-term knowledge on memory’s trace reconstruction have been shown for both visual and auditory presentation and recall. The mechanism of redintegration is still not fully understood and is being actively researched.

== Models of redintegration ==
=== Multinomial processing tree ===
Schweickert (1993) attempted to model memory redintegration using a multinomial processing tree. In a multinomial processing tree, the cognitive processes and their outcomes are represented with branches and nodes, respectively. The outcome of the cognitive effort is dependent on which terminal node is reached.

In Schweickert's model of recall, a trace of memory can be either intact or partially degraded. If the trace is intact, memory can be restored promptly and accurately. The node for correct recall is reached, and the recall process is terminated. If the memory has partially degraded, the item must be reconstructed through trace redintegration. If the process of redintegration was successful, the memory is recalled correctly.

Thus, the probability of correct recall ($P_C$) is:
$$P_C = I + R*(1-I)$$
Where:

$I$ is the probability of trace being intact, and $R$ is the probability of correct redintegration.

If the trace is neither intact nor successfully completely redintegrated, person fails to accurately recall the memory.

==== Trace redintegration ====
Schweickert (1993) proposed that the redintegration of a memory trace happens through two independent processes. In the lexical process, the memory trace is attempted to be converted into a word. In the phonemic process, the memory trace is attempted to be converted into a string of phonemes. Consequently, the probability of correct redintegration ($R$), becomes a function of $L$ (lexical process) and/or $P$ (phonemic process). These processes are autonomous, and their effect on $R$ depends on whether they take place sequentially or non-sequentially.

Schweickert’s explanation of trace redintegration is analogous to the processes hypothesized to be responsible for repairs of errors in speech.

Though Schweickert indicates that the process of trace redintegration may be facilitated by the context of the situation in which recall takes place (e.g. syntax, semantics), his model does not provide details on the potential influences of such factors.

==== Extensions ====
Schweickert's model was extended by Gathercole and colleagues (1999), who added a concept of degraded trace. Their model of the multinomial processing tree included an additional node, which represents a decayed memory. Such degraded trace can no longer undergo redintegration, and the outcome of recall is incorrect. Thus, the probability of correct recall ($P_C$) changes to:
$$P_C = I + R*(1-I-T)$$
Where:

$I$ is the probability of trace being intact, $R$ is the probability of correct redintegration, and $T$ is the probability of trace being entirely lost.

==== Criticism ====
The main criticism of Schweickert's model concerns its discrete nature. The model treats memory in a binomial manner, where a trace can be either intact, leading to correct recall, or partially decayed, with subsequent successful or unsuccessful redintegration. It does not explain the factors underlying the intactness, and cannot account for the differences in the number of failed attempts to recall different items. Moreover, the model does not incorporate the concept of the degree of memory degradation, implying that the level of a trace’s decay does not affect the probability of redintegration. This issue was approached by Roodenrys and Miller (2008), whose alternative account of redintegration uses constrained Rasch model to portray trace degradation as a continuous process.

== Influencing factors ==
=== Lexicality ===
In immediate recall, trace reconstruction is more accurate for words than for non-words. This has been labeled the lexicality effect. The effect is hypothesized to occur due to the differences in the presence and availability of phonological representations. Contrarily to non-words, words possess stable mental representations of the accompanying sounds. Such representation can be retrieved from previous knowledge, facilitating the redintegration of item from the memory trace. The lexicality effect is commonly used to support the importance of long-term memory in the redintegration processes.

=== Item similarity ===
The redintegration of memory traces may be affected by both semantic and phonological similarity of items which are to be recalled.

Redintegration is more accurate for lists of semantically homogenous items than for lists of semantically heterogeneous items. This has been attributed to the differences in the accessibility of different memories in the long-term store. When words are presented in semantically homogenous lists, other items may guide the trace reconstruction, providing a cue for item search. This increases the availability of certain memories and facilitates the redintegration process. An example would be a redintegration attempt for a word from a list of animal names. The semantic consistency of words evokes the memories associated with this matter, making the animal names more accessible in the memory.

Contrarily, redintegration has been shown to be hindered for items sharing phonological features. This has been attributed to the “trace competition”, where errors in redintegration are caused by mistaking the items on the lists. This effect could arise for example for the words auction (/ˈɔːkʃ(ə)n/) and audience (/ˈɔːdiəns/). The effect of phonological similarity on redintegration may differ depending on the position of phenomes shared within the items.

=== Word frequency ===
Redintegration processes appear more accurate for words that are encountered more frequently in the language. This effect has been attributed to the differences in the availability of items stored in long-term memory. Frequently encountered words are hypothesized to be more accessible for subsequent recall, which facilitates the reconstruction of memory redintegration of the partially degraded trace.

=== Phonotactic frequency ===
Trace reconstruction appears more accurate for items that contain phoneme combinations frequently represented in the language. Though this effect is similar to the word-frequency effect, it can also explain patterns in redintegration of non-word items.

=== Others ===
Other factors which have been shown to facilitate redintegration include the ease of item imageability, familiarity with the language, and word concreteness.

== See also ==
- Stream of consciousness (psychology)
