= Pair by association =

In relation to psychology, pair by association is the action of associating a stimulus with an arbitrary idea or object, eliciting a response, usually emotional. This is done by repeatedly pairing the stimulus with the arbitrary object.

For example, repeatedly pairing images of beautiful women in bathing suits elicits a sexual response in most men. Advertising agencies repeatedly pair products with attractive women in television commercials with the intention of eliciting an emotional or sexually aroused response in the consumer. This causes the consumer to be more likely to buy the product than when presented with a similar product without such an association.

== Hippocampus ==
The hippocampal area, beyond its importance in episodic memory is in part responsible in the creation and storage of associations in the memory, especially for item associations. Furthermore, as stated by Gilbert & Kesner, the associations that are created are those that might be "critical" in paired-associative learning. Through studies on rats, it has been found that lesions to the hippocampus lead to object-place associative learning impairments. The findings of hippocampal damage that lead to impairments in the association between object-place as Gilbert & Kesner state have been seen in not only rodents but also non-human primates and humans. Previously learned associations made before the damage to the hippocampal area were not affected with impairment. Gilbert & Kesner have suggested in their work that this ability to still recall previously stored associations may be due to modified synapses in an "auto associative network".

== Pair by Association Task ==
Paired association learning can be defined as a system of learning in which items (such as words, letters, numbers, symbols etc.) are matched so that presentation of one member of the pair will cue the recall of the other member. It is this learning which constitutes the basics in a paired-associate task. These tasks can be divided into the following: visual-visual, verbal-verbal, and visual-verbal. In visual-visual both members of the pair are in a visual form (e.g. the picture of a blue circle paired with that of a picture of a yellow triangle). The verbal-verbal is when the members of the pair are both verbally presented (e.g. listening to the word cat followed by the word hat spoken to a participant). The last form, visual-verbal is when one member of the pair is spoken out loud while the other member is presented in a visual form (e.g. listening to the word box and seeing a picture of a house). Visual associative learning has a positive association with age. In school age children, their visual association ability grows in conjunction with their age; younger children made more errors while older children made less.

The paired association task broken down to its basics is: a stimuli, response, and the consequence of the cue association. This is best seen in a study where Naya, Sakai, & Miyashita performed one version of the task on monkeys. In the study a primate was given a visual-visual paired-associate task where they were shown all the pairs in the set. Then after a long delay they displayed one picture of a pair to the primate. When the correct picture was paired by the monkey, showing that the pictures were cueing the response, they were given rewards in the form of food. What this study shows is that it is possible for associations to occur for two previously unrelated items. The monkeys showed they had actually remembered what was shown to them. In visual associative learning, the efficiency of the participant/subject in making these connections actually will decrease as the "memory load" increases. The more items/the higher the complexity that one has to keep in their memory leads to poorer performance on paired associative learning tasks.

Gluck, Mercado, and Myers explain how paired-association is possibly tied to encoding rather than retrieval. In the study presented by Gluck et al., there was a paired associates test where after studying word pairs the participants were presented with one word from the pair and required to recall the match there was a noticeable difference in accuracy between the young adult and older adults. At the start of the study each pair was shown for 15 seconds, in this the older adults had much worse performance; their recall abilities paled in comparison to the younger adults. This however did change when the time was doubled to that of 30 seconds; here the elderly were able to have a much improved performance level. It is an accepted understanding that in associative learning there is a negative regression, as one ages their performance levels decrease. The regression remains even after addressing the possible interfering variables such as attention or spatial memory.

=== Performance on Task ===
When the paired association task is performed, there are ways in which the performance in the task can be either negatively or positively affected. Associations suffer when an item is shared between associations; double function pairs such as AB and BC will be harder to recall later than control pairs such as AB and CD. As Caplan et al., state double function pairs create what is called association ambiguity, a sharing of a common member in the pair, which leads to interference. The brain has difficulty in processing the pairs to the point that in some cases one pair will be remembered at the expense of the other pair. An example is in the two word pairs CAR-HORN and CAR-DOG. In this word pair a participant would remember 1 pair primarily while forgetting the other pair. Memory for ambiguous pairs will often suffer compared to unambiguous pairs in both situations of e.g. AB and BC or AB and AC. One matter that is not affected is a cue recall in either direction, forward (cue A, recall B) or backward (cue B, recall A); either direction will not affect the accuracy of the recall. This also holds true for double function pairs.

Additionally, there is ongoing research into the effects ecstasy/polystimulant use has on paired-associate task/learning. In a study by Gallagher et al., it was found that those who used ecstasy/polydrugs had in general more false positive responses, clicking yes (in agreement) when asked if a word pair had been previously presented even if the reality was false, compared to non-users. It was proposed that because creating the association between word pairs requires executive resources, which has been known to be hampered in ecstasy users. This is what has prevented the binding of word pairs. However, as stated by the author, it is not possible to fully attribute these deficits in the task, but it bears noting that there are differences occurring.

An association can be improved with the aid of the production effect which is a finding where speaking a word out loud leads to enhancements in memory compared to reading a word silently. The production effect is not limited to speaking a word aloud; mouthing, writing, whispering, spelling, and typing all lead to an enhanced memory though the level will not be the same as reading aloud. In accordance with Putnam et al., the enhancement in recall in the production effect is because reading aloud creates a more distinctive memory in the encoding process. Moreover, the production effect improved not only pair recognition but also paired-associate recall. These findings hint at a positive link between the production effect and the association between pairs in relation to paired-associate task/learning; using one of the elements in the production effect leads to improved encoding of associations.

== Verbal behavior ==
Behaviorists will often use paired association tests to determine the strength of verbal behavior, in particular, B.F Skinner's concept of the verbal response class called intraverbals.

== See also ==
- Psychology
- Conditioning
- Ivan Pavlov
- Association (psychology)
- Verbal Behavior
