= The Stones of Venice (book) =

Book on Venetian art by John Ruskin

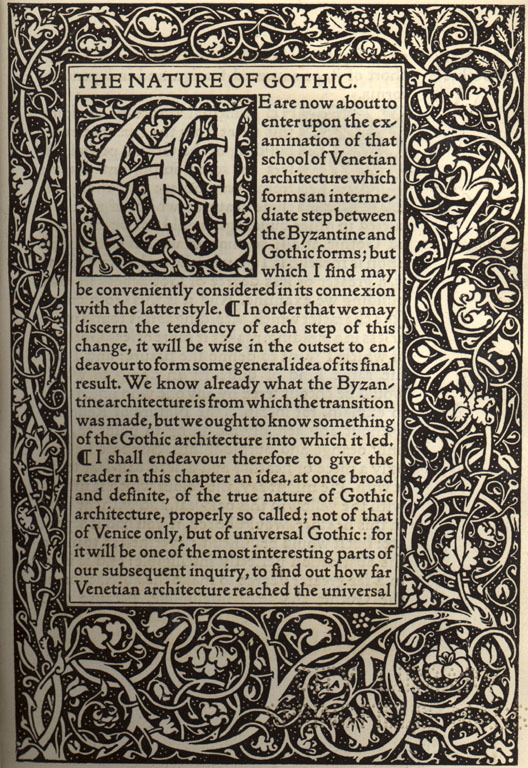
- The Nature of Gothic from the second volume of "The Stones of Venice" in a Kelmscott Press edition. First page of text, with ornamented border.
- Author: John Ruskin
- Language: English
- Publication date: 1851 - 1853
- Publication place: United Kingdom
- Preceded by: The Seven Lamps of Architecture

The Stones of Venice is a three-volume treatise on Venetian art and architecture by English art historian John Ruskin, first published from 1851 to 1853.

The Stones of Venice examines Venetian architecture in detail, describing for example over eighty churches. Ruskin discusses architecture of Venice's Byzantine, Gothic, and Renaissance periods, and provides a general history of the city.

== Views on art and society ==
As well as being an art historian, Ruskin was a social reformer. He set out to prove how Venetian architecture exemplified the principles he discussed in his earlier work, The Seven Lamps of Architecture. In the chapter "The Nature of Gothic" (from volume 2), Ruskin gives his views on how society should be organised.

We want one man to be always thinking, and another to be always working, and we call one a gentleman, and the other an operative; whereas the workman ought often to be thinking, and the thinker often to be working, and both should be gentlemen, in the best sense. As it is, we make both ungentle, the one envying, the other despising, his brother; and the mass of society is made up of morbid thinkers and miserable workers. Now it is only by labour that thought can be made healthy, and only by thought that labour can be made happy, and the two cannot be separated with impunity.

== Research and publication ==
Ruskin had visited Venice before, but he made two visits to Venice with his wife Effie specially to research the book. The first visit was in the winter of 1849–50. The first volume of The Stones of Venice appeared in 1851 and Ruskin spent another winter in Venice researching the next two volumes. His research methods included sketching and photography. Ruskin was initially enthusiastic about photography and by 1849 he had acquired his own camera to take daguerreotypes, a type of photography which was relatively widespread in the 1840s and 1850s.

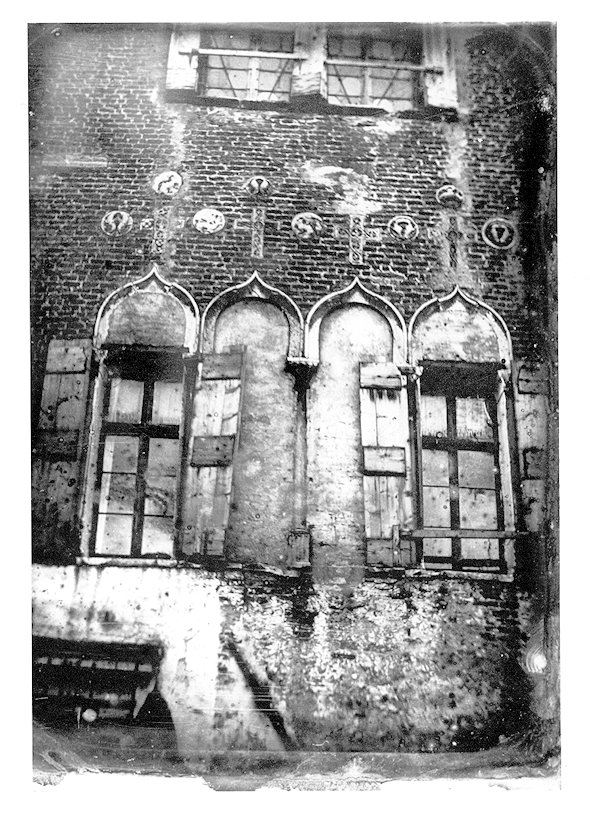
A daguerreotype

Ruskin was highly skilled at sketching, but he appears to have got his valet to take the daguerreotypes.

In 19th-century editions The Stones of Venice was mainly illustrated with engravings, presumably because of the limitations of printing technology at that time. However, in the 21st century it has been reprinted with original sketches.

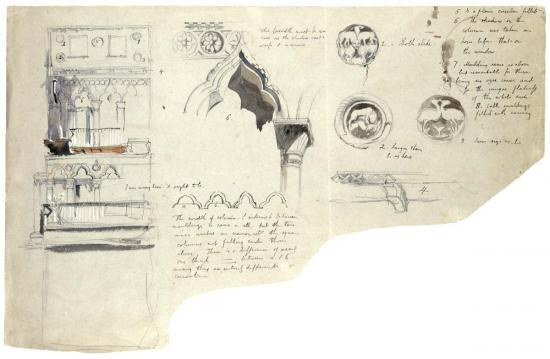
Sketch of an architectural detail made by John Ruskin for The Stones of Venice

=== Publication history ===
==== First editions ====
- The Stones of Venice. Volume the First. The Foundations, 1851, Smith, Elder & Co., London
- The Stones of Venice. Volume the Second. The Sea-stories, 1853, Smith, Elder & Co., London
- The Stones of Venice. Volume the Third. The Fall, 1853, Smith, Elder & Co., London

==== Shortened editions ====
Various shortened versions of the book have been published. Ruskin himself produced an adaptation of volume two “For Use of Travellers While Staying in Venice and Verona”, specifically designed as a practical guide for travellers. Two abridgements are by writers notable for their own guide books to Venice:

- Links: The Stones of Venice. Ruskin, John. J.G. Links, ed.

Originally published by Collins in 1960, this version is now available in Penguin Classics and other editions, see ISBN 978-0-306-81286-6

- Morris: The Stones of Venice (Introduced by Jan Morris)
  - Mount Kisco, New York: Moyer Bell Limited, 1989.
  - Folio Society edition, 2001.

Both editors tended to keep the descriptive elements of the book rather than the philosophical context, but Morris was more faithful to the intellectual underpinning of Ruskin's text.

== Reception ==
Ruskin's praise of Gothic architecture had a strong influence in the United Kingdom. An example which is often cited is that of the commissioning of the Wool Exchange in Bradford. Ruskin visited Bradford and told its citizens that they had not understood his message about the relation of architecture to society, but they still chose a Venetian Gothic design. William Morris, on the other hand, adopted Ruskin's call for a return to traditional craftsmanship and ethical production.

Ruskin had a strong influence on the French novelist Marcel Proust. His In Search of Lost Time has the narrator arrive in Venice with notebooks “to take notes for a work I was doing on Ruskin,” explicitly acknowledging the English critic's influence. However, Proust has an introspective approach to Venetian architecture, and is less interested in its historical and technical aspects than Ruskin.

== See also ==
- John Henry Devereux
