= Associationism =

Psychological concept

Associationism is the idea that mental processes operate by the association of one mental state with its successor states. It holds that all mental processes are made up of discrete psychological elements and their combinations, which are believed to be made up of sensations or simple feelings. In philosophy, this idea is viewed as the outcome of empiricism and sensationism. The concept encompasses a psychological theory as well as comprehensive philosophical foundation and scientific methodology.

== History ==
=== Early history ===
The idea is first recorded in Plato and Aristotle, especially with regard to the succession of memories. Particularly, the model is traced back to the Aristotelian notion that human memory encompasses all mental phenomena. The model was discussed in detail in the philosopher's work, Memory and Reminiscence. This view was then widely embraced until the emergence of British associationism, which began with Thomas Hobbes.

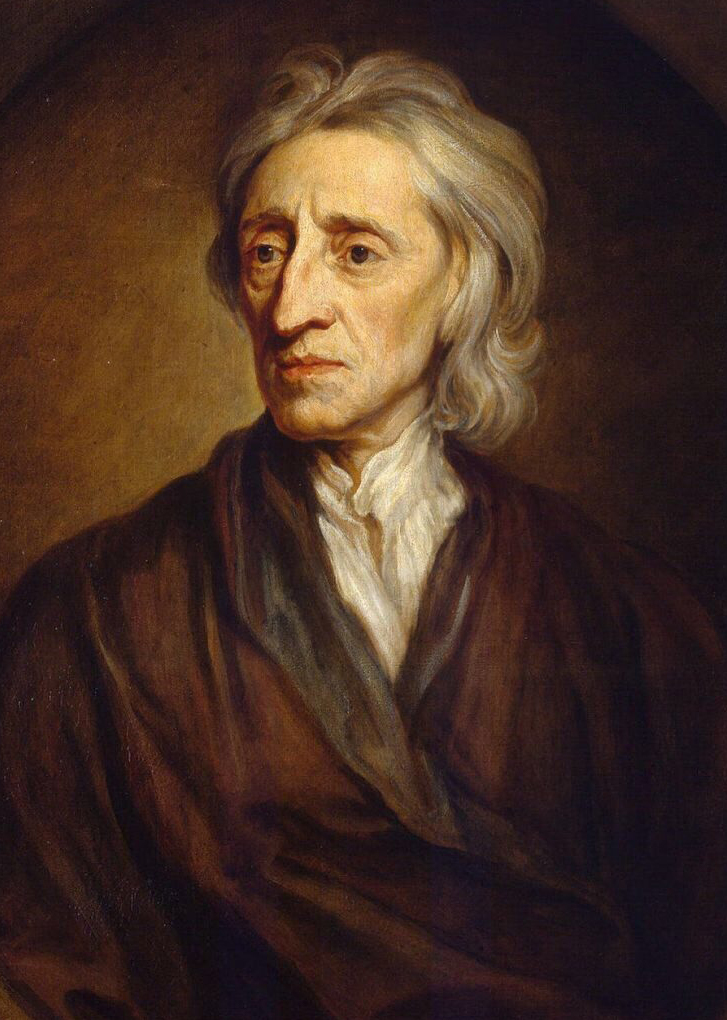
John Locke was the first person to use the phrase association of ideas.

=== Associationist School ===
Members of the Associationist School, including John Locke, David Hume, David Hartley, Joseph Priestley, James Mill, John Stuart Mill, Alexander Bain, and Ivan Pavlov, asserted that the principle applied to all or most mental processes.

==== John Locke ====
The phrase "association of ideas" was first used by John Locke in 1689. In chapter 33 of An Essay Concerning Human Understanding, which is entitled “Of the Association of Ideas″, he describes the ways that ideas can be connected to each other. He writes,

"Some of our ideas have a natural correspondence and connection with one another."

Although he believed that some associations were natural and justified, he believed that others were illogical, causing errors in judgment. He also explains that one can associate some ideas together based on their education and culture, saying, "there is another connection of ideas wholly owing to chance or custom". The term associationism later became more prominent in psychology and the psychologists who subscribed to the idea became known as "the associationists". Locke's view that the mind and body are two aspects of the same unified phenomenon can be traced back to Aristotle's ideas on the subject.

==== David Hume ====
In his 1740 book Treatise on Human Nature David Hume outlines three principles for ideas to be connected to each other: resemblance, continuity in time or place, and cause or effect. He argues that the mind uses these principles, rather than reason, to traverse from idea to idea. He writes “When the mind, therefore, passes from the idea or impression of one object to the idea or belief of another, it is not determined by reason, but by certain principles, which associate together the ideas of these objects, and unite them in the imagination.” These connections are formed in the mind by observation and experience. Hume does not believe that any of these associations are “necessary’ in a sense that ideas or object are truly connected, instead he sees them as mental tools used for creating a useful mental representation of the world.

==== Later members ====
Later members of the school developed very specific principles elaborating how associations worked and even a physiological mechanism bearing no resemblance to modern neurophysiology. For a fuller explanation of the intellectual history of associationism and the "Associationist School", see Association of Ideas.

== Applications ==
Associationism is often concerned with middle-level to higher-level mental processes such as learning. For instance, the thesis, antithesis, and synthesis are linked in one's mind through repetition so that they become inextricably associated with one another. Among the earliest experiments that tested the applications of associationism, involve Hermann Ebbinghaus' work. He was considered the first experimenter to apply the associationist principles systematically, and used himself as subject to study and quantify the relationship between rehearsal and recollection of material.

Some of the ideas of the Associationist School also anticipated the principles of conditioning and its use in behavioral psychology. Both classical conditioning and operant conditioning use positive and negative associations as means of conditioning.

== See also ==
- Calculus of relations
- Connectionism
- Family resemblance
- Prototype theory
