= Joseph Priestley and education =

Aspect of Joseph Priestley's thought

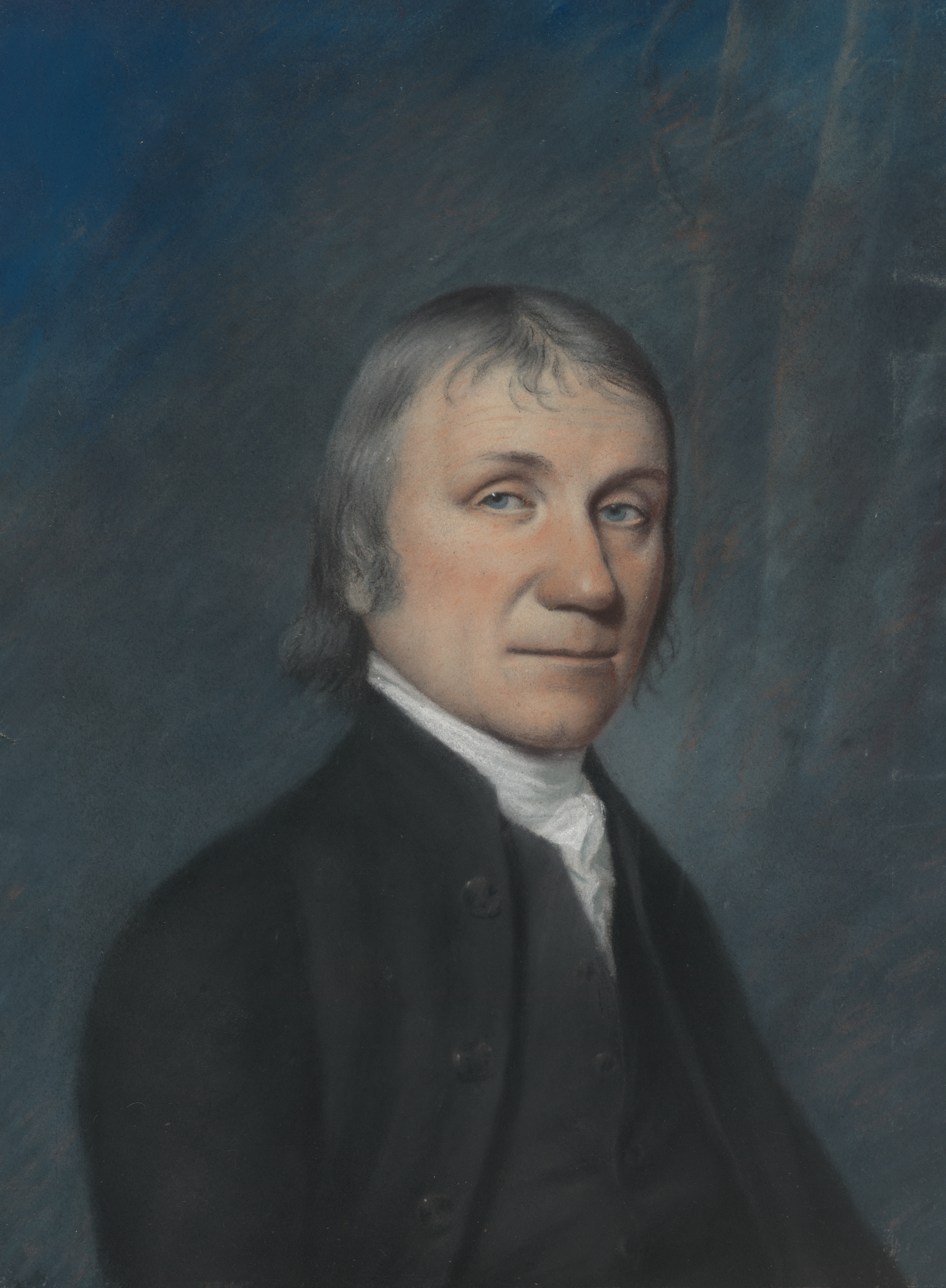
Priestley by James Sharples, c. 1797

Joseph Priestley (24 March [O.S. 13 March] 1733 – 8 February 1804) was a British natural philosopher, Dissenting clergyman, political theorist, and theologian. While his achievements in all of these areas are renowned, he was also dedicated to improving education in Britain; he did this on an individual level and through his support of the Dissenting academies. His grammar textbook was innovative and highly influential. More importantly, though, Priestley introduced a liberal arts curriculum at Warrington Academy, arguing that a practical education would be more useful to students than a classical one. He was also the first to advocate the study and teaching of modern history, an interest driven by his belief that humanity was improving and could bring about Christ's Millennium.

== Personal and institutional teaching ==
Priestley was a teacher in one way or another throughout his entire adult life. Once he discovered how much he enjoyed teaching, he consistently returned to this calling. At the school he established in Nantwich, Cheshire, he taught a wide range of topics to the town's children: Latin (and perhaps Greek), geography, mathematics, and English grammar. Unusually for the time, he also taught natural philosophy. Following the success of this school, he was offered the position of tutor of modern languages and rhetoric at Warrington Academy. In later years, when he lived in Leeds and Birmingham, he created classes for the youth of his parishes; in Birmingham his three classes totalled 150 students and he helped organise the New Meeting Sunday schools for the poor.

Having received an excellent education at Daventry, a Dissenting academy, and convinced that education was the key to shaping people and the world's future, Priestley continued to support the Dissenting academies throughout his life. For example, he advised the founders of New College at Hackney on its curriculum and preached a charity sermon on the "proper Objects of Education" to help raise money for the school. After emigrating to America in 1794, Priestley continued the educational projects that had always been important to him. He attempted to find funding for the Northumberland Academy and donated his library to it, but the academy did not open until 1813 and closed soon after. He communicated with Thomas Jefferson regarding the proper organisation of a university and when Jefferson founded the University of Virginia, it was Priestley's curricular principles that dominated the school. Jefferson also passed Priestley's advice on to Bishop James Madison, whose College of William & Mary also followed Priestley's maxims.

Wherever Priestley went, he also instructed people in natural philosophy. In Nantwich, he bought scientific instruments, such as a microscope, for the school, and encouraged his students to give public presentations of their experiments. In Calne, where he was a tutor to the son of Lord Shelburne, Priestley convinced his patron to buy expensive equipment with which to teach his son the fundamentals of natural philosophy. He wrote in his Miscellaneous Observations relating to Education (1778), published during these years, that children should not only be educated in the ancient subjects of rhetoric and grammar but should also become acquainted with science early in their lives since scientific understanding underpins the progress of the human race.

After Priestley moved to Birmingham in 1780, he encouraged the town's children to play with his apparatus and ask questions about his laboratory: the Priestley home became a place of scientific education for the town's children. Priestley's rain gauge and "perambulator" (a wheelbarrow for recording distances) delighted them. The boys often played with his air-gun, aiming at a wig of Priestley's which he had fastened to a post. Priestley designed magic lantern shows for them and shocked them with his electrical machine.

== Educational philosophy ==
In 1765, Priestley dedicated his Essay on a Course of Liberal Education for Civil and Active Life (1765), to the governing board of Warrington Academy. In it he argues that young people's education should anticipate their practical needs, something he accused the current universities, Dissenting and Establishment alike, of failing to do. In Priestley's eyes, the contemporary focus on a traditional classical education prevented students from acquiring useful skills. This principle of utility guided his unusual curricular recommendations. He proposed that students study English and the modern languages instead of the classical languages, learn practical mathematics, read modern rather than ancient history, and study the constitution and laws of England. He believed that these topics would prepare his students for the commercial middle-class life that most of them would live; he did not believe that the poor should receive this same education, arguing "it could be of no service to their country, and often a real detriment to themselves." In 1766 Warrington Academy replaced its old classical curriculum with Priestley's new liberal arts model. Some scholars of education have argued that this work and his later Miscellaneous Observations relating to Education (1778) (often reprinted with the Essay on Education) made Priestley the "most considerable English writer on educational philosophy" between John Locke and Herbert Spencer.

== Grammar ==
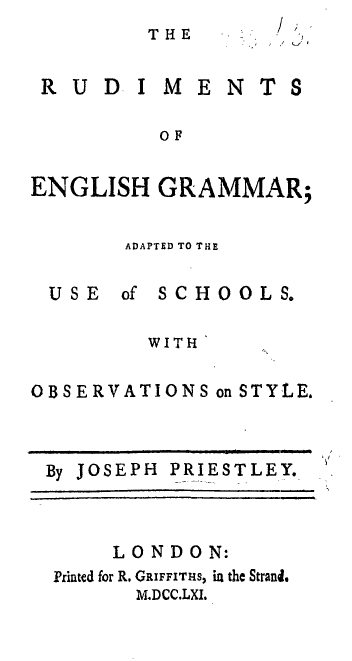
Title page from the first edition of Priestley's Rudiments (1761)

Priestley's first successful educational venture was the establishment of a local school in Nantwich. Believing that all students should have a good grasp of the English language and its grammar before learning any other language and dismayed at the quality of the instruction manuals available, Priestley wrote his own textbook: The Rudiments of English Grammar (1761). The book was very successful—it was reprinted for over fifty years. Its humour may have contributed to its popularity; for example, Priestley illustrated the couplet with this rhyme:

Beneath this stone my wife doth lie:
She's now at rest, and so am I.

Priestley also quoted from the most famous English authors, encouraging the middle-class association between reading and pleasure, a reading that would also, Priestley hoped, foster morality. Priestley's innovations in the teaching and description of English grammar, particularly his efforts to disassociate it from Latin grammar, made his textbook revolutionary and have led twentieth-century scholars to describe him as "one of the great grammarians of his time." Rudiments influenced all of the major grammarians of the late eighteenth century: Robert Lowth, James Harris, John Horne Tooke and even the American Noah Webster. The resounding success of Priestley's book was one of the reasons that Warrington Academy offered him a teaching position in 1761.

== History ==
Priestley's philosophy was founded on the fervent belief that a thorough understanding of history was necessary not only to worldly success but also to spiritual growth. He wrote: "my view was, not merely to make history intelligible to persons who may choose to read it for amusement, but . . . to facilitate its subserviency to the highest uses to which it can be applied: to contribute to its forming the able statesman and the intelligent and useful citizen." His abiding interest in history, particularly modern history, sets Priestley apart from his contemporaries. Priestley was the first person to advocate the serious study of modern history; no other British university was teaching the subject at the time and Oxford would not begin until 1841.

While at Warrington Academy, Priestley gave a series of lectures on history and government; in 1788 he finally published them as Lectures on History and General Policy. They cover a wide array of topics—"forms of government, the feudal system, the rise of corporations, law, agriculture, commerce, the arts, finance and taxation, colonies, manners, population, war and peace"—demonstrating how all-encompassing Priestley believed the study of history to be. In this text, he narrates a version of history in which all events are "an exhibition of the ways of God;" studying history and nature, according to Priestley, "leads us to the knowledge of his perfections and of his will." Understanding history thus allows one to comprehend the natural laws God established and the perfection towards which they allow the world to tend. This millennial outlook is tied together with Priestley's belief in scientific progress and the improvement of the human race. Priestley maintained that each age improves upon the previous one and studying history allows people to see and participate in that progress. In his Essay on the First Principles of Government (1768) he writes:

Highly as we think of the wisdom of our ancestors we justly think of ourselves, of the present age, wiser and . . . must see that we can . . . improve upon institutions that have been transmitted to us. Let us not doubt but that every generation in posterity will be as much superior to us in political, and all kinds of knowledge, and that they will be able to improve upon the best civil and religious institutions that we can prescribe for them. [Priestley's emphasis]

This millennial conception of history was in direct contrast to the two dominant historical paradigms of the time: Edward Gibbon's decline narrative found in his Decline and Fall of the Roman Empire and David Hume's cyclical narrative found in his History of England.

Unlike Gibbon and Hume, Priestley did not limit himself to narrating a version of history in these Lectures; he also presented a method for historical research and was one of the first to argue for the primacy of original documents in the study of history. He also contended that much could be learned from "material evidence" of former civilisations, such as "ancient coins, medals and inscriptions," as well as "exchequer rolls, public and private ledger books, letters, diaries, monetary, financial and exchange systems, systems of fortifications and city plans . . . [in addition to] ballads and works of fiction." The book was well received and was employed by many educational institutions, such as the Dissenting academy at Hackney, Brown, Princeton, Yale and Cambridge.

The theory underpinning Priestley's millennial view of history and his educational philosophy, was David Hartley's theory of association. Hartley's associationism, an expansion of John Locke's theories in Essay Concerning Human Understanding (1690) and laid out in Observations on Man (1749), postulated that the human mind operated according to natural laws and that the most important law for the formation of the self was "associationism." For Hartley, associationism was a physical process: vibrations in the physical world travelled through the nerves attached to people's sense organs and ended up in their brains. The brain connected the vibrations of whatever sensory input it was receiving with whatever feelings or ideas that the brain was simultaneously "thinking." These "associations" were impossible to avoid, formed as they were simply by experiencing the world; they were also the foundation of a person's character. Locke famously warns against letting "a foolish maid" convince a child that "goblins and sprites" are associated with the darkness, for "darkness shall ever afterwards bring with it those frightful ideas, and they shall be so joined, that he can no more bear the one than the other." Associationism provided the scientific basis for Priestley's belief that man is "perfectible" and served as the foundation for all of his pedagogical innovations.

Because Priestley viewed education as one of the primary forces shaping a person's character as well as the basis of morality, he, unusually for his time, promoted the education of women. Alluding to the language of Locke's Essay Concerning Human Understanding, he wrote: "certainly, the minds of women are capable of the same improvement, and the same furniture, as those of men." He argued that if women were to care for children and be intellectually stimulating companions for their husbands, they had to be well-educated. Although Priestley advocated education for middle-class women, he did not extend this logic to the poor.

=== Charts of biography and history ===
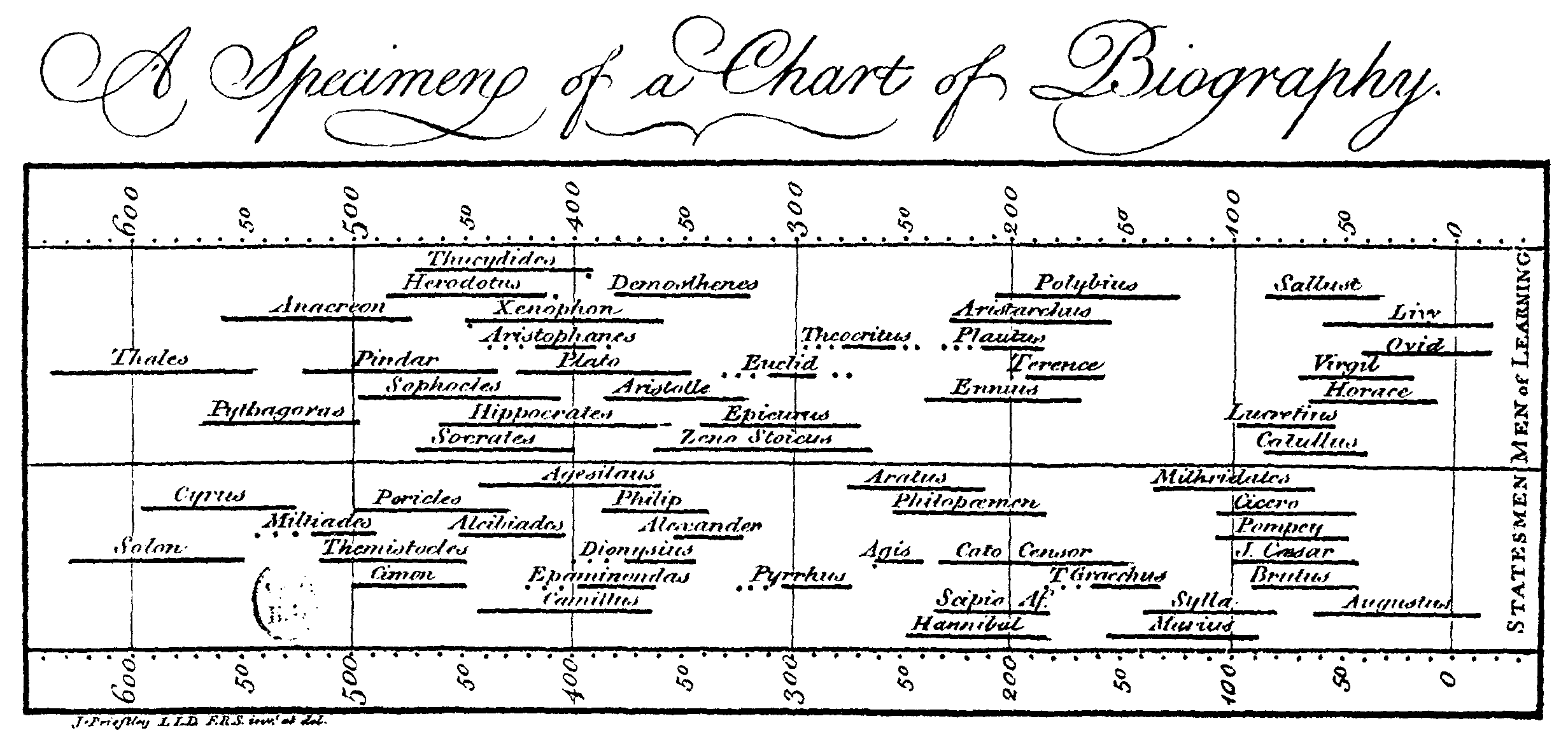
A redacted version of Priestley's Chart of Biography (1765)

As a supplement to his lectures on history, Priestley also designed and published A Chart of Biography (1765) and a New Chart of History (1769) (which he dedicated to Benjamin Franklin). These charts and their accompanying Descriptions would allow students, Priestley said, to "trace out distinctly the dependence of events to distribute them into such periods and divisions as shall lay the whole claim of past transactions in a just and orderly manner."

The Chart of Biography covers a vast timespan, from 1200 BC to 1800 AD, and includes two thousand names. Priestley organised his list into six categories: Statesman and Warriors; Divines and Metaphysicians; Mathematicians and Physicians (natural philosophers were placed here); Poets and Artists; Orators and Critics (prose fiction authors were placed here); and Historians and Antiquarians (lawyers were placed here). Priestley's "principle of selection" was fame, not merit; therefore, as he mentions, the chart is a reflection of current opinion. He also wanted to ensure that his readers would recognise the entries on the chart. Priestley had difficulty assigning his all of his people to individual categories; he attempted to list them in the category under which their most important work had been done. Machiavelli is therefore listed as a historian rather than a statesman and Cicero is listed as a statesman instead of an orator. The chart was also arranged in order of importance; "statesmen are placed on the lower margin, where they are easier to see, because they are the names most familiar to readers."

The Chart of History lists events in 106 separate locations; it illustrates Priestley's belief that the entire world's history was significant, a relatively new development in the eighteenth century, which had begun with Voltaire and William Robertson. The world's history is divided up into the following geographical categories: Scandinavia, Poland, Russia, Great Britain, Spain, France, Italy, Turkey in Europe, Turkey in Asia, Germany, Persia, India, China, Africa and America. Priestley aimed to show the history of empires and the passing of power; the subtitle of the Description that accompanied the chart was "A View of the Principle Revolutions of Empire that have taken place in the World" and he wrote that:

The capital use [of the Charts was as] a most excellent mechanical help to the knowledge of history, impressing the imagination indelibly with a just image of the rise, progress, extent, duration, and contemporary state of all the considerable empires that have ever existed in the world.

As Arthur Sheps in his article about the Charts explains, "the horizontal line conveys an idea of the duration of fame, influence, power and domination. A vertical reading conveys an impression of the contemporaneity of ideas, events and people. The number or density of entries . . . tells us about the vitality of any age." Voids in the chart indicated intellectual Dark Ages, for example. Both Charts were popular for decades—the A New Chart of History went through fifteen editions by 1816. The trustees of Warrington were so impressed with Priestley's lectures and charts that they arranged for the University of Edinburgh to grant him a Doctor of Law degree in 1764.

== Religious education ==
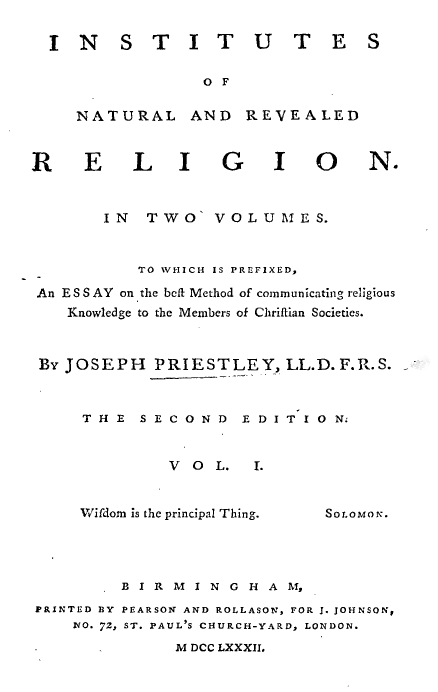
Title page from the second edition of Institutes of Natural and Revealed Religion

Priestley pondered what form the best religious education would take throughout his life. In the 1760s, when he was a student at Daventry Academy, he imbibed the pedagogical principles of its founder, Philip Doddridge; although he was dead, Doddridge's emphasis on academic rigour and freedom of thought lived on at the school and impressed Priestley. These ideals would always be a part of Priestley's educational programs. He began writing one of these while still at Daventry, the Institutes of Natural and Revealed Religion. However, he did not publish the work until 1772, when he was at Leeds. In an effort to increase and stabilise membership at his church there, he taught three religious education classes. He subdivided the young people of the congregation into three categories: young men from 18–30 to whom he taught "the elements of natural and revealed religion" (young women may or may not be included in this group); children under 14 to whom he taught "the first elements of religious knowledge by way of a short catechism in the plainest and most familiar language possible"; and "an intermediate class" to whom he taught "knowledge of the Scriptures only." Unlike the later Sunday schools established by Robert Raikes, Priestley aimed his classes at middle-class Rational Dissenters; he wanted to teach them "the principles of natural religion and the evidences and doctrine of revelation in a regular and systematic course," something their parents could not provide.

Priestley wrote texts for the courses he envisioned: A Catechism for Children and Young Persons (1767), which went through eleven English-language editions; and A Scripture Catechism, consisting of a Series of Questions, with References to the Scriptures instead of Answers (1772), which went through six British editions by 1817. He aimed to write non-sectarian Catechisms, but in this he failed. He offended many orthodox readers by focusing on God's benevolence instead of on Adam's sin and Christ's atonement. Priestley implemented this same system of religious instruction over a decade later in Birmingham, when he became a minister at New Meeting.

== Bibliography ==
For a complete bibliography of Priestley's works, see the list of works by Joseph Priestley.

- Gibbs, F. W. Joseph Priestley: Adventurer in Science and Champion of Truth. London: Thomas Nelson and Sons, 1965.
- Jackson, Joe, A World on Fire: A Heretic, An Aristocrat and the Race to Discover Oxygen. New York: Viking, 2005. ISBN 0-670-03434-7.
- McLachlan, John. Joseph Priestley Man of Science 1733–1804: An Iconography of a Great Yorkshireman. Braunton and Devon: Merlin Books Ltd., 1983. ISBN 0-86303-052-1.
- McLachlan, John. "Joseph Priestley and the Study of History." Transactions of the Unitarian Historical Society 19 (1987–90): 252–63.
- Schofield, Robert E. The Enlightenment of Joseph Priestley: A Study of his Life and Work from 1733 to 1773. University Park: Pennsylvania State University Press, 1997. ISBN 0-271-01662-0.
- Schofield, Robert E. The Enlightened Joseph Priestley: A Study of His Life and Work from 1773 to 1804. University Park: Pennsylvania State University Press, 2004. ISBN 0-271-02459-3.
- Sheps, Arthur. "Joseph Priestley's Time Charts: The Use and Teaching of History by Rational Dissent in late Eighteenth-Century England." Lumen 18 (1999): 135–154.
- Thorpe, T.E. Joseph Priestley. London: J. M. Dent, 1906.
- Uglow, Jenny. The Lunar Men: Five Friends Whose Curiosity Changed the World. New York: Farrar, Straus and Giroux, 2002. ISBN 0-374-19440-8.
- Watts, R. "Joseph Priestley and education." Enlightenment and Dissent 2 (1983): 83–100.
