= Timeline =

Events displayed in chronological order

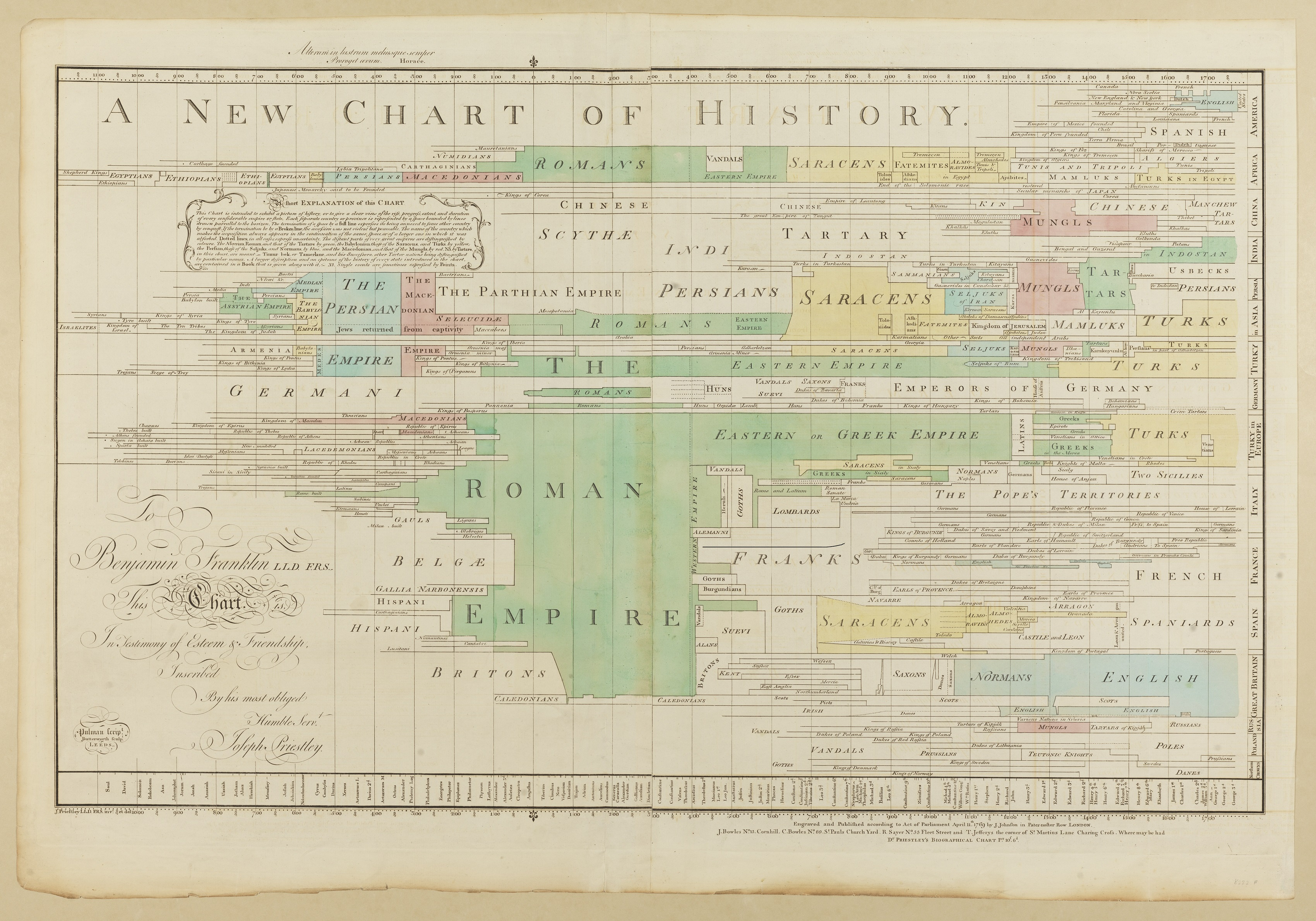
Joseph Priestley's A New Chart of History, 1765

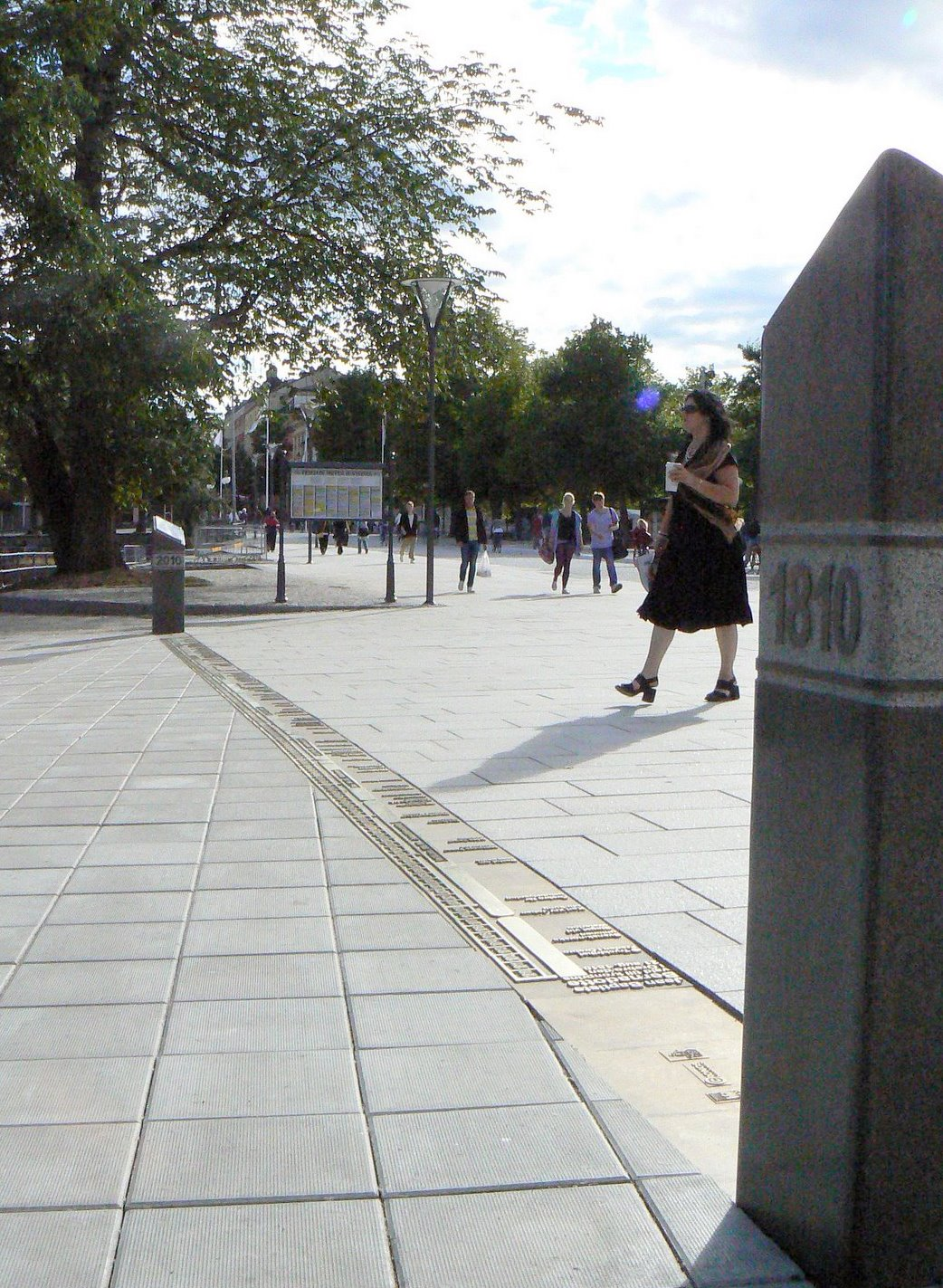
The bronze timeline "Fifteen meters of History" with background information board, Örebro, Sweden

A timeline is a list of events displayed in chronological order. It is typically a graphic design showing a long bar labelled with dates paralleling it, and usually contemporaneous events.

Timelines can use any suitable scale representing time, suiting the subject and data; many use a linear scale, in which a unit of distance is equal to a set amount of time. This timescale is dependent on the events in the timeline. A timeline of evolution can be over millions of years, whereas a timeline for the day of the September 11 attacks can take place over minutes, and that of an explosion over milliseconds. While many timelines use a linear timescale—especially where very large or small timespans are relevant -- logarithmic timelines entail a logarithmic scale of time; some "hurry up and wait" chronologies are depicted with zoom lens metaphors.

More usually, "timeline" refers merely to a data set which could be displayed as described above. For example, this meaning is used in the titles of many Wikipedia articles starting "Timeline of ..."

== History ==
Time and space are variously intertwined concepts. The line is ubiquitous in clocks in the form of a circle, time is spoken of in terms of length, intervals, a before and an after. The idea of orderly, segmented time is also represented in almanacs, calendars, charts, graphs, genealogical and evolutionary trees, where the line is central.

Originally, chronological events were arranged in a mostly textual form. This took form in annals, like king lists. Alongside them, the table was used like in the Greek tables of Olympiads and Roman lists of consuls and triumphs. Annals had little narrative and noted what happened to people, making no distinction between natural and human actions.

In Europe, from the 4th century, the dominant chronological notation was the table. This can be partially credited to Eusebius, who laid out the relations between Jewish, pagan, and Christian histories in parallel columns, culminating in the Roman Empire, according to the Christian view when Christ was born to spread salvation as far as possible. His work was widely copied and was among the first printed books. This served the idea of Christian world history and providential time. The table is easy to produce, append, and read with indices, so it also fit the Renaissance scholars' absorption of a wide variety of sources with its focus on commonalities. These uses made the table with years in one column and places of events (kingdoms) on the top the dominant visual structure of time.

By the 17th century, chronology and geography became the two sources of precise information for European early modern historians. In geography, Renaissance mapmakers updated Ptolemy's maps and the map became a symbol of the power of monarchs, and knowledge. Likewise, the idea that a singular chronology of world history from contemporary sources is possible affected historians. The want for precision in chronology gave rise to historical eclipses in tables, like in the case of Gerardus Mercator. Various graphical experiments emerged, from fitting the whole of history on a calendar year to series of historical drawings, in the hopes of making a metaphorical map of time. Developments in printing and engraving that made practical larger and more detailed book illustrations allowed these changes, but in the 17th century, the table with some modifications continued to dominate.

The modern timeline emerged in Joseph Priestley's A Chart of Biography, published in 1765. It presented dates simply and provided an analogue for the concept of historical progress that was becoming popular in the 18th century. However, as Priestley recognized, history is not totally linear. The table has the advantage in that it can present many of these intersections and branching paths. For Priestley, its main use was a "mechanical help to the knowledge of history", not as an image of history. Regardless, the timeline had become very popular during the 18th and 19th centuries. Positivism emerged in the 19th century and the development of chronophotography and tree ring analysis made visible time taking place at various speeds. This encouraged people to think that events might be truly objectively recorded.

However, in some cases, filling in a timeline with more data only pushed it towards impracticality. Jacques Barbeu-Duborg's 1753 Chronologie Universelle was mounted on a 54-feet-long (16½ m) scroll. Charles Joseph Minard's 1869 thematic map of casualties of the French army in its Russian campaign put much less focus on the one-directional line. Charles Renouvier's 1876 Uchronie, a branching map of the history of Europe, depicted both the actual course of history and counterfactual paths. At the end of the 19th century, Henri Bergson declared the metaphor of the timeline to be deceiving in Time and Free Will. The question of big history and deep time engendered estranging forms of the timeline, like in Olaf Stapledon's 1930 work Last and First Men where timelines are drawn on scales from the historical to the cosmological. Similar techniques are used by the Long Now Foundation, and the difficulties of chronological representation have been presented by visual artists including Francis Picabia, On Kawara, J. J. Grandville, and Saul Steinberg.

== Types ==
There are different types of timelines:

- Text timelines, labeled as text
- Number timelines, the labels are numbers, commonly line graphs
- Interactive, clickable, zoomable
- Video timelines

There are many methods to visualize timelines. Historically, timelines were static images and were generally drawn or printed on paper. Timelines relied heavily on graphic design, and the ability of the artist to visualize the data.

== Uses ==
Timelines are often used in education to help students and researchers with understanding the order or chronology of historical events and trends for a subject. To show time on a specific scale on an axis, a timeline can visualize time lapses between events, durations (such as lifetimes or wars), and the simultaneity or the overlap of spans and events.

=== In historical studies ===
Timelines are particularly useful for studying history, as they convey a sense of change over time. Wars and social movements are often shown as timelines. Timelines are also useful for biographies. Examples include:

- Timeline of the civil rights movement
- Timeline of European exploration
- Timeline of European imperialism
- Timeline of Solar System exploration
- Timeline of United States history
- Timeline of World War I
- List of timelines of World War II
- Timeline of religion

=== In natural sciences ===
Timelines are also used in the natural world and sciences, such as in astronomy, biology, chemistry, and geology:

- 2009 swine flu pandemic timeline
- Chronology of the universe
- Geologic time scale
- Timeline of the evolutionary history of life
- Timeline of crystallography

=== In project management ===
Another type of timeline is used for project management. Timelines help team members know what milestones need to be achieved and under what time schedule. An example is establishing a project timeline in the implementation phase of the life cycle of a computer system.

== Software ==
Timelines (no longer constrained by previous space and functional limitations) are now digital and interactive, generally created with computer software. Microsoft Encarta encyclopedia provided one of the earliest multimedia timelines intended for students and the general public. ChronoZoom is another example of interactive timeline software.

== See also ==
- Chronology
- ChronoZoom – an open source project for visualizing the timeline of Big History
- List of timelines
- Living graph
- Many-worlds interpretation
- Sequence of events
- Synchronoptic view
- Timecode
- Timestream
- Timelines of world history
- World line
