= John Gay (philosopher) =

English philosopher (1699–1745)

John Gay (1699–1745), a cousin of the poet John Gay, was an English philosopher, biblical scholar and Church of England clergyman. The greatest happiness principle, Gay supposed, represented a middle ground between the egoism of Hobbes and Hutcheson's moral sense theory.

== Education ==
Gay was educated at Torrington School and Blundell's School. In 1718 he was elected Blundell's Scholar at Sidney Sussex College, Cambridge, graduating B.A. in 1721/2 and M.A. in 1725. From 1724 to 1732 he was a Fellow of the College, lecturing in Hebrew, Greek, and ecclesiastical history.

== Philosophy ==
Gay's philosophical works argued that virtue was conforming to a rule of life which promotes the happiness of others. His short "Dissertation Concerning the Fundamental Principle of Virtue or Morality" was first published as a preface to Edmund Law's translation of William King's Latin Essay on the Origin of Evil (1731). (Law was Bishop of Carlisle and King was Archbishop of Dublin.) The "Dissertation" is one of the seminal works in the history of English utilitarianism. In the eighteenth century its influence may be found in the works of the theological utilitarians, Abraham Tucker (The Light of Nature Pursued, 7 vols., 1768–1778) and William Paley (Principles of Moral and Political Philosophy, 1785). David Hartley said that Gay's assertion of the importance of psychological association in human nature was the origin of his Observations on Man (1749).

In 1730 Gay resigned his fellowship and became Vicar of Wilshamstead, later adding the living of Haynes. He died on 18 July 1745, and was buried at Wilshamstead on 22 July.

== Family ==
He married Elizabeth; they had two sons and four daughters.

== Sources ==
- Philosophical Dictionary, Retrieved 15 December, 2010
- D. D. Raphael, British Moralists (Hackett, 1990)
- John Gay in Encyclopædia Britannica. Retrieved from Encyclopædia Britannica Online 15 December 2010
