= Theopathy =

Experience intense religious absorption

Theopathy (adj. theopathic/theopathetic, from Greek θεός, god, and πάθος, feeling, emotion, suffering) is a term that was probably first used in 1749 by David Hartley. Merriam Webster defines it as "experience or capacity for experience of the divine illumination, especially: intense absorption in religious devotion." In Hartley's philosophy, the term is used for a stage in human development, after sympathy with others, and before the "moral sense", signifying "annihilation of the self". Research on the influence of Hartley's philosophy on Wordsworth and Coleridge has confirmed a strong but critical reception.

Outside of Hartley's philosophy, the term "theopathic" was used for a mystic unity with god in French psychology. In English psychology, William James is said to have used "theopathy" and "theopathic" in the sense of a pathological excess of devotion. Louis Massignon used it in his works on lslamic sufi mysticism, translating shath as "theopathic locution".

== Definitions ==
The 1933 edition of the OED lists theopathy, theopathic and theopathetic as three entries, explaining the noun as "sympathetic passive feeling excited by the contemplation of god." The OED articles all refer to Hartley.

== David Hartley ==
David Hartley uses the term theopathy in his work Observations on Man, his Frame, his Duty, and his Expectations (first edition 1749). This work "presents an original model of psychological growth, which describes how the self both forms and transforms, as the person gains in 'sympathy' and 'theopathy'—put simply, learns to love, both others and God." Richard Allen's article on Hartley in the Stanford Encyclopaedia of Philosophy explains that theopathy means a stage in the spiritual and ethical development of man; theopathy follows sympathy, ultimately leading to the annihilation of self-will.

Sympathy and theopathy replace imagination and ambition as “primary pursuits,” the fundamental modes of experience and interaction. Hartley calls this reorienting transformation the “annihilation of self.” This “annihilation” is not quasi-mystical obliteration; rather, it is a reorientation toward, or discovery of, a higher self of sympathy, theopathy, and the moral sense. It involves liberation from what William Blake calls the “mind-forged manacles” of a self-created and self-regarding hell and an awakening to one’s true humanity.

Richard Haven shows that theopathy is presented as "perfect self-annihilation and the pure love of god". According to Haven, Hartley sees the world as revealing the qualities of god. The experience of this world will, "through the operation of psychological laws", ultimately lead to theopathy, "culminate" in it. Man's relationship to the supernatural is not outside nature and human consciousness but "intelligible in terms of the relationship of man to the natural".

== Reception ==
The impact of Hartley's concept was analysed for English literature, and influences can be found above all in Samuel Coleridge and William Wordsworth, e.g. in Coleridge's The Rime of the Ancient Mariner:

The moment of sympathy passes imperceptibly into the moment of theopathy .... After this, the Mariner is left to the ministries of the invisible spirits of heaven and sea, spirits he has once feared but now regards with an intermediate love... Hope and the joy which properly accompanies it pour over him at the sight of the hermit who will shrive him. When he is thus reconciled to God's mercy, the Mariner concerns himself with duty.

In Richard Haven's analysis, Coleridge found Hartley's theory useful because it presented mysticism in a rationalized form. Otherwise he would have felt to be a "mere enthusiast". The relationship between the natural and the supernatural worlds are seen as one between two states of mind.

Unlike Haven, Hoxie N. Fairchild, in his article on Hartley, Pistorius and Coleridge, shows how Coleridge, influenced by Hermann Andreas Pistorius, did not see a black-and-white dichotomy between rationalism and mystical union with God. In explaining the idea of a union with god in his poem Religious Musings Coleridge himself made a reference to Hartley and his commentator Hermann Andreas Pistorius. "Freed from the charge of mysticism", is the reason reason given by Coleridge himself for his preference of Hartley over mystical authors, and Fairchild concludes: "Hartley, five years later to be spurned as the mechanistic foe of religion, is here cited as authority for what is perhaps the most explicitly mystical passage in the poem." Yet Coleridge's firstborn son, Ernest Hartley, named after Hartley, mentioned that his father had read Hartley's main work relying on Pistorius's comments in the 1791 editions. Fairchild recognises that "the tradition of sensationalism and associationism, even when combined with the doctrine of necessity, had a quasi-mysticism of its own; that not merely the outer world of Newton but the inner world of Locke seemed to provide opportunities for union with the godhead". This is why there cannot be a black-and-white contrast between rationalism and mysticism, which has often been seen in Coleridge's (and Wordsworth's) stance. According to Fairchild, Pistorius in the note on Hartley read by Coleridge to comment on his poem "somewhat clarified Hartley's meaning, especially as regards the dependence of the pure love of God and self-annihilation upon the associational mechanism,". This concept, however, lost its appeal to Coleridge later on, when he turned to the very German mysticism that he had previously rejected as "dear, gorgeous nonsense".

Robert Brainard Pearsall sees Wordsworth' s worldview based on David Hartley's philosophy and finds its expression in The Prelude, The Excursion, and in "a full hundred of his shorter poems". He concludes: "Hartley's system makes up the bone structure of Wordsworth's compositions." Pearsall explains theopathy as "awareness of god" and points out that Wordsworth modified Hartley's system in four aspects, one of which is his understanding that God is rather seen as external to the personality. Melvin Rader comes to a similar conclusion. He partly agrees with a study by Arthur Beatty, that The Prelude is "deeply affected by the associational psychology". Yet, in Raders's view, Wordsworth's "deepest allegiance" was to a mystical philosophy. Rader writes: "I have no doubt that he found the language of associationism very useful in describing 'the growth of a poet's mind'; for mysticism has no language of its own; it has always insisted upon the ineffability of truth."

== Usage outside of Hartley's work ==
According to Michael A. Conway, the term "theopathic state" was used by Henri Delacroix to characterise "the living sense of the presence of God in the soul, ... which is to be differentiated from psychosis". Supposedly, it was later borrowed by Jean Baruzi from Delacroix. Maurice Blondel once described Baruzi's term as "expressive", but rather used other terms for his conceptualisation of mystical union.

Louis Massignon uses the term, especially the compound theopathic locution, in his Essay On the Origin of the Technical Language of Islamic Mysticism. Benjamin Clark, who translated Carl W. Ernst's Words of Ecstasy in Sufism into English, analyses the background of Massignon's use of the term. According to Clark, Massignon used the term theopathic locution to denote "a positive state of dialogical mental intermittance, which suddenly reveals to the isolated soul the supernatural visitation of a transcendent Interlocutor." In his translation of Massignon's work, Clark refers to William James who, as he supposes, used theopathy and theopathic in The Varieties of Religious Experience (1902) in a critical sense, denoting an excessive form of religious devotion. Clark explains Massignon had been aware of writers of English in the nineteenth century who had been using "theopathy” and “theopathic” in discussions of Sufism. As to shath, Clark states: "Islamic mystics in the highest form of shath were given not inarticulate feeling but speech, which they often used in their public teachings and sermons. They received true shath, as Massignon saw it, sometimes in ecstasy, always in a "theopathetic” state.

Evelyn Underhill uses the derivative theopathetic in her work Mysticism: A Study in Nature and Development of Spiritual Consciousness. With reference to Attars Allegory of the Valleys in The Conference of the Birds, she comments:

”The final stage is ...The Valley of Annihilation of Self: the supreme degree of union or theopathetic state, in which the self is utterly merged “like a fish in the sea” in the ocean of Divine Love.

== See also ==
- Fana (Sufism)
- Union with God

== Bibliography ==
- David Hartley: Observations on Man, his Frame, his Duty, and his Expectations, 2 Bde., Bath and London, Samuel Richardson Verlag, 1749
- Richard Allen: David Hartley on Human Nature. State University of New York , July 1, 1999. ISBN 978-0791442333
- Dorothy Waples: David Hartley in ‘The Ancient Mariner. In: The Journal of English and Germanic Philology, Bd. 35, Nr. 3, 1936, S. 337–51
- Richard Haven: Coleridge, Hartley, and the Mystics, Journal of the History of Ideas, Band 20, 1959
- Evelyn Underhill: Mysticism: A Study of the Nature and Development of Man's Spiritual Consciousness (1911). Twelfth edition published by E. P. Dutton in 1930. Republished by Dover Publications in 2002 (ISBN 978-0-486-42238-1). See also online editions at Christian Classics Ethereal Library and at Wikisource
- Ernst, Carl W.: Words of Ecstasy in Sufism. SUNY Press. ISBN 978-0-87395-917-9.
- Louis Massignon: Essay on the Origins of the Technical Language of Islamic Mysticism, translated from the French with an introduction by Benjamin Clark. Foreword by Herbert Mason. University of Notre Dame Press, Notre Dame, Indiana 1997.
