= Joanna Stephens =

18th-century British medical inventor

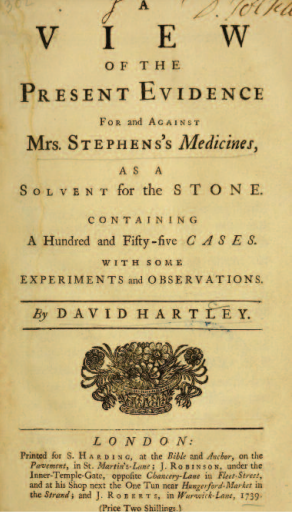
- David Hartley’s review of Joanna Stephens’s Medicines
- Born: c. 1710; Berkshire
- Died: August 6, 1774 (aged 63–64); Hammersmith
- Other names: Mrs Stephens
- Occupation: herbalist
- Known for: inventor of a medicine for bladder stones

Joanna Stephens or Mrs. Stephens (? – 6 August 1774) was a British inventor of a medicine for bladder stones. After proving its efficacy, she was paid £5,000 for revealing the recipe by the British parliament. Her remedy was used and analysed in England and in France. Investigations inspired by her work may have been a basis for development of modern biochemistry.

== Life ==
Stephens (possibly born in 1710) was the granddaughter of a doctor who authored several publications on remedies and grew up in a wealthy family in Berkshire, England. In her youth, she took care of herself by concocting remedies that she distributed free of charge to people in straitened circumstances. After the painful death of a close friend from kidney stones, she particularly devoted herself to the remedies for the condition. Having discovered by chance a recipe which seemed to aid the dissolution of the stone in the bladder and in the kidneys, she began to prepare and distribute it, while regularly transforming its composition by an empirical approach from 1720, and this for 15 years.

== Recognition of "Mrs Stephens' Remedy" ==
At the beginning of the 18th century, stones in the kidneys and bladder were treated with surgery, the stomach was opened at the level of the stone in order to remove it. Such an operation, lithotomy, was dangerous. Many oral remedies aimed at dissolving or breaking up stones were proposed by lay people, but none demonstrated sufficient results.

However, after its many transformations, the final recipe by Joanna Stephens, who then left Berkshire for Westminster, London acquired a certain fame. Testimonials of patients cured by her remedy were published in journals including The Gentleman's Magazine, and attracted the attention of two doctors who had themselves have been cured following a course of Stephens' remedy, including Dr. David Hartley, who became her strongest supporter.

Hartley thought Stephens had developed a lithontriptic, an oral medicine that would dissolve a stone in situ. He published Ten Cases of Persons who have Taken Mrs. Stephens’s Medicines for the Stone in 1738, which included an unsparing account of his own agonies. To make a proprietary medicine freely available to the public, Hartley convinced Parliament to pay Stephens £5,000 for her secret recipe.

It was proposed that a reward of £5,000 (a very substantial sum for the time) be given to Stephens so that she would make the recipe public to benefit as many people as possible. A private collection organised by the Gentleman's Magazine raised £1,356 3s, but Stephens refused to accept this reduced figure.

== Parliament reward and publication ==
Stephens was advised to petition the British Parliament for the missing amount. Parliament agreed to pay the reward if the recipe was publicly published and tests made confirmed her claims. Stephens agreed to share the recipe with the Archbishop of Canterbury and he arranged for the medicine to be prepared. Four patients were found who had suffered for at least a year and 28 doctors, scientists and politicians were asked to consider the results. All of the patients reported improvements and only two of the reviewers were unconvinced. £5,000 was offered to Stephens and her recipe was published on 16 June 1739 in The London Gazette, entitled "A most excellent cure for stone and gravel" (subsequently published in paperback)

The remedy was, among other things, composed of charred eggshells, charred snails and Alicante soap.

== European fame ==
The fame of Joanna Stephens and her remedy extended to Germany and France where, called the "English remedy", it was also examined by the Royal Academy of Sciences. The cure was published at length in Germany in Vossische Zeitung in 1739 noting the £5,000 reward and its acclaim in Britain.

It was widely used in France from 1740 until the Revolution of 1789.

In France, Dr. Morand, having been involved in the tests, established that the remedy seemed to work particularly well on people aged 65 to 79, seemed ineffective on children and did not work on all kinds of stones. The French chemist Antoine Baumé reported that Jean Hossard had simplified the recipe ""the remedy consists of a powder, an herbal tea, soapy balls and soapy pills". The ingredients consist mainly of charred whole snails (preferably prepared in the months of May, June and July), charred eggshells and Alicante soap, but also honey, aromatic and medicinal herbs, roots and fruit."

== Death ==
Joanna Stephens disappeared from public life after receiving her prize in 1740 and settled in Brook-green, Hammersmith. She died there, on 6 August 1774.

== Posterity ==
Stephens is today accused of charlatanism, even of having committed the biggest fraud in Parliament's history. However, some sources maintain that her remedy, although not meeting current scientific criteria, should nevertheless demonstrated some effectiveness. Moreover this discovery may have inspired others to find even better cures and been a basis for development of biochemistry.
