= Lectures on History and General Policy =

Published version of lectures on history and government given by Joseph Priestley

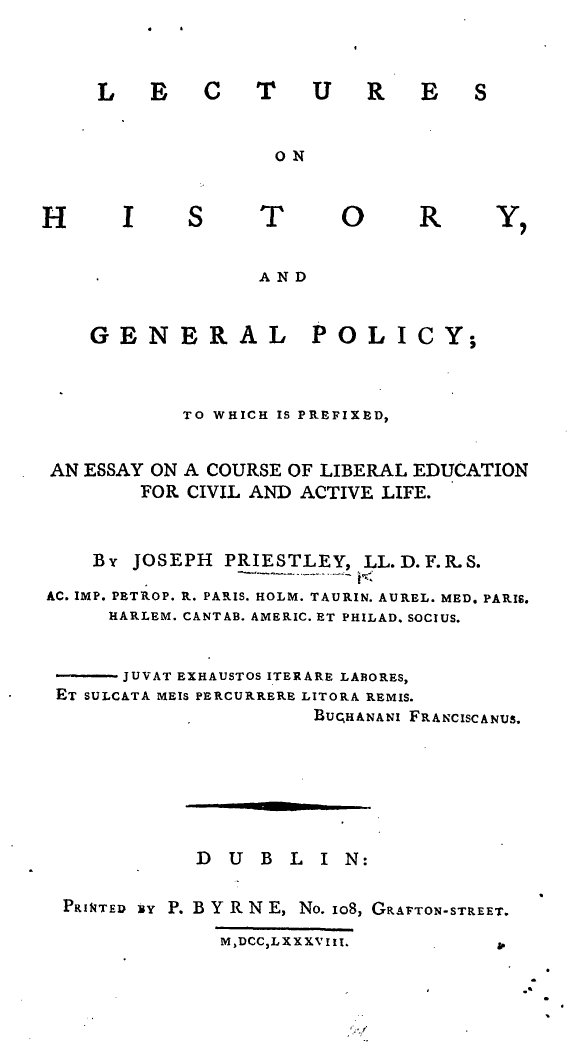
Title page from Joseph Priestley's Lectures

Lectures on History and General Policy (1788) is the published version of a set of lectures on history and government given by the 18th-century British polymath Joseph Priestley to the students of Warrington Academy.

The Lectures cover an array of topics—"forms of government, the feudal system, the rise of corporations, law, agriculture, commerce, the arts, finance and taxation, colonies, manners, population, war and peace"—demonstrating how all-encompassing Priestley believed the study of history to be. Priestley offers a version of history in which all events are "an exhibition of the ways of God;" studying history and nature, according to Priestley, "leads us to the knowledge of his perfections and of his will." Understanding history thus allows one to comprehend the natural laws God established and the perfection towards which they allow the world to tend. This millennial outlook is tied together with Priestley's belief in scientific progress and the improvement of the human race. Priestley maintained that each age improves upon the previous and studying history allows people to see and participate in that progress. Priestley's millennial conception of history was in direct contrast to the two dominant historical paradigms of the time: Edward Gibbon's declinism found in the Decline and Fall of the Roman Empire and David Hume's cyclical narrative found in his History of England.

The philosophical underpinning of Priestley's millennial view of history was David Hartley's theory of association laid out in Observations on Man (1749). Hartley's associationism, an expansion of John Locke's theories in Essay Concerning Human Understanding (1690, postulated that the human mind operated according to natural laws and that the most important law for the formation of the self was "associationism." For Hartley, associationism was a physical process: vibrations in the physical world travelled through the nerves attached to people's sense organs and ended up in their brains. The brain connected the vibrations of whatever sensory input it was receiving with whatever feelings or ideas that the brain was simultaneously "thinking." These "associations" were impossible to avoid, formed as they were simply by experiencing the world; they were also the foundation of a person's character. Locke famously warns against letting "a foolish maid" convince a child that "goblins and sprites" are associated with the darkness, for "darkness shall ever afterwards bring with it those frightful ideas, and they shall be so joined, that he can no more bear the one than the other." Associationism provided the scientific basis for Priestley's belief that man is "perfectible" and served as the foundation for all of his pedagogical innovations.

Because Priestley viewed education as one of the primary forces shaping a person's character as well as the basis of morality, he, unusually for his time, promoted the education of women. Alluding to the language of Locke's Essay Concerning Human Understanding, he wrote: "certainly, the minds of women are capable of the same improvement, and the same furniture, as those of men." He argued that if women were to care for children and be intellectually stimulating companions for their husbands, they had to be well-educated. Although Priestley advocated education for middle-class women, he did not extend this logic to the poor.

Priestley also presented a method for historical research and was one of the first to argue for the primacy of original documents in the study of history. He contended that much could be learned from "material evidence" of former civilisations, such as "ancient coins, medals and inscriptions," as well as "exchequer rolls, public and private ledger books, letters, diaries, monetary, financial and exchange systems, systems of fortifications and city plans . . . [in addition to] ballads and works of fiction."

Lectures was well received and was employed by many educational institutions, such as the Dissenting academy at Hackney, Brown, Princeton, Yale and Cambridge.

== Bibliography ==
- McLachlan, John. "Joseph Priestley and the Study of History." Transactions of the Unitarian Historical Society 19 (1987–90): 252–63.
- Schofield, Robert E. The Enlightened Joseph Priestley: A Study of His Life and Work from 1773 to 1804. University Park: Pennsylvania State University Press, 2004. ISBN 0-271-02459-3.
- Sheps, Arthur. "Joseph Priestley's Time Charts: The Use and Teaching of History by Rational Dissent in late Eighteenth-Century England." Lumen 18 (1999): 135–154.
- Watts, R. "Joseph Priestley and education." Enlightenment and Dissent 2 (1983): 83–100.
