= Jacques Barbeu-Dubourg =

French physician, botanist, writer, translator and publisher (1709–1779)

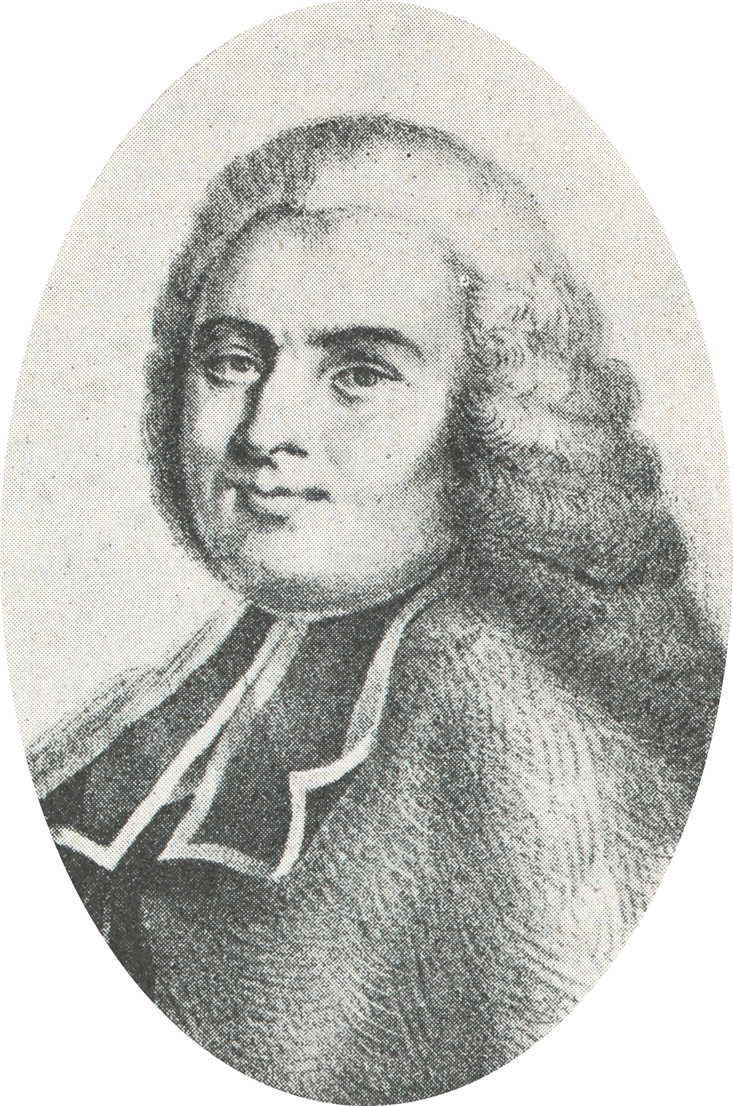
- Born: 12 February 1709 present-day Mayenne, France
- Died: 14 December 1779 (Age 70); Paris, France
- Occupations: Physician, botanist, writer, translator and publisher

Jacques Barbeu-Dubourg (12 February 1709 – 14 December 1779) was a French physician, botanist, writer, translator and publisher known for translating Benjamin Franklin's work into French and for inventing a gentlemen's umbrella fitted with a lightning conductor. He designed a method of histographic visualizations which he called the Carte chronographique.

== Life ==
He first embarked on theological studies, but abandoned this to devote his life to science. He studied medicine in Paris and obtained a doctorate in 1748.

He was a keen follower of the work of Benjamin Franklin, and they maintained a regular friendly correspondence. He translated some of Franklin's early experimental work into French in 1762 and published it in Gazette d'Epidaure, his medical journal. He went on to publish his French translation of Franklin's Observations and Experiments in 1773. Barbeu-Dubourg's "umbrella-lightning rod", an umbrella fitted with a tall spike and trailing chain, was designed to give the same protection for gentlemen as was sought by ladies of the time who wore lightning conductors on their hats.

Barbeu-Dubourg was a member of the Royal Society of Medicine in Paris, the Medical Society of London and the American Philosophical Society of Philadelphia. He wrote numerous books and papers, including:

- Chronographie, ou Description des tems, contenant toute la suite des souverains de l'univers et des principaux événements de chaque siècle... (Paris, 1753), one of the most ambitious of the chronographic charts produced during that period. The chart was 54 feet long, and mounted on an apparatus with scrolls and cranks to allow the reader to move freely through world history, a device which Barbeu-Dubourg called a "chronographic machine".
- Gazette d'Épidaure, ou Recueil de nouvelles de médecine avec des réflexions pour simplifier la théorie et éclairer la pratique (Paris, 1762)
- ''Le Botaniste françois, comprenant toutes les plantes communes et usuelles... (two volumes, Paris, 1767)
- Petit Code de la raison humaine, ou Exposition succincte de ce que la raison dicte à tous les hommes pour éclairer leur conduite et assurer leur bonheur (Paris, 1789)

During the American Revolution the French government appointed Barbeu-Dubourg to act as secret intermediary to offer support to the Americans, but he was soon deemed unsuitable for the task and replaced by Beaumarchais. As Streeter Bass recounts, "He was too old, he lacked business acumen, and – more serious in a venture of this nature – he was insecure and garrulous."

Barbeu-Dubourg wrote the article ″Chronologique″ for the Encyclopédie of Denis Diderot and Jean le Rond d'Alembert.

He died in 1779 in Paris and his ashes were buried in the chapel of Saint-Symphorien church in Saint-Germain-des-Prés.

== Carte chronographique ==
The Chronographie universelle & details qui en dependent pour la Chronologie & les Genealogies abbreviated to Carte chronographique was the first synchronoptical visualisation which attempted to map world history from the Garden of Eden to the Age of Enlightenment.

== Gallery ==
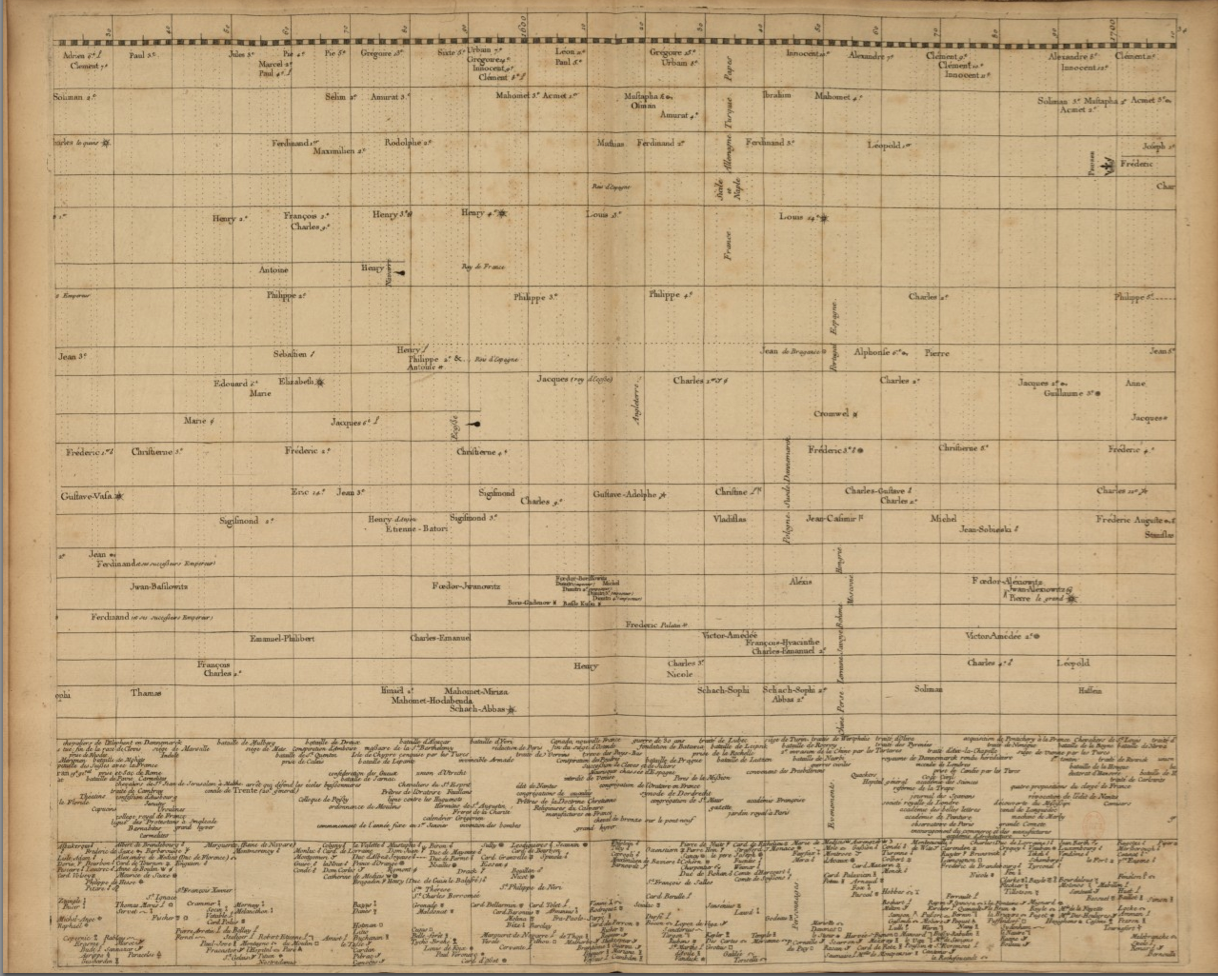
Jacques Barbeu-Dubourg, Chronographie, ou Description des Tems..., tableau 34, Paris 1753

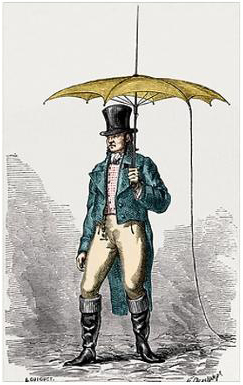
Umbrella fitted with lightning conductor, designed by Jacques Barbeu-Dubourg. 18th century engraving

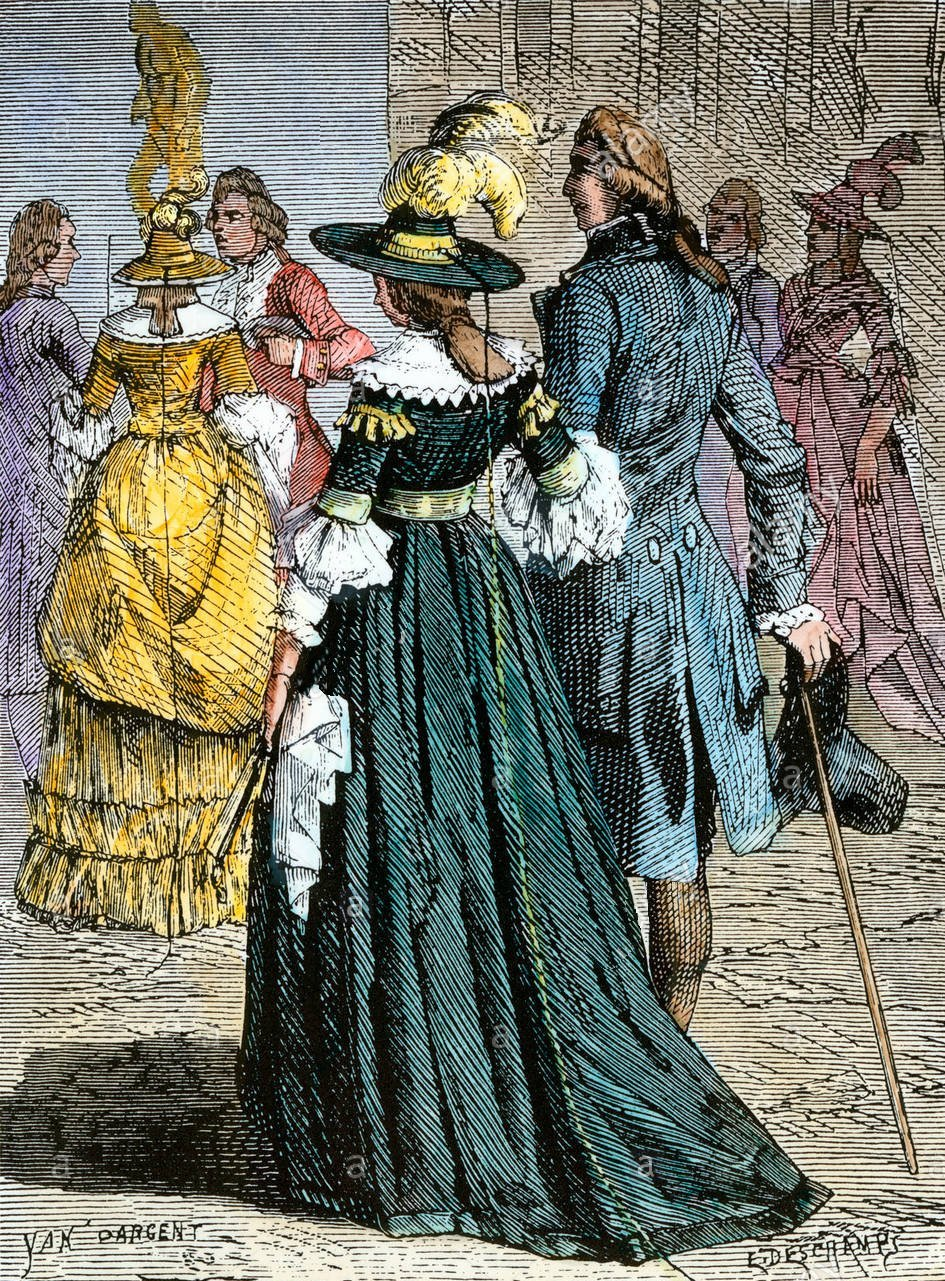
Lightning rod hats fashion of circa 1778. 19th century engraving designed by Émile Deschamps (1822–1893) and Yan Dargent (1824–1899)

== See also ==
- The Papers of Benjamin Franklin
