= A New Chart of History =

1769 infographic about the history of empires and the passing of power

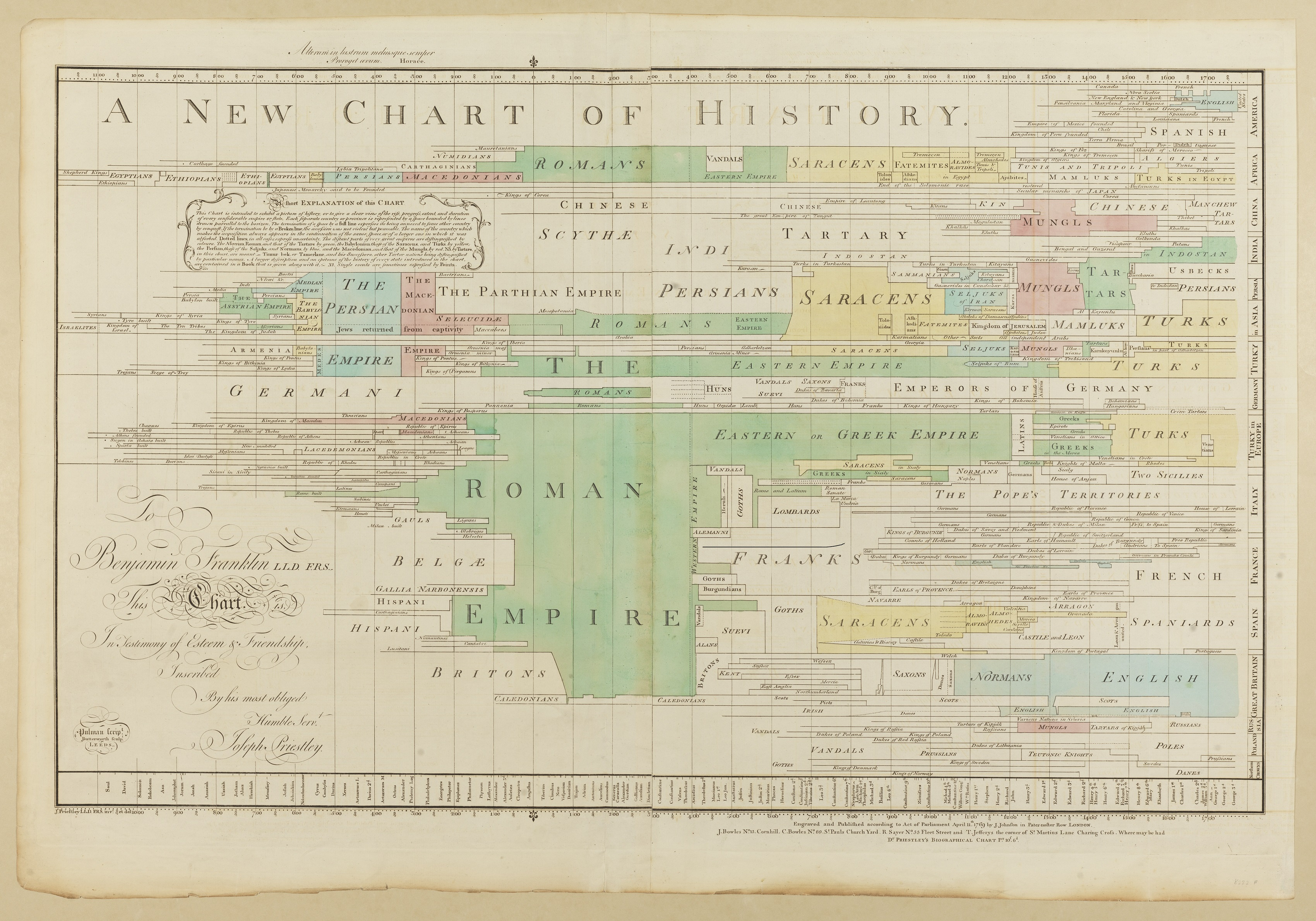
Joseph Priestley's A New Chart of History (1769)

In 1769, 18th-century British polymath Joseph Priestley published A New Chart of History and its prose explanation as a supplement to his Lectures on History and General Policy. Together with his Chart of Biography (1765), which he dedicated to his friend Benjamin Franklin, Priestley believed these charts would allow students to "trace out distinctly the dependence of events to distribute them into such periods and divisions as shall lay the whole claim of past transactions in a just and orderly manner."

The Chart of History lists events in 106 separate locations; it illustrates Priestley's belief that the entire world's history was significant, a relatively new development in the 18th century, which had begun with Voltaire and William Robertson. The world's history is divided up into the following geographical categories: Scandinavia, Poland, Russia, Great Britain, Spain, France, Italy, Turkey in Europe, Turkey in Asia, Germany, Persia, India, China, Africa and America. Priestley aimed to show the history of empires and the passing of power; the subtitle of the Description that accompanied the chart was "A View of the Principal Revolutions of Empire that have taken place in the World" and he wrote that:

The capital use [of the Charts was as] a most excellent mechanical help to the knowledge of history, impressing the imagination indelibly with a just image of the rise, progress, extent, duration, and contemporary state of all the considerable empires that have ever existed in the world.

As Arthur Sheps in his article about the Charts explains, "the horizontal line conveys an idea of the duration of fame, influence, power and domination. A vertical reading conveys an impression of the contemporaneity of ideas, events and people. The number or density of entries . . . tells us about the vitality of any age." Voids in the chart indicated intellectual Dark Ages, for example.

Both Charts were popular for decades—the A New Chart of History went through fifteen editions by 1816. The trustees of Warrington were so impressed with Priestley's lectures and charts that they arranged for the University of Edinburgh to grant him a Doctor of Law degree in 1764.
