= Hurry up and wait =

Expression, maybe from US military culture

"Hurry up and wait" is a phrase used to refer to the situation in which one is forced to hurry in order to complete a certain task, or arrive at a certain destination, by a specified time; only for nothing to happen at that time, often because other required tasks are still awaiting completion. The phrase may have originated in the United States military in the 1940s. Many U.S. military veterans, in particular, consider this phrase to be synonymous with military culture.

== See also ==
- Project management
- Parkinson's law – in other contexts, work expands to fill the time available
