= Observations on Man =

Book by David Hartley

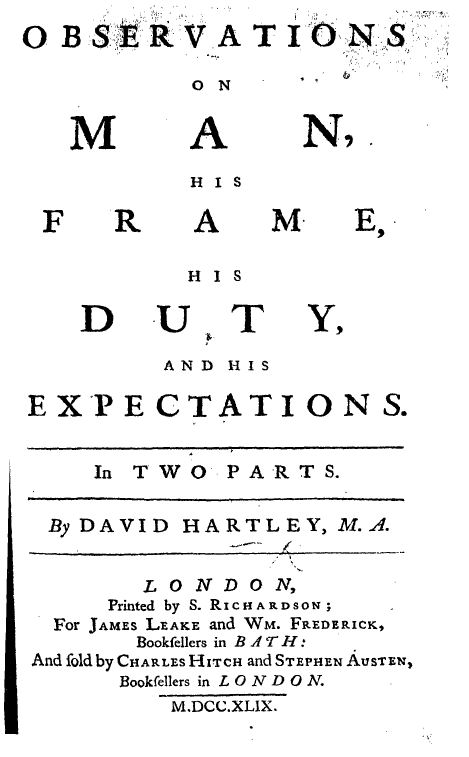
Title page from the first edition of the Observations

Observations on Man, His Frame, His Duty, and His Expectations is 18th-century British philosopher David Hartley's major work. Published in two parts in 1749 by Samuel Richardson, it puts forth Hartley's principal theories: the doctrine of vibrations and the doctrine of associations. The first part of the text deals with the frame of the human body and mind and their mutual connections and influences, the second with the duty and expectations of mankind.

== Intellectual background ==
Hartley's physical theory was drawn from certain speculations as to nervous action which Isaac Newton had published in his Principia (1687). Elements of Hartley's psychological theory were suggested by other writers, such as John Gay. For example, "in Hartley's theory, emotion is a fluid like electricity or water"—it flows from one experience to the next, a concept he called transference and lifted from the writings of Gay. Although Hartley acknowledges that Gay "put me upon considering the power of association" in relation to transference, he developed a different theory of association from Gay's.

== Hartley's theories ==
Like John Locke, Hartley asserted that, before sensation, the human mind is a tabula rasa. Beginning with simple sensations, the mind eventually forms advanced states of consciousness. Hartley sought to explain not only the phenomena of memory, which others had similarly explained before him, but also the phenomena of emotion, of reasoning, and of voluntary and involuntary action.

=== Doctrine of vibrations ===
Hartley believed that sensation is the result of vibrations of the minute particles of the medullary substance of the nerves, made possible by a subtle, elastic ether that was rare in the interstices of solid bodies and in their close neighbourhood. Pleasure was the result of moderate vibrations and pain of violent vibrations, sometimes so violent that they broke the continuity of the nerves. These vibrations left behind a tendency to fainter vibrations or "vibratiuncles" of a similar kind in the brain, which corresponded to "ideas of sensation." This accounted for memory.

=== Doctrine of association ===
According to Hartley's theory, the brain produces associations in two ways: 1) external stimuli produce vibrations; and 2) the heat and movement of its own arteries produce vibrations. The nature of these vibrations is determined by each person's past experiences and by the circumstances of the moment, which cause one or another tendency to prevail. Sensations which are frequently associated together become associated with the ideas corresponding to those sensations, sometimes so intimately that they form what appears to be a new simple idea.

=== Free will ===
Starting from a detailed account of the senses, Hartley tried to show how, by the above laws, all the emotions may be explained. He argues that pure, disinterested sentiment exists, while at the same time declaring it to have grown out of self-regarding feelings. Voluntary action is explained as the result of a firm connection between a motion and a sensation or "idea," and, on the physical side, between an "ideal" and a motory vibration. Therefore, in the free will controversy Hartley took his place as a determinist. It was only with reluctance, and when his speculations were nearly complete, that he came to a conclusion on this subject in accordance with his theory.

== Influence ==
Hartley's theory helped give birth to the modern study of the connection between the physiology of the human brain and "the mind".
