= David Hartley (philosopher) =

English philosopher (1705–1757)

David Hartley FRS
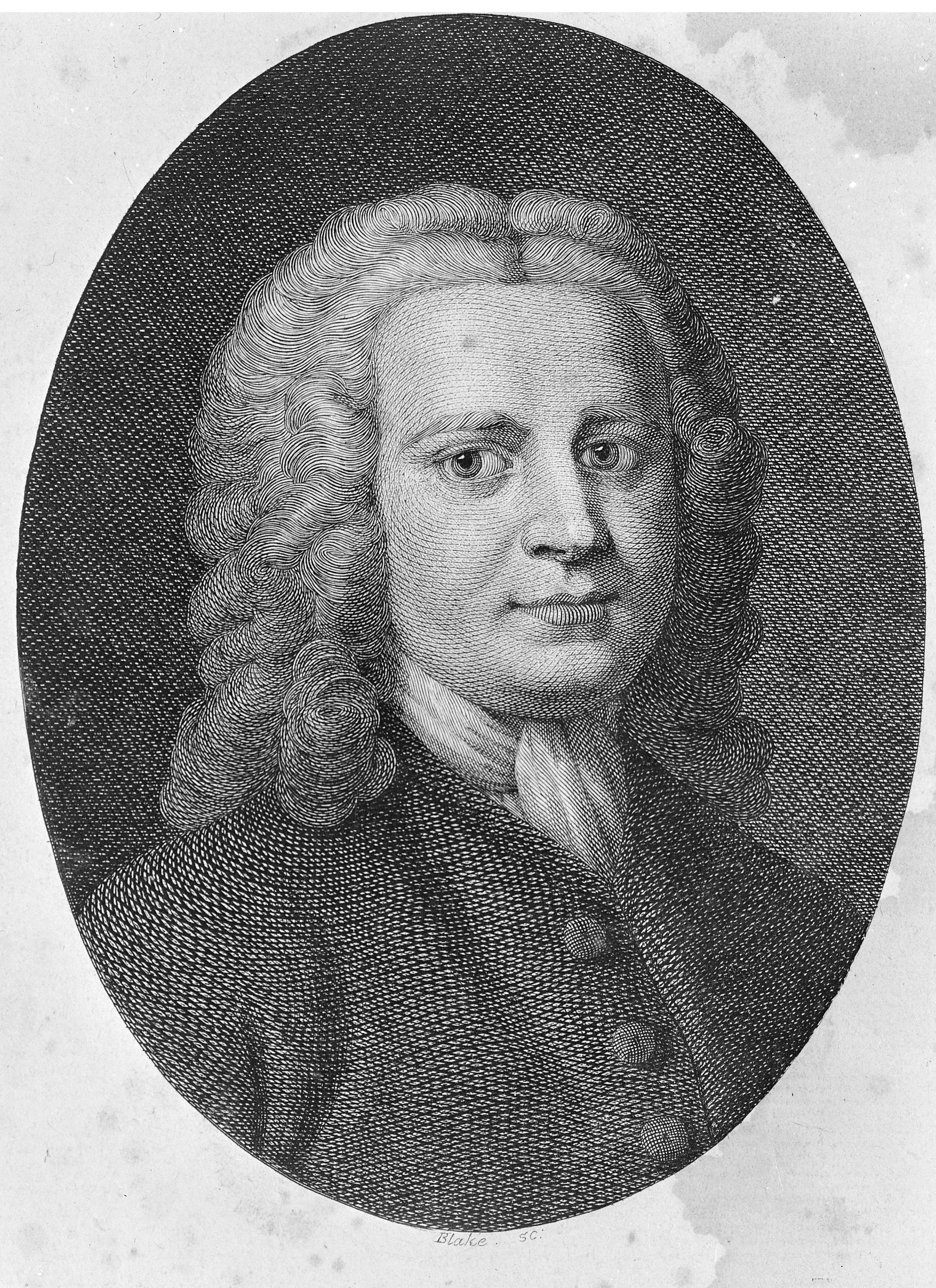
- Engraving by William Blake in the 1791 edition of Hartley's Observations on Man
- Born: 21 June O.S. 1705; Halifax, England
- Died: 28 August 1757 (aged 52); Bath, England

Education
- Education: Jesus College, Cambridge

Philosophical work
- Era: 18th-century philosophy
- Region: Western philosophy
- School: British empiricism; determinism
- Main interests: Neurology; theopathy; ethics; psychology
- Notable ideas: Associationist school of psychology; doctrine of vibrations; doctrine of associations

David Hartley (/ˈhɑːrtli/; 21 June O.S. 1705 – 28 August 1757) was an English philosopher and founder of the Associationist school of psychology. His most famous work is Observations on Man (1749).

== Early life and family history ==
David Hartley was born in 1705 in the vicinity of Halifax, Yorkshire. His mother died three months after his birth. His father, an Anglican clergyman, died when David was fifteen. Hartley was educated at Bradford Grammar School and in 1722 was admitted as a Sizar to Jesus College, Cambridge, where he was a Rustat scholar. He received his BA in 1726 and MA in 1729. In April 1730 he became the first layperson to be Master of Magnus Grammar School (Magnus Church of England Academy), Newark, and it was there that he began to practise medicine. On 21 April 1730, Hartley married Alice Rowley (1705–31). The couple moved to Bury St Edmunds, and Alice died there giving birth to their son David Hartley (the Younger) (1731–1813). While in Bury, Hartley met his second wife, Elizabeth Packer (1713–78), the fifth child and only daughter of Robert Packer (died 1731) and Mary Winchcombe, a wealthy and influential family with estates in Gloucestershire, Oxfordshire, and Berkshire, including Donnington Castle House, Shellingford Manor and Bucklebury House, Berks. (Mary Winchcombe was the daughter of Sir Henry Winchcombe, Bart., and the sister of Frances, wife of Henry St John, 1st Viscount Bolingbroke.) Despite the opposition of Elizabeth's family, David and Elizabeth wed on 25 August 1735, after agreeing to a severe set of restrictions that kept the £5,000 Elizabeth received upon her marriage completely out of the hands of her husband. Their first child, Mary (1736–1803), was born eleven months later. In 1736 the family moved to London, and then in 1742 to Bath, Somerset. When Elizabeth's last surviving elder brother died without issue in 1746, their son Winchcombe Henry (1740–94) inherited the family estates, making the family (though not Hartley himself) the possessors of significant wealth. Hartley died in Bath on 28 August 1757. He was buried at St John the Baptist Church, Old Sodbury, Gloucestershire.

== Education and professional career ==
At Cambridge, Hartley studied with Nicholas Saunderson, who, though blind since infancy, became the fourth Lucasian Professor of Mathematics. Hartley was later instrumental in raising the subscription for the posthumous publication of Saunderson's Elements of Algebra (1740). Upon graduation, Hartley declined to sign the Thirty-nine Articles, a requirement for ordination in the Church of England. Although one point at issue may have been the doctrine of the Trinity, Hartley's main dissent from Anglican orthodoxy was his assent to universal reconciliation. Writing to his friend Joseph Lister in 1736, Hartley stated he believed "[t]hat Universal Happiness is the Fundamental Doctrine both of Reason & Scripture", adding that "nothing is so irreconcilable [with] Reason as eternal Punishment, nothing so contrary to all the Intimations God has given us in his Works. Have you read Sr. Is. Newton’s Commt. upon Danl. & the Apocalypse?" For Hartley, on the gates of hell there could be no locks.

In the same letter to Lister, Hartley writes that "a Man who disregards himself, who entirely abandons Self-Interest & devotes his Labours to the Service of Mankind, or in that beautiful and expressive phrase of the Scriptures, who loves his neighbor as himself is sure to meet with private Happiness". This conviction became a guiding principle in Hartley's life, and it led him to devote himself to a various philanthropic projects. These include the publication of Saunderson's Elements of Algebra and the promotion of the shorthand system of his friend John Byrom (a system that Hartley believed could be a "universal character" and step toward the creation of a philosophical language).

Shortly after turning to medicine, Hartley became an advocate of variola inoculation for smallpox. Variolation confers personal immunity, and if widespread would be a "service to mankind" by furthering herd immunity. However, deliberate infection with the smallpox virus ran the risk of disfigurement or death. (Queen Caroline, wife of George II, was an advocate and had three of their children variolated, but Jonathan Edwards died from it in 1758.) The public good, then, could appear to be at odds with private interest. In his first publication, Some Reasons why the Practice of Inoculation ought to be Introduced into the Town of Bury at Present (1733), Hartley developed a statistical argument to show that the conflict is only apparent, that being inoculated furthers both the public good and a person's self-interest.

By the time of his move to London in 1736, Hartley was known by other campaigners of variolation, such as Hans Sloane and James Jurin, president of the Royal Society. He also had the support of important Whig families in Suffolk, notably of Charles Townshend, 2nd Viscount Townshend ('Turnip' Townshend). Hartley's daughter Mary wrote that "the old Lord Townshend (then Secretary of State) treated him with as much kindness as he had had been an additional son, and all the sons and daughters as an additional brother". He was inducted into the Royal Society, and he also became a physician to Thomas Pelham-Holles, 1st Duke of Newcastle, and his wife. In 1736 he offered to "recommend" John Byrom to George II.

By 1740, Hartley was known to every physician in London and to other medical men throughout Europe. He had thrown himself into a controversial attempt to harmonize private interest and public good. Hartley had started to experience symptoms of "the stone" (bladder stone) in early 1736. A bladder stone, sometimes as large as an egg, could function as a ball-cock on a toilet tank, causing an inability to urinate, excruciating pain, and sometimes death. (Benjamin Franklin, a sufferer, sometimes had to stand on his head to relieve himself.) Treatment by surgical removal (lithotomy) was a procedure many failed to survive.

Hartley thought a herbalist called Joanna Stephens had developed a lithontriptic, an oral medicine that would dissolve a stone in situ. He published Ten Cases of Persons who have Taken Mrs. Stephens’s Medicines for the Stone (1738), which includes an unsparing account of his own agonies. To make a proprietary medicine freely available to the public, Hartley convinced Parliament to pay Stephens £5,000 for her "secret".

With Stephens's recipe in hand, Hartley set to work with Stephen Hales, along with two colleagues in France, to locate the medicine's chemically active ingredients. These were slaked lime (calcium hydroxide) and Alicant soap (predominantly potassium oleate, like other soaps an alkaline salt of a fatty acid). Hales had shown that some bladder stones rapidly dissolved in boiled soap-lye (caustic potash, potassium hydroxide). What was needed, then, was a safely ingestible preparation that would turn a person's urine alkaline; and this, they concluded, is what the slaked lime and soap combination did. In 1739 Hales won the Copley Medal for his work, and the following year Hartley published their results in a Latin volume, De Lithontriptico, in Basel and Leiden, the latter being home at the time to the foremost medical school in Europe.

In 1742 Hartley and his family moved to Bath, Somerset. He continued to practise medicine, and he devoted himself to writing his major work, Observations on Man, His Frame, His Duty, and His Expectations, published in 1749 by Samuel Richardson.

He was a vegetarian.

== Observations on Man: "A New and Most Extensive Science" ==
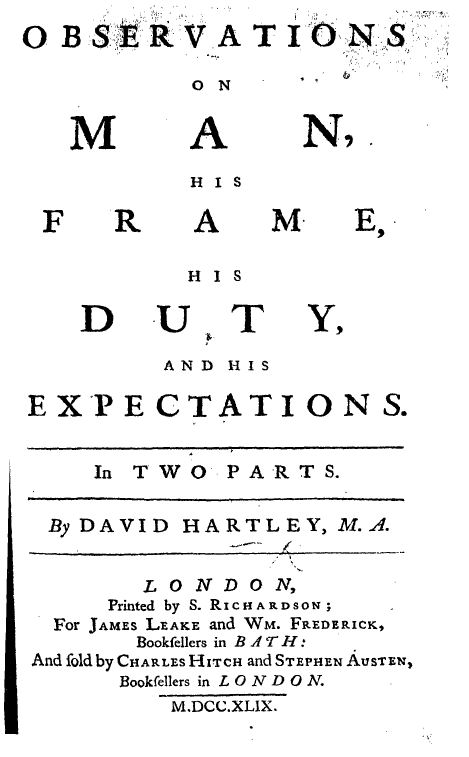
Title page from the first edition of the Observations

In the 18th century, "Observations" appears in the titles of scientific works – compare Benjamin Franklin's Experiments and Observations on Electricity (1751) and Joseph Priestley's Experiments and Observations of Different Kinds of Air (1774). Priestley, Hartley's champion, would declare that Hartley's work "contains a new and most extensive science. … [T]he study of it will be like entering upon a new world. …" The science is the science of "man", and the "new world" is the one embodied in the human "frame" itself.

The result, on the one hand, is a "vast haystack of a book". As one would expect from a physician with an inquiring mind and active medical practice, Hartley draws together a wide range of observations – to name a few, on phantom limbs, savant syndrome, and the experiences and mental development of the blind and the deaf (OM 1, props. 34, 69, 78, 80, and 93).

On the other hand, just as Newton's law of universal gravitation unified celestial and terrestrial mechanics, Hartley proposed a single "law" — "association" — to account for any and all observations of "man". Hartley's many observations are meant to be illustrations of the law.

Moreover, "association" has explanatory power. For example, in the section "The Affections by which we rejoice at the Misery of Others" (OM 1.1.4.97–98), Hartley presents a detailed analysis of the process by which an abused, bullied child becomes an abusive, bullying adult. He traces out how the child's automatic gesture of raising an arm to ward off a blow becomes, through a series of associative substitutions, the fist the adult raises to strike a child. An initial defensive gesture becomes a general aggressive stance, and thus the source of the insulting words and threatening actions by which the adult "goes on multiplying perpetually … the occasions of anger and the expressions of it".

Nonetheless, Hartley believed that it was no-one's destiny to be permanently trapped in such a hell. He was, rather, a religious visionary, and his fundamental belief breathtakingly optimistic: that association "has a tendency to reduce the state of those who have eaten of the tree of the knowledge of good and evil, back again to a paradisiacal one" (OM 1.1.2.14, Cor. 9). From this vantage point, Hartley's Observations on Man is a psychological epic, a story of "paradise regained" — but an epic describing, ultimately, the life of each human being.

== Theories ==
Like John Locke, he asserted that, prior to sensation, the human mind is a blank slate. By a growth from simple sensations, those states of consciousness which appear most remote from sensation come into being. And the one law of growth of which Hartley took account was the law of contiguity, synchronous and successive. By this law he sought to explain, not only the phenomena of memory, which others had similarly explained before him, but also the phenomena of emotion, of reasoning, and of voluntary and involuntary action (see Association of Ideas). A friend, associate, and one of his chief advocates, was Joseph Priestley (1733–1804), the discoverer of oxygen. Priestley was one of the foremost scientists of his age.

=== Doctrine of vibrations ===
Hartley's physical theory gave birth to the modern study of the intimate connection of physiological and psychical facts. He believed that sensation is the result of a vibration of the minute particles of the medullary substance of the nerves, to account for which he postulated, with Newton, a subtle elastic ether, rare in the interstices of solid bodies and in their close neighbourhood, and denser as it recedes from them. Pleasure is the result of moderate vibrations, pain of vibrations so violent as to break the continuity of the nerves. These vibrations leave behind them in the brain a tendency to fainter vibrations or "vibratiuncles" of a similar kind, which correspond to "ideas of sensation." This accounts for memory.

=== Doctrine of associations ===
The course of reminiscence and of the thoughts generally, when not immediately dependent upon external sensation, is accounted for by the idea that there are always vibrations in the brain on account of its heat and the pulsation of its arteries. The nature of these vibrations is determined by each man's past experience, and by the circumstances of the moment, which causes one or another tendency to prevail over the rest. Sensations which are often associated together become each associated with the ideas corresponding to the others; and the ideas corresponding to the associated sensations become associated together, sometimes so intimately that they form what appears to be a new simple idea, not without careful analysis resolvable into its component parts.

=== Free will ===
Starting from a detailed account of the phenomena of the senses, Hartley tried to show how, by the above laws, all the emotions, which he analyses with considerable skill, may be explained. Locke's phrase "association of ideas" is employed throughout, "idea" being taken as including every mental state but sensation. He emphatically asserts the existence of pure disinterested sentiment, while declaring it to be a growth from the self-regarding feelings. Voluntary action is explained as the result of a firm connexion between a motion and a sensation or "idea," and, on the physical side, between an "ideal" and a motory vibration. Therefore, in the free will controversy Hartley took his place as a determinist. It was only with reluctance, and when his speculations were nearly complete, that he came to a conclusion on this subject in accordance with his theory.

=== Application to animals ===
Hartley extended his theory of mental association and physiological vibration to nonhuman animals, arguing that they share the same basic mental faculties as humans, including perception, memory, and emotion. These faculties, he claimed, arise from material processes in the nervous system rather than from an immaterial soul. While humans exhibit more complex behaviour due to more refined bodily organisation, Hartley held that animals differ only in degree, not in kind. This position directly challenged the animal machine doctrine associated with René Descartes, which portrayed animals as unfeeling automata. By attributing mental continuity across species, Hartley's account anticipated later debates in animal cognition and animal consciousness, and represented an early attempt to explain animal mentality within a unified scientific framework.

== List of major works ==
- Conjecturae quaedam de sensu, motu, et idearum generatione, Appendix to De Lithontriptico a Joanna Stephens nuper invento Dissertatio Epistolaris (Bath, 1746); repr. in Samuel Parr (ed.), Metaphysical Tracts by English Philosophers (1837); trans. Robert E.A. Palmer
- Various Conjectures on the Perception, Motion, and Generation of Ideas, with an Introduction and notes by Martin Kallich (Augustan Reprint Society, Publication no. 77–8, Los Angeles, 1959).
- Observations on Man, His Frame, His Duty, and His Expectations. In Two Parts (1749; 2nd edn, trans. from the German, with A Sketch of the Life and Character of David Hartley by his son David Hartley, 1791; 1st edn repr. with an Introduction by Theodore L. Huguelet, Delmar, New York, 1976).
- Prayers and Religious Meditations (Bath, 1810; R. Cruthwell, 1814).

David Hartley also published numerous medical works.
